= Deadmau5 discography =

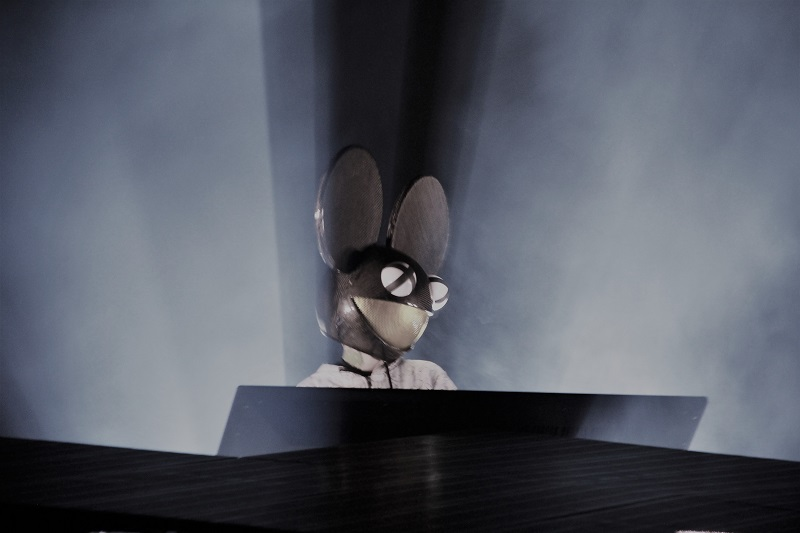
- Deadmau5 live at Red Rocks Amphitheatre in 2017
- Studio albums: 8
- Extended plays: 12
- Soundtrack albums: 1
- Compilation albums: 10
- Singles: 53
- Video albums: 2
- Music videos: 22
- Mix albums: 7

The following is a comprehensive discography of Deadmau5, Canadian electronic music producer and DJ. His discography most notably comprises eight studio albums, ten compilation albums, one soundtrack album, two video albums, seven mix albums, twelve extended plays, 53 singles, and 22 music videos.

== Albums ==
=== Studio albums ===
List of studio albums, with selected chart positions and certifications
| Title | Details | Peak chart positions | | | | | | | | | Certifications |
| Title | Details | CAN | AUS | IRE | NLD | NZ | SWI | UK | US | US Dance | Certifications |
|---|---|---|---|---|---|---|---|---|---|---|---|
| Get Scraped | Released: July 26, 2005; Label: Zoolook; Formats: CD, download | — | — | — | — | — | — | — | — | — | |
| Vexillology | Released: November 6, 2006; Label: Play Digital; Formats: CD, download, vinyl | — | — | — | — | — | — | — | — | — | |
| Random Album Title | Released: September 2, 2008; Label: Mau5trap, Ultra, Ministry of Sound; Formats: CD, download, vinyl | — | — | — | — | — | — | 31 | — | 13 | MC: Gold; BPI: Gold |
| For Lack of a Better Name | Released: September 22, 2009; Label: Mau5trap, Ultra, Virgin; Formats: CD, download, vinyl | 62 | 49 | 37 | — | — | — | 19 | — | 11 | MC: Gold; BPI: Gold |
| 4×4=12 | Release date: December 6, 2010; Label: Mau5trap, Ultra, Virgin; Formats: CD, download, vinyl | 7 | 53 | 34 | 82 | — | 56 | 48 | 47 | 2 | MC: Platinum; BPI: Gold; RIAA: Platinum |
| Album Title Goes Here | Released: September 25, 2012; Label: Mau5trap, Ultra, Virgin, Parlophone; Formats: CD, download | 2 | 11 | 6 | 16 | 17 | 18 | 9 | 6 | 1 | MC: Gold |
| While(1<2) | Released: June 17, 2014; Label: Mau5trap, Astralwerks, Virgin; Formats: CD, download, vinyl | 5 | 9 | 25 | 36 | 25 | 25 | 14 | 9 | 1 | |
| W:/2016Album/ | Released: December 2, 2016; Label: Mau5trap; Formats: CD, download, vinyl | 37 | 58 | — | — | — (Note: W:/2016Album/ did not enter the NZ Top 40 Albums Chart, but peaked at number four on the NZ Heatseekers Albums Chart.) | 84 | — | 74 | 1 | |
| Kx5 (with Kaskade) | Released: March 17, 2023; Label: Mau5trap, Arkade; Formats: vinyl, download | — | — | — | — | — | — | — | — | 6 | |
"—" denotes a recording that did not chart or was not released in that territory.

=== Compilation albums ===
List of compilation albums, with peak chart positions
| Title | Details | Peak chart positions | | | | | | | | |
| Title | Details | CAN | AUS | IRE | BEL | SWI | UK | US | US Dance | US Class |
|---|---|---|---|---|---|---|---|---|---|---|
| Deadmau5 Circa 1998–2002 (as Halcyon441) | Released: April 5, 2006; Label: None (self-released); Formats: Download | — | — | — | — | — | — | — | — | — |
| A Little Oblique | Released: April 5, 2006; Label: None (self-released); Formats: Download | — | — | — | — | — | — | — | — | — |
| Project 56 | Released: February 19, 2008; Label: None (self-released); Formats: Download | — | — | — | — | — | — | — | — | — |
| It Sounds Like | Released: March 16, 2009; Label: Cinnamon Flava; Formats: Download | — | — | — | — | — | — | — | — | — |
| For Lack of a Better Album Title | Release date: December 13, 2010; Label: EMI, Mau5trap; Formats: Download | — | — | — | — | — | — | — | — | — |
| The Remixes | Released: October 28, 2011; Label: Cubrik; Formats: CD, download | — | — | — | — | — | — | — | — | — |
| 5 Years of Mau5 | Released: November 24, 2014; Label: Mau5trap, Ultra (US & Canada), Virgin (worldwide); Formats: CD, download | 23 | 77 | 87 | 97 | 95 | 11 | 105 | 2 | — |
| Stuff I Used to Do | Released: March 3, 2017; Label: Mau5trap; Formats: Download | — | — | — | — | — | — | — | 20 | — |
| Where's the Drop? | Released: March 30, 2018; Label: Mau5trap; Formats: Download, vinyl | — | — | — | — | — | — | — | — | 9 |
| Here's the Drop! | Released: October 4, 2019; Label: Mau5trap; Formats: Download, vinyl | — | — | — | — | — | — | — | — | — |
"—" denotes a recording that did not chart or was not released in that territory.

=== Soundtrack albums ===
| Title | Details |
|---|---|
| Polar (Music from the Netflix Film) | Released: January 25, 2019; Label: Mau5trap; Format: Download |

=== Mix albums ===
List of mix albums, with peak chart positions
| Title | Details | Peak chart positions | |
| Title | Details | US | US Cat |
|---|---|---|---|
| Tech-Trance-Electro Madness Glenn Morrison | Released: January 16, 2008; Label: Play Records; Formats: CD | — | — |
| At Play | Released: October 20, 2008; Label: Play Records, Play Digital; Formats: CD, download | 163 | 36 |
| At Play Vol. 2 | Released: November 17, 2009; Label: Play Records; Formats: CD, download, vinyl | — | — |
| At Play Vol. 3 | Released: June 14, 2010; Label: Play Records; Formats: CD, download, vinyl | — | — |
| At Play Vol. 4 | Release date: November 5, 2012; Label: Play Records; Formats: CD, download | — | — |
| At Play in the USA, Vol. 1 | Released: April 29, 2013; Label: Play Records; Formats: CD, download | — | — |
| At Play Vol. 5 | Released: December 15, 2014; Label: Play Records; Formats: CD, download | — | — |
| Live at Electric Forest 2018 (as Testpilot) | Released: March 8, 2019; Label: Dubset; Format: Download | ― | ― |
| Testpilot at EDC Las Vegas 2021: Neon Garden Stage (DJ Mix) (as Testpilot) | Released: October 22, 2021; Label: n/a; Format: Download | ― | ― |
"—" denotes a recording that did not chart or was not released in that territory.

=== Video albums ===
| Title | Details | Certifications |
|---|---|---|
| Live @ Earl's Court | Released: August 2, 2011; Label: Mau5trap, Ultra; Formats: Download, DVD | MC: Gold |
| Meowingtons Hax 2k11 Toronto | Released: February 7, 2012; Label: Mau5trap, Ultra; Formats: Download, DVD | |

== Extended plays ==
List of extended plays
| Title | EP details | Peak chart positions | | |
| Title | EP details | CAN | US Dance | US Ind |
|---|---|---|---|---|
| Full Circle | Released: January 5, 2007; Label: Play Records; Formats: Download, CD | — | — | — |
| Cocktail Queen (with Melleefresh) | Released: February 23, 2007; Label: Play Records; Formats: Download | — | — | — |
| Everything Is Complicated | Released: November 25, 2007; Label: Mau5trap, Cinnamon Flava; Formats: Download, vinyl | — | — | — |
| The Veldt | Released: June 22, 2012; Label: Mau5trap, Ultra Records, Virgin EMI; Format: Download | — | — | — |
| 7 | Released: November 12, 2013; Label: None (self-released); Format: Download | — | — | — |
| Sunspot (White Space Conflict) (as Testpilot) | Released: March 3, 2014; Label: Plus 8 Records; Format: Download | — | — | — |
| Mau5ville: Level 1 | Released: July 13, 2018; Label: Mau5trap; Format: Download | 78 | 8 | 22 |
| Mau5ville: Level 2 | Released: November 16, 2018; Label: Mau5trap; Format: Download | — | 21 | — |
| Mau5ville: Level 3 | Released: February 1, 2019; Label: Mau5trap; Format: Download | — | — | — |
| Some EP | Released: July 19, 2024; Label: Mau5trap; Format: Download | — | — | — |
| Jaded | Released: November 8, 2024; Label: Mau5trap; Format: Download | — | — | — |
| Error5 | Released: August 5, 2025; Label: Mau5trap; Format: Download | — | — | — |

== Singles ==
List of singles as lead artist, with selected chart positions and certifications, showing year released and album name
| Title | Year | Peak chart positions | | | | | | | | | | Certifications | Album |
| Title | Year | CAN | CAN Dig | AUS | EU | NLD | UK | US | US Dance | US Dig | US Heat | Certifications | Album |
|---|---|---|---|---|---|---|---|---|---|---|---|---|---|
| "Faxing Berlin" | 2006 | — | — | — | — | — | — | — | 6 | — | — | | Random Album Title |
| "Not Exactly" | 2007 | — | — | — | — | — | — | — | — | 46 | — | | Random Album Title |
| "Arguru" | 2007 | — | — | — | — | — | — | — | — | — | — | | Random Album Title |
| "I Thought Inside Out" (with Chris Lake) | 2007 | — | — | — | — | — | — | — | — | — | — | | Non-album singles |
| "The Reward Is Cheese" | 2007 | — | 42 | — | — | — | — | — | — | — | — | | Non-album singles |
| "Alone with You" | 2008 | — | — | — | — | — | — | — | — | — | — | | Random Album Title |
| "Fifths" | 2008 | — | — | — | — | — | — | — | — | — | — | | Non-album single |
| "Move for Me" (with Kaskade) | 2008 | 66 | — | — | — | — | — | — | 1 | — | — | MC: Gold | Strobelite Seduction |
| "Hi Friend!" (featuring MC Flipside) | 2008 | — | — | — | — | — | — | — | — | — | — | | For Lack of a Better Name |
| "Bye Friend" | 2008 | — | — | — | — | — | — | — | — | — | — | | Non-album singles |
| "Clockwork" | 2008 | — | — | — | — | — | — | — | — | — | — | | Non-album singles |
| "I Remember" (with Kaskade) | 2008 | — | — | — | 46 | 23 | 14 | — | 1 | 29 | — | MC: Gold; BPI: Platinum | Random Album Title and Strobelite Seduction |
| "Ghosts 'n' Stuff" (Instrumental or featuring Rob Swire) | 2008 | 53 | 56 | — | 41 | — | 12 | — | 1 | 6 | 24 | MC: 3× Platinum; BPI: Gold; RIAA: Gold; RIAA: 2× Platinum (instrumental) | For Lack of a Better Name |
| "Slip" | 2008 | — | — | — | — | — | — | — | — | — | — | | Random Album Title |
| "Brazil (2nd Edit)" | 2009 | — | — | — | — | 73 | — | — | — | — | — | | Random Album Title |
| "Word Problems" | 2009 | — | — | — | — | — | — | — | — | — | — | | For Lack of a Better Name |
| "Bot" | 2009 | — | — | — | — | — | — | — | — | — | — | | For Lack of a Better Name |
| "Lack of a Better Name" | 2009 | — | — | — | — | — | — | — | — | — | — | | For Lack of a Better Name |
| "Strobe" | 2010 | — | — | — | — | — | 122 | — | — | 29 | — | | For Lack of a Better Name |
| "I Said" (with Chris Lake) | 2010 | — | — | — | — | — | — | — | — | — | — | | Non-album single^{[note]} |
| "Some Chords" | 2010 | — | — | — | — | — | 120 | — | 50 | 13 | — | | 4×4=12 |
| "Animal Rights" (with Wolfgang Gartner) | 2010 | 72 | — | — | — | — | 70 | — | — | 34 | — | | 4×4=12 |
| "Sofi Needs a Ladder" (featuring SOFI) | 2010 | 73 | 49 | — | — | — | 68 | — | 12 | 14 | — | MC: Platinum | 4×4=12 |
| "Right This Second" | 2010 | 79 | 43 | — | — | — | 100 | — | — | 9 | — | | 4×4=12 |
| "Bad Selection" | 2010 | — | — | — | — | — | 137 | — | — | 16 | — | | 4×4=12 |
| "HR 8938 Cephei" | 2011 | — | — | — | — | — | — | — | — | — | — | | Non-album single |
| "Raise Your Weapon" (featuring Greta Svabo Bech) | 2011 | 93 | — | — | — | — | 117 | 100 | — | 15 | 11 | MC: Platinum | 4×4=12 |
| "Where My Keys" | 2011 | — | — | — | — | — | — | — | — | — | — | | Meowingtons Hax Tour Trax |
| "Aural Psynapse" | 2011 | 38 | 16 | — | — | — | 150 | ― | — | 7 | 16 | MC: Gold | 5 Years of Mau5 |
| "Maths" | 2012 | — | — | — | — | — | 197 | — | — | 20 | — | | Album Title Goes Here |
| "The Veldt" (featuring Chris James) | 2012 | 24 | 14 | — | 124 | 63 | 68 | — | 5 | 11 | — | MC: Platinum | Album Title Goes Here |
| "Professional Griefers" (featuring Gerard Way) | 2012 | 66 | 51 | — | — | — | 81 | — | 30 | 13 | — | | Album Title Goes Here |
| "Channel 42" (with Wolfgang Gartner) | 2013 | — | — | — | — | — | — | — | 37 | 12 | — | | Album Title Goes Here |
| "Telemiscommunications" (with Imogen Heap) | 2013 | — | — | — | — | — | — | — | — | — | — | | Album Title Goes Here and Sparks |
| "Suckfest9001" | 2013 | — | — | — | — | — | — | — | 47 | — | — | | We Are Friends, Vol. 2 |
| "Avaritia" | 2014 | 92 | 53 | — | — | — | 121 | — | 22 | 11 | — | | While(1<2) |
| "Seeya" (featuring Colleen D'Agostino) | 2014 | 20 | 22 | 85 | — | — | — | — | 25 | 13 | — | MC: Platinum | While(1<2) |
| "Infra Turbo Pigcart Racer" | 2014 | — | 60 | — | — | — | — | — | 20 | 10 | — | | While(1<2) |
| "Phantoms Can't Hang" | 2014 | 78 | 39 | 97 | — | — | — | — | 16 | 7 | — | | While(1<2) |
| "Snowcone" | 2016 | — | — | — | — | — | — | — | — | 40 | — | | W:/2016Album/ |
| "Beneath with Me" (with Kaskade featuring Skylar Grey) | 2016 | — | — | — | — | — | — | — | — | — | — | | Non-album single |
| "Saved" | 2016 | — | — | — | — | — | — | — | — | — | — | | We Are Friends, Vol. 5 |
| "Let Go" (featuring Grabbitz) | 2016 | — | — | — | — | — | — | — | 11 | — | — | | W:/2016Album/ |
| "Legendary" (with Shotty Horroh) | 2017 | — | — | — | — | — | — | — | — | — | — | | Non-album single |
| "Drama Free" (featuring Lights) | 2018 | — | — | — | — | — | — | — | 46 | — | — | | Mau5ville: Level 2 |
| "Midas Heel" | 2019 | — | — | — | — | — | — | — | — | — | — | | Polar (Music from the Netflix Film) |
| "Satrn" | 2019 | — | — | — | — | — | — | — | 40 | 9 | — | | Non-album singles |
| "Coasted" | 2019 | — | — | — | — | — | — | — | — | 13 | — | | Non-album singles |
| "Fall" | 2019 | — | — | — | — | — | — | — | 37 | 8 | — | | Non-album singles |
| "Pomegranate" (with the Neptunes) | 2020 | — | — | — | — | — | — | — | 15 | 10 | — | | Non-album singles |
| "Bridged by a Lightwave" (with Kiesza) | 2020 | — | — | — | — | — | — | — | 20 | 11 | — | | Non-album singles |
| "Channel 43" (with Wolfgang Gartner) | 2021 | — | — | — | — | — | — | — | 20 | 11 | — | | Non-album singles |
| "Nextra" | 2021 | — | — | — | — | — | — | — | 45 | — | — | | Non-album singles |
| "Hypnocurrency" (with Rezz) | 2021 | — | — | — | — | — | — | — | 14 | 10 | — | | Non-album singles |
| "When the Summer Dies" (with Lights) | 2021 | — | — | — | — | — | — | — | 24 | 23 | — | | Non-album singles |
| "Hyperlandia" (featuring Foster the People) | 2021 | — | — | — | — | — | — | — | 24 | — | — | | Non-album singles |
| "Escape" (as Kx5 with Kaskade featuring Hayla) | 2022 | 52 | — | — | — | — | — | — | 11 | 4 | — | | Kx5 |
| "XYZ" | 2022 | — | — | — | — | — | — | — | 44 | — | — | | Non-album single |
| "Take Me High" (as Kx5 with Kaskade) | 2022 | — | — | — | — | — | — | — | 38 | — | — | | Kx5 |
| "Alive" (as Kx5 with Kaskade featuring the Moth and the Flame) | 2022 | — | — | — | — | — | — | — | — | — | — | | Kx5 |
| "Avalanche" (as Kx5 with Kaskade featuring James French) | 2022 | — | — | — | — | — | — | — | — | — | — | | Kx5 |
| "Quezacotl" | 2024 | — | — | — | — | — | — | — | 50 | — | — | | Some EP |
| "Familiars" | 2024 | — | — | — | — | — | — | — | — | — | — | | Non-album singles |
| "Jupiter" | 2025 | — | — | — | — | — | — | — | — | — | — | | Non-album singles |
| "Sixes" | 2025 | — | — | — | — | — | — | — | — | — | — | | Non-album singles |
| "Ameonna" | 2025 | — | — | — | — | — | — | — | — | — | — | | Non-album singles |
| "Science" (with Stevie Appleton) | 2026 | — | — | — | — | — | — | — | — | — | — | | Non-album singles |
| "—" denotes a recording that did not chart or was not released in that territory. | | | | | | | | | | | | | Non-album singles |

The original mix of "I Said" was not released on an album. However, the Michael Woods remix was included on 4×4=12.

== Other charted songs ==
List of songs, with selected chart positions, showing year released and album name
| Title | Year | Peak chart positions | | | | | Album |
| Title | Year | CAN | CAN Dig | US Mix | US Dance | US Dig | Album |
|---|---|---|---|---|---|---|---|
| "Attention Whore" (with Melleefresh) | 2009 | — | — | — | 10 | — | At Play Vol. 2 |
| "Sex Slave" (with Melleefresh) | 2010 | — | — | — | 15 | — | At Play Vol. 2 |
| "A City in Florida" | 2010 | 83 | 52 | — | — | 7 | 4×4=12 |
| "Superliminal" | 2012 | 91 | 55 | — | — | 27 | Album Title Goes Here |
| "There Might Be Coffee" | 2012 | — | — | — | — | 28 | Album Title Goes Here |
| "4ware" | 2016 | — | — | — | 45 | 22 | W:/2016Album/ |
| "Monophobia" (featuring Rob Swire) | 2018 | — | 37 | 3 | 19 | 9 | Mau5ville: Level 1 |
"—" denotes a recording that did not chart or was not released in that territory.

== Guest appearances ==
| Title | Year | Album |
|---|---|---|
| "Mau5cave" (C418 and Deadmau5) | 2011 | Seven Years of Server Data |
| "Raise Your Weapon" (live at the 54th Annual Grammy Awards) | 2012 | Non-album single |
| "Stay" (Colleen D'Agostino featuring Deadmau5) | 2015 | Collide |
| "Bad at Titles" (Attlas and Deadmau5) | 2017 | We Are Friends, Vol. 6 |
| "The Horn of Jericho" (Dronehands featuring Deadmau5) | 2019 | October Forever |

== Remixes ==
List of remixes, showing year released, original artist(s) and album
| Title | Year | Original artist(s) | Album |
|---|---|---|---|
| "I'm Electric" (as Karma K) | 2002 | Revenge of the Egg People | The Gummie Bear Murders |
| "Obsidian" (as Halcyon441) | 2006 | Rubik | Deadmau5 Circa 1998–2002 |
| "This Is Also the Hook" | 2006 | BSOD | This Is The Hook |
| "Beautiful, Rich & Horny" | 2006 | Melleefresh & Dirty 30 | A Little Oblique / The Remixes |
| "Community Funk" | 2007 | Burufunk & Carbon Community | Community Funk / The Remixes |
| "Merrymaking at My Place" | 2007 | Calvin Harris | Merrymaking at My Place |
| "Teaser (Version 1)" | 2007 | Cirez D | Teaser (Remixes) |
| "Cherry Twist" | 2007 | The Crystal Method | Vegas (Deluxe Edition) |
| "Harder, Better, Faster, Stronger" | 2007 | Daft Punk | Non-album single |
| "It's Our Future" | 2007 | Francesco Diaz & Young Rebels | It's Our Future / The Remixes |
| "Remote" | 2007 | James Talk | Remote |
| "I Don't Care" | 2007 | Jorgensen vs. BSD | I Don't Care |
| "Finished Symphony" | 2007 | Hybrid | Re_Mixed / The Remixes |
| "Dark Beat" | 2007 | Kamisshake | Dark Beat / The Remixes |
| "What U Feel" | 2007 | Matt Rock | What U Feel |
| "Whispers" | 2007 | Melleefresh & Deadmau5 | Cocktail Queen |
| "Super Skunk" | 2007 | Noir | Super Skunk / The Remixes |
| "NuFunk" | 2007 | NuBreed | NuFunk and Subtronic / The Remixes |
| "No Pressure" | 2007 | One + One | AM:PM |
| "Burn" | 2007 | Prime 33 | Burn / The Remixes |
| "The Rising" | 2007 | Purple Code | The Rising / The Remixes |
| "Slide" | 2007 | Tom Neville | Slide & Soar EP |
| "Synthetic Symphony" | 2008 | Blendbrank | Synthetic Symphony |
| "What Planet You On" (featuring Luciana) | 2008 | Bodyrox | What Planet You On / The Remixes |
| "I Want You (Forever)" | 2008 | Carl Cox & Yousef | The Remixes |
| "Breathless" | 2008 | Clearcut | Breathless |
| "Café Del Mar" | 2008 | Energy 52 | Café Del Mar (2008 Remixes) / The Remixes |
| "Not Alone" (featuring Molly) | 2008 | Gianluca Motta | Not Alone |
| "Look at U" | 2008 | Julien-K | Look at U |
| "Tiny Dancer" (featuring Casey Barnes) | 2008 | Marco DeMark | Tiny Dancer / The Remixes |
| "Space & Time" | 2008 | Mike Di Scala | Space & Time / The Remixes |
| "The Longest Road" | 2008 | Morgan Page | The Longest Road |
| "To Forever" | 2008 | Rachael Starr | To Forever / The Remixes |
| "Don't You Wanna Feel" | 2008 | Rogue Traders | What You're On |
| "Bad Clock" | 2008 | Sébastien Léger | Majestic |
| "Give It Up for Me" | 2008 | Sydney Blu | Give It Up for Me |
| "All U Ever Want" | 2009 | Billy Newton-Davis | All U Ever Want |
| "I'm Not Alone" | 2009 | Calvin Harris | I'm Not Alone |
| "The Sky Was Pink" | 2009 | Nathan Fake | Non-album single |
| "You & I" | 2009 | Medina | You & I |
| "Killing in the Name" | 2009 | Rage Against the Machine | Non-album single |
| "Watercolour" | 2010 | Pendulum | Watercolour |
| "Pjanoo" | 2010 | Eric Prydz | Non-album single |
| "Rope" | 2011 | Foo Fighters | Rope |
| "Ice Age" | 2012 | How to Destroy Angels | while(1<2) |
| "Survivalism" | 2012 | Nine Inch Nails | while(1<2) |
| "Weird Science" | 2013 | Oingo Boingo | Non-album single |

== Productions ==
List of productions, showing year released, original artist(s) and album
| Title | Year | Artist(s) | Album |
|---|---|---|---|
| "This Is the Hook" | 2006 | BSOD | At Play |
| "Contact" | 2007 | Glenn Morrison | Contact / Hydrology |
| "Hydrology" | 2007 | Glenn Morrison | Contact / Hydrology |
| "Give it Up for Me" | 2008 | Sydney Blu | Non-album single |
| "Redic" | 2008 | WTF? | Redic / CEABA55555 |
| "CEABA55555" | 2008 | WTF? | Redic / CEABA55555 |
| "Milton" | 2008 | BSOD | Non-album single |
| "One Sided" | 2009 | Mickey Slim | Non-album single |
| "Happiness" | 2010 | Alexis Jordan | Alexis Jordan |

== Music videos ==
=== As lead artist ===
List of music videos as lead artist, showing year released, directors and album
| Title | Year | Director(s) | Album |
|---|---|---|---|
| "Monday" | 2006 | none | Project 56 |
| "My Opinion" | 2006 | none | Deadmau5 Circa 1998–2002 |
| "Move for Me" (with Kaskade) | 2008 | none | Strobelite Seduction |
| "I Remember" (with Kaskade) | 2008 | Colin O'Toole | Random Album Title |
| "Ghosts 'n' Stuff" (featuring Rob Swire) | 2008 | Colin O'Toole | For Lack of a Better Name |
| "Afterhours" (vs. Melleefresh) | 2010 | Clive Smith | At Play |
| "Attention Whore" (vs. Melleefresh) | 2010 | Clive Smith | At Play Vol. 2 |
| "This Noise" | 2010 | Aaron A | At Play Vol. 2 |
| "Some Chords" | 2010 | Chris Lee | 4×4=12 |
| "Sofi Needs a Ladder" (featuring SOFI) | 2010 | none | 4×4=12 |
| "Lai" | 2011 | Jamie Carswell | At Play Vol. 3 |
| "The Veldt" (featuring Chris James) | 2012 | Manroop Takhar | > album title goes here < |
| "Professional Griefers" (featuring Gerard Way) | 2012 | Paul Boyd | > album title goes here < |
| "Channel 42" (with Wolfgang Gartner) | 2013 | none | > album title goes here < |
| "Telemiscommunications" (with Imogen Heap) | 2013 | Imogen Heap and Colin Gordon | > album title goes here < |
| "Beneath with Me" (with Kaskade featuring Skylar Grey) | 2016 | Daniel Carberry | none |
| "Let Go" (Cube 2.1) (featuring Grabbitz) | 2016 | none | W:/2016ALBUM/ |
| "Legendary" (with Shotty Horroh) | 2017 | none | none |
| "Monophobia" (featuring Rob Swire) | 2018 | Nick DenBoer and Kenny Hotz | mau5ville: Level 1 |
| "Drama Free" (featuring Lights) | 2018 | Nick DenBoer | mau5ville: Level 2 |
| "10.8" (with Mr. Bill) | 2019 | none | mau5ville: Level 2 |
| "Pomegranate" (with The Neptunes) | 2020 | Nick DenBoer | none |

== Video games ==
- Dota 2 Dieback Music Pack (2015)
