= 5 Years of Mau5 =

Compilation album by Deadmau5
- Released: November 24, 2014
- Recorded: 2007–2012 (disc 1); 2009–2014 (disc 2)
- Genre: Progressive house; electro house; tech house; deep house; electronica; dubstep
- Length: 134:05
- Label: Mau5trap; Ultra (US and Canada); Virgin (worldwide)
- Producer: Joel Zimmerman

Deadmau5 chronology
While(1<2) (2014)	5 Years of Mau5 (2014)	W:/2016Album/ (2016)

Singles from 5 Years of Mau5
- 1. "Aural Psynapse" Released: November 4, 2011

Professional ratings
Review scores
Source	Rating
AllMusic	4/5 stars

5 Years of Mau5 is a greatest hits and remix album by Canadian electronic music producer Deadmau5. It was released on November 24, 2014, in celebration of the five-year anniversary of his label, Mau5trap. Like his previous studio album, While(1<2) the retrospective was released in double disc format. The first disc acts as a greatest hits album encompassing highlights from the past five years of his back catalog, while the second disc serves as a remix album featuring exclusive and new remixes from various artists. The album artwork features a combination of the 'Mau5heads' used in the cover art of his first four studio albums released through the label: Random Album Title, For Lack of a Better Name, 4×4=12 and Album Title Goes Here.

== Track listing ==
Disc 1
No.	Title	Writer(s)	Originally from	Length
1.	"Ghosts 'n' Stuff" (featuring Rob Swire)	Joel Zimmerman, Rob Swire	For Lack of a Better Name (2009)	5:28
2.	"Raise Your Weapon" (vocals by Greta Svabo Bech)	Joel Zimmerman, Cydney Sheffield, Sonny Moore	4×4=12 (2010)	8:22
3.	"I Remember" (vocal mix; with Kaskade; vocals by Haley Gibby)	Joel Zimmerman, Ryan Raddon, Finn Bjarnson	Random Album Title (2008)	9:53
4.	"Some Chords"	Joel Zimmerman	4×4=12 (2010)	7:27
5.	"Strobe" (Club Edit)	Joel Zimmerman	For Lack of a Better Name (2009)	6:19
6.	"The Veldt" (8 Minute Edit; featuring Chris James)	Joel Zimmerman, Chris James	Album Title Goes Here (2012)	8:39
7.	"Brazil (2nd Edit)"	Joel Zimmerman	Random Album Title (2008)	6:37
8.	"Aural Psynapse"	Joel Zimmerman	Non-album single (2011)	7:30
9.	"Not Exactly"	Joel Zimmerman	Random Album Title (2008)	9:15
10.	"Sofi Needs a Ladder" (vocals by SOFI)	Joel Zimmerman, Sofia Toufa	4×4=12 (2010)	6:41
Total length:				76:22

Disc 2
No.	Title	Writer(s)	Length
1.	"Some Chords" (Dillon Francis Remix)	Joel Zimmerman	4:52
2.	"Ghosts 'n' Stuff" (Chuckie Remix; featuring Rob Swire)	Joel Zimmerman, Rob Swire	6:03
3.	"The Veldt" (deadmau5 vs Eric Prydz Edit; featuring Chris James)	Joel Zimmerman, Chris James	6:27
4.	"Maths" (Botnek Remix)	Joel Zimmerman	4:23
5.	"Raise Your Weapon" (Madeon Extended Remix)	Joel Zimmerman, Cydney Sheffield, Sonny Moore	4:15
6.	"Strobe" (Michael Woods 2014 Remix)	Joel Zimmerman	7:11
7.	"I Remember" (Shiba San Remix; with Kaskade)	Joel Zimmerman, Ryan Raddon, Finn Bjarnson	5:35
8.	"Raise Your Weapon" (Wax Motif Remix)	Joel Zimmerman, Cydney Sheffield, Sonny Moore	4:33
9.	"Sofi Needs a Ladder" (Pig&Dan Remix)	Joel Zimmerman, Sofia Toufa	7:40
10.	"Ghosts 'n' Stuff" (Nero Remix; featuring Rob Swire)	Joel Zimmerman, Rob Swire	6:55
Total length:			57:55

Beatport exclusive bonus tracks
No.	Title	Writer(s)	Length
11.	"I Said" (Michael Woods 'I Said It Again' ReEdit; with Chris Lake)	Joel Zimmerman, Chris Lake	6:16
12.	"Raise Your Weapon" (Weiss Remix)	Joel Zimmerman, Cydney Sheffield, Sonny Moore	5:52

iTunes exclusive bonus tracks
No.	Title	Writer(s)	Length
11.	"Maths" (Cobra Effect Remix)	Joel Zimmerman	4:43
12.	"Raise Your Weapon" (Maywald Remix)	Joel Zimmerman, Cydney Sheffield, Sonny Moore	7:05
Total length:			69:42

Spotify exclusive bonus track
No.	Title	Writer(s)	Length
11.	"Raise Your Weapon" (Michael Cassette Remix)	Joel Zimmerman, Cydney Sheffield, Sonny Moore	6:02

Notes

- "Maths" originally from Album Title Goes Here (2012)
- "I Said" originally from 4×4=12 (2010)
- Nero's remix of "Ghosts 'n' Stuff" and Madeon's remix of "Raise Your Weapon" were originally released in 2009 and 2011, respectively.
- The deadmau5 vs Eric Prydz edit for "The Veldt" and the Michael Cassette remix for "Raise Your Weapon" were both initially recorded around 2012 and originally released around 2013, but neither were officially released before the album.
- The original track listing was meant to feature the Wolfgang Gartner collaboration "Animal Rights" instead of "Not Exactly",
  as well as a remix of "Word Problems" by Friend Within (which was not finished in time for the album's release) in place of Wax Motif's Remix of "Raise Your Weapon".

== Charts ==
=== Weekly charts ===
Weekly chart performance for 5 Years of Mau5
Chart (2014–2015)	Peak position
Australian Albums (ARIA)	77
Belgian Albums (Ultratop Flanders)	97
Belgian Albums (Ultratop Wallonia)	130
Canadian Albums (Billboard)	23
Irish Albums (IRMA)	87
Swiss Albums (Schweizer Hitparade)	95
UK Dance Albums (OCC)	11
US Billboard 200	105
US Top Dance/Electronic Albums (Billboard)	2
US Digital Albums (Billboard)	24
US Independent Albums (Billboard)	8

=== Year-end charts ===
Year-end chart performance for 5 Years of Mau5
Chart (2015)	Position
US Top Dance/Electronic Albums (Billboard)	12

== Certifications ==
Region	Certification	Certified units/sales
United Kingdom (BPI)	Silver	60,000^{‡}
^{‡} Sales+streaming figures based on certification alone.

== Release history ==
Release history and formats for 5 Years of Mau5
Region	Date	Format	Label
Various	November 21, 2014	CD; digital download	Mau5trap, Virgin Records
United States Canada	November 24, 2014	CD; digital download	Mau5trap, Ultra
