= Steve Duda =

- Origin: Menlo Park, California
- Genres: House, electro house, techno, progressive house, tech house
- Occupations: DJ, record producer, audio engineer, manager, software engineer
- Years active: 1993–present
- Labels: Xfer Records, mau5trap, Play Records

Steve Duda is an American DJ, record producer, audio engineer, manager and software engineer from Menlo Park, California. He is best known for his mid-2000s collaborative electronic music projects with Canadian record producer and DJ Deadmau5 under the names "BSOD" and "WTF?" (also with DJ Aero and Tommy Lee) and owning the record label and digital music software company Xfer Records. He is also known for creating the VST plugin Serum and Serum 2.

== Career ==
=== 1990s: Beginnings ===
Duda studied music composition at the University of California, Santa Cruz. He later became a member of the Santa Cruz rock bands named The Brothers of Other and Razorface. He later left the bands, and went on to work for the American technology company AVID.

In 1997, Duda left Santa Cruz to become an engineer and programmer for the American industrial rock band Nine Inch Nails, for which he was a programmer, multi-instrumentalist, and vocalist on their third studio album The Fragile.

In 1999, Duda moved to Los Angeles to further pursue a career in music.

=== 2000s: BSOD, Xfer Records, and WTF? ===
In 2005, Duda and Canadian record producer Joel Zimmerman (Deadmau5) formed the electro house group BSOD and released their debut single "This Is The Hook" a year later. The song topped the Beatport Top 100 chart, and went on to feature on Deadmau5's 2008 compilation album At Play. Later that year, the group self-released their debut album titled Pay Here To Click.

Earlier that year, Duda also made several uncredited collaborations with Deadmau5. Most notably, he performed vocals for "Porcelain" and co-wrote "Bitches" from Zimmerman's 2006 album A Little Oblique.

In 2007, Duda and Zimmerman founded Xfer Records to continue to release music as BSOD, with the releases of Played Out EP and Last Life EP on Xfer.

In 2008, Duda, Zimmerman, DJ Aero and Tommy Lee formed the electro house group named WTF?. Later that year, they released their debut EP Chicken on Xfer Records.

=== 2010s: Serum and Xfer, Inc. ===
In 2014, Duda programmed, created and released Serum, a VST softsynth to be used by DJs and producers in the electronic dance music scene. Its GUI was designed by Lance Thackeray. Serum later won multiple awards.

In 2016, Xfer partnered with Splice and announced a "rent-to-own" plan for Serum, allowing producers to own the plugin at a monthly cost.

In 2017, Duda announced that Xfer Records would be renamed Xfer, Inc.

In 2025, Duda released Serum 2.

== Discography ==
=== As solo artist ===
==== EPs ====
- Fish (2011)
- Generation (2012)
- Cell By Cell (2013)

==== Remixes ====
- BSOD - Milton (Steve Duda Remix)
- Moguai - ZYVOX (Steve Duda Remix)
- Boom Jinx - Quadcore (Steve Duda Remix)
- Nonplus - Playdate (Steve Duda Remix)

=== With BSOD ===
==== Studio albums ====
- Pay Here To Click (2006)

==== EPs ====
- Played Out (2007)
- Last Life (2008)
- No Way, Get Real (2020)

==== Singles ====
- "This Is The Hook" (2006)
- "Milton" (2008)

=== With WTF? ===
==== EPs ====
- Chicken (2008)
- Redic / CEABA55555 (2008)
