= Science (Deadmau5 and Stevie Appleton song) =

Single by Deadmau5 and Stevie Appleton

Single by Deadmau5 and Stevie Appleton
- Released: February 20, 2026
- Genre: Progressive house, electro house
- Length: 9:48; 3:32 (radio edit)
- Label: Mau5trap
- Songwriters: Joel Zimmerman; Stevie Appleton
- Producer: Deadmau5

Deadmau5 singles chronology
"Ameonna" (2025)	"Science" (2026)

"Science" is a song by Canadian electronic music producer Deadmau5 and singer-songwriter producer Stevie Appleton, released as a single on February 2, 2026. It is the second single for Deadmau5' upcoming 2026 album, and it is an EDM song featuring vocals by Stevie Appleton.

== Background and musical content ==
Regarding the creation of the song, Zimmerman said that “Steve sent the vocal through, thought it was neat so I made a track with it." Appleton revealed that “There was a lot more in the song before I cut it down to just four lines". The song is nearly 10 minutes long, and is compositionally similar to other Deadmau5 songs like The Veldt and I Remember, featuring vocals and long buildups.

== Reception ==
Kelsey Adams of CBC described the track as a "pristine and euphoric [...] emotional climax of a night out with someone you love", also noting that the lyric “science” sometimes sounds like “sadness" in the track, which she stated "obfuscates [Appleton's] true meaning even more".

== Track listing ==
"Science" track listing
No.	Title	Length
1.	"Science" (original mix)	9:48
2.	"Science" (radio edit)	3:32

== Charts ==
Chart performance for "Science"
Chart (2026)	Peak position
Canada CHR/Top 40 (Billboard)	36
US Dance Digital Song Sales (Billboard)	8
US Dance/Mix Show Airplay (Billboard)	22
