= A City in Florida =

Song by Deadmau5

from the album 4×4=12
- Released: December 6, 2010
- Genre: Electro house
- Length: 5:40
- Songwriter(s): Joel Zimmerman
- Producer(s): Joel Zimmerman

"A City in Florida" is an instrumental by Canadian electronic music producer Deadmau5. It was released as the third track from his fifth studio album 4×4=12.

== Background ==
On a Twitch livestream in 2018, Joel Zimmerman revealed that the instrumental originated from a Deadmau5 remix of "Paco Di Bango's World" by Orlando Voorn. Zimmerman intended to officially release the remix, but chose not to, due to sample clearance issues. Zimmerman created a revised version of the remix with all samples from the original removed, and released it as the third track his fifth studio album, 4×4=12. The track title refers to Orlando, Florida, a city sharing the same name as Orlando Voorn.

== In popular culture ==
The instrumental is featured in the 2011 video game Saints Row: The Third, on the fictional radio station K12.

== Charts ==
Following the release of 4x4=12, "A City of Florida" entered the Canadian Hot 100.

Chart (2010)	Peak position
Canadian Hot 100 (Billboard)	83
Canadian Digital Song Sales (Billboard)	52
US Dance/Electronic Digital Songs (Billboard)	7
