= When the Summer Dies =

Single by Deadmau5 and Lights

Single by Deadmau5 and Lights
- Released: July 16, 2021
- Genre: Progressive house, electro house, dance
- Length: 5:29 (Original mix); 4:00 (Meowingtons remix)
- Label: Mau5trap
- Songwriters: Joel Zimmerman; Lights
- Producer: Deadmau5

Deadmau5 singles chronology
"Hypnocurrency" (2021)	"When the Summer Dies" (2021)	"Hyperlandia" (2021)

Lights singles chronology
"Did It To Myself" (2021)	"When the Summer Dies" (2021)	"Prodigal Daughter" (2021)

When the Summer Dies is a song by Canadian electronic music producer Deadmau5, released in 2021. It is the second time that Deadmau5 collaborated with Lights, with following "Drama Free" in 2018. It is an electronic dance music song featuring vocals by Lights.

== Track listing ==
When the Summer Dies track listing
No.	Title	Length
1.	"When the Summer Dies"	5:29

== Track listing ==
When the Summer Dies (meowingtons remix) track listing
No.	Title	Length
1.	"When the Summer Dies (meowingtons remix)"	4:00

== Notes ==
Originally released on July 23, 2021, as "When The Summer Dies (Alternative Mix)". Purchasing platforms started to update the release on July 28, 2021, to the new title and artwork.

== Charts ==
Chart performance for "When the Summer Dies"
Chart (2021)	Peak position
Canadian Hot Digital Song Sales (Billboard)	24
US Hot Dance/Electronic Songs (Billboard)	32
