= At Play Vol. 2 =

Compilation album by Deadmau5
- Released: November 17, 2009
- Recorded: 2006–2007
- Genres: Progressive house, electro house
- Length: 64:45

Deadmau5 chronology
For Lack of a Better Name (2009)	At Play Vol. 2 (2009)	4×4=12 (2010)

At Play Vol. 2 is a compilation album by Canadian electronic music producer Deadmau5, following from the success of the first At Play album. The album features ten "DJ friendly" tracks. However, unlike its predecessor At Play, the album is mixed, yet the track markers are divided in a manner that allows DJs to also utilize them for mixing.

== Track listing ==
At Play Vol. 2 track listing
No.	Title	Artist	Length
1.	"Outta My Life" (Touch Mix)	Billy Newton-Davis vs. Deadmau5	6:08
2.	"Attention Whore"	Melleefresh vs. Deadmau5	6:32
3.	"Mr. G"	Deadmau5	5:15
4.	"Reduction"	Deadmau5	6:45
5.	"This Is Also the Hook"	BSOD	6:02
6.	"Orca"	Deadmau5	8:32
7.	"Tau V2"	Deadmau5	7:02
8.	"Sex Slave"	Melleefresh vs. Deadmau5	6:04
9.	"This Noise"	Deadmau5	7:04
10.	"R My Dreams"	Billy Newton-Davis vs. Deadmau5	6:01
Total length:			64:45
