= Some Chords =

- November 2010 release cover

Single by Deadmau5

from the album 4×4=12
- Released: 3 May 2010
- Recorded: 2010
- Genre: Electro house, progressive house
- Length: 7:23
- Label: Mau5trap; Ultra; Virgin
- Songwriter: Joel Zimmerman

Deadmau5 singles chronology
"Strobe" (2009)	"Some Chords" (2010)	"Animal Rights" (2010)

"Some Chords" is an instrumental by Canadian electronic music producer Deadmau5, released on 3 May 2010 as the first single from his fifth studio album 4×4=12. The song peaked at 13 on the Dance/Electronic Digital Song Sales chart in the US, and 120 in the UK Singles Chart. In 2014, a remix by Dillon Francis was released for Deadmau5's compilation album, 5 Years of Mau5.

== In popular culture ==
The track was featured in an episode of CSI: Crime Scene Investigation entitled "Pool Shark". It was also included in the soundtrack of the game The Sims 3, only for the PS3/Xbox 360 console version.

== Remixes ==
A remix by Dillon Francis was released for the 5 Years of Mau5 compilation album in 2014. The remix charted in the US, peaking at 50 in the Dance/Electronic Songs chart. A remix contest was also hosted by Beatport Play, in which participants were given the parts to rework Francis' version of the song. The winner of the contest was Andrei Stephen, whose remix is expected to see an official release through Mau5trap, and the runner up was Approaching Nirvana, as determined by the community's votes.

== Music video ==
Deadmau5 had held a competition using Wooshii which asked fans to create a video to go along with the song. The competition lasted 2 weeks and had over 82 pitches. The winning video was directed by Chris Lee, and produced by Pommez Films. It features a person named Tom who has a snare drum for a head.

== Track listing ==
Digital download (US)
No.	Title	Length
1.	"Some Chords (Original Mix)"	7:23

Digital download (international)
No.	Title	Length
1.	"Some Chords (Radio Edit)"	6:55

== Charts ==
Chart (2010)	Peak position
US Dance/Electronic Digital Song Sales (Billboard)	13
UK Singles Chart (OCC)	120

=== Dillon Francis Remix ===
Chart (2014)	Peak position
US Hot Dance/Electronic Songs (Billboard)	50
US Dance/Electronic Digital Song Sales (Billboard)	44
