= Sydney Blu =

- Also known as: Sydney Blu
- Born: Joanne Judith-Mary Hill; November 22, 1977 (age 48)
- Origin: Thunder Bay, Ontario, Canada
- Genres: Electronic, house, techno
- Occupations: DJ, Producer
- Instruments: CDJ, Mixer, Ableton Live, Pro Tools, Apple Logic Pro, Sampler
- Years active: 2000–present
- Labels: Blu Music, Mau5trap, Knee Deep in Sound, VIVa Music, Mad Tech Records
- Website: www.sydneyblu.com

Sydney Blu (born Joanne Judith-Mary Hill; November 22, 1977) is a Canadian DJ, producer, and record label owner. Blu is known for large, live event performances at major venues and dance music festivals around the world and releases on multiple labels, including her own Blu Music. Her singles, "Give It Up For Me" and "Senses and the Mind" broke beatport.com sales records, and launched her label "Blu Music" with her single "Instinct". In January 2019 Blu relocated to Berlin Germany to produce her next studio album and experience Berlin club culture.
