= Strobe (instrumental) =

Single by Deadmau5

from the album For Lack of a Better Name
- Released: 3 September 2009
- Genre: Progressive house; ambient; trance; electro
- Length: 10:34 (original mix); 6:21 (club edit); 3:34 (radio edit)
- Label: Mau5trap; Ultra; Virgin
- Songwriter: Joel Zimmerman
- Producer: Deadmau5

Deadmau5 singles chronology
| "Ghosts 'n' Stuff" (2009) | "Strobe" (2009) | "Some Chords" (2010) |

"Strobe" is an instrumental by Canadian electronic music producer Deadmau5. It was released as the sixth and final single from his fourth studio album, For Lack of a Better Name, on 3 September 2009. It charted at numbers 122 and 13 on the UK Singles Chart and UK Dance Chart. The track featured on Deadmau5's greatest hits album, 5 Years of Mau5. A live version was featured on the iTunes version of Album Title Goes Here and an orchestral version was featured on Where's the Drop?.

== Background ==
The song originated from a track titled "Then We Stood Still", which was used in a YouTube video uploaded to Zimmerman's account several months prior to its release. A live version was released exclusively on the iTunes version of his sixth studio album Album Title Goes Here.

In 2016, "Strobe" received an update when Deadmau5's record label Mau5trap released the album Strobe (Remixes), in celebration of the one hundredth release on the label. This release included remixes from Dimension, Feed Me, Com Truise, Lane 8, and Attlas.

In 2017, Billboard Dance listed "Strobe" as Deadmau5's best song of all time on their list of the artist's 20 best tracks.

In 2018, Deadmau5 and Gregory Reveret recorded an orchestral version of "Strobe" for the album Where's the Drop?.

== Track listing ==
Digital download
| No. | Title | Length |
|---|---|---|
| 1. | "Strobe" (Radio Edit) | 3:34 |
| 2. | "Strobe" (Club Edit) | 6:21 |
| 3. | "Strobe" (Michael Woods Remix) | 6:46 |
| 4. | "Strobe" (Plump DJs Remix) | 5:42 |
| 5. | "Strobe" (DJ Marky & S.P.Y. Remix) | 6:57 |
| 6. | "Strobe" (Full Length Version) | 10:34 |
| Total length: | | 39:54 |

Digital download – Remixes
| No. | Title | Length |
|---|---|---|
| 1. | "Strobe" (Feed Me Remix) | 9:26 |
| 2. | "Strobe" (Com Truise Remix) | 6:42 |
| 3. | "Strobe" (Dimension Club Mix) | 5:08 |
| 4. | "Strobe" (Lane 8 Remix) | 7:17 |
| 5. | "Strobe" (ATTLAS Remix) | 8:21 |
| Total length: | | 36:54 |

Digital download – Dimension Remix
| No. | Title | Length |
|---|---|---|
| 1. | "Strobe" (Dimension Remix) | 8:28 |

== Charts ==
Chart performance for "Strobe"
| Chart (2009–2010) | Peak position |
|---|---|
| UK Singles Chart | 122 |
| UK Dance (OCC) | 13 |
| US Dance/Electronic Digital Songs | 29 |
| US Dance Singles Sales (Billboard) | 6 |
