= Bridged by a Lightwave =

Single by Deadmau5 and Kiesza

Single by Deadmau5 and Kiesza
- Released: November 10, 2020
- Genre: Progressive house, electro house
- Length: 9:22 (original mix); 2:52 (radio edit)
- Label: Mau5trap
- Songwriters: Joel Zimmerman; Kiesa Rae Ellestad
- Producer: Deadmau5

Deadmau5 singles chronology
"Pomegranate" (2020)	"Bridged by a Lightwave" (2020)	"Channel 43" (2021)

Kiesza singles chronology
"Sensuum Defectui" (2020)	"Bridged by a Lightwave" (2020)	"Eleanor Rigby" (2020)

"Bridged by a Lightwave" is a song by Canadian electronic music producer Deadmau5 and singer-songwriter Kiesza, released as a single on November 10, 2020. It is an EDM song featuring vocals by Kiesza.

== Background ==
Kiesza stated in an interview that the lyrics came to her while stuck in a traffic jam in London for well over an hour causing her to miss a flight. She was inspired by seeing the city lights through the window and hastily recorded a demo on her cellphone.

The lyrics were originally written for the Deadmau5 track Hyperlandia. A demo version with Keisza's performance was released on Soundcloud. Unhappy with the original track, Joel experimented with slowing down the lyrics and reworked it into Bridge by a Lightwave. Keisza re-recorded the performance with changed different lyrics.

== Track listing ==
"Bridged by a Lightwave" track listing
No.	Title	Length
1.	"Bridged by a Lightwave" (original mix)	9:22
2.	"Bridged by a Lightwave" (radio edit)	2:52
3.	"Bridged by a Lightwave" (alternative mix)	5:52
4.	"Bridged by a Lightwave" (acoustic)	3:12
5.	"Bridged by a Lightwave" (Tommy Trash remix)	3:41
6.	"Bridged by a Lightwave" (Lamorn remix)	4:58

== Charts ==
Chart performance for "Bridged by a Lightwave"
Chart (2020)	Peak position
Canadian Hot Digital Song Sales (Billboard)	29
US Hot Dance/Electronic Songs (Billboard)	20
US Dance/Electronic Digital Song Sales (Billboard)	11
US Dance Airplay (Billboard)	22
