= Aural Psynapse =

Single by Deadmau5

from the album Deadmau5 Circa 1998–2002 and 5 Years of Mau5
- Released: November 4, 2011
- Recorded: 2001 (original); 2011 (remake)
- Genre: Progressive house, trance
- Length: 7:30
- Label: Mau5trap; Ultra (US/Canada)
- Songwriter: Joel Zimmerman
- Producer: Joel Zimmerman

Deadmau5 singles chronology
"Raise Your Weapon" (2011)	"Aural Psynapse" (2011)	"Maths" (2012)

"Aural Psynapse" is an instrumental recording by Canadian electronic music producer Deadmau5. It was released on November 4, 2011, by Mau5trap and Ultra Records (US and Canada) and featured on his 2014 greatest hits album 5 Years of Mau5.

== Background ==
The original version of the track was recorded in 2001 and uploaded to SectionZ on June 17, 2002, under the alias Halcyon441 (Zimmerman's screen name at the time) on the self-released compilation Deadmau5 Circa 1998–2002.

Zimmerman previewed a remake in April 2011 through Ustream while it was a work in progress, noting it was originally "a track [he] made [...] ten years ago". The remake even uses a sample from the original 2001 release.

It was first played live in May 2011 during live in Malaysia and August 2011 during the Meowingtons Hax Tour.

== Release ==
The track was released on November 4, 2011. In December 2011, the song was featured in the tour Hard x Mouth Taped Shut. The song was also featured on the 2014 compilation album 5 Years of Mau5.

== Track listing ==
Digital download
No.	Title	Length
1.	"Aural Psynapse" (Original Mix)	7:30

== Appearances ==
The song "Aural Psynapse" from the 2001 version of the album Deadmau5 Circa 1998–2002 appears in the Miniclip game Little Rocketman.

== Charts ==
Chart (2012)	Peak position
Canadian Hot 100 (Billboard)	38
Canadian Digital Song Sales (Billboard)	16
UK Singles Chart (Official Charts Company)	150
UK Dance (Official Charts)	27
UK Indie (Official Charts)	19
US Bubbling Under Hot 100 Singles	3
US Dance/Electronic Digital Songs (Billboard)	7
US Digital Songs (Billboard)	72
US Heatseekers Songs (Billboard)	16

== Certifications ==
Region	Certification	Certified units/sales
Canada (Music Canada)	Gold	40,000^{*}
^{*} Sales figures based on certification alone.
