= Greta Svabo Bech =

Faroese singer-songwriter (born 1987)

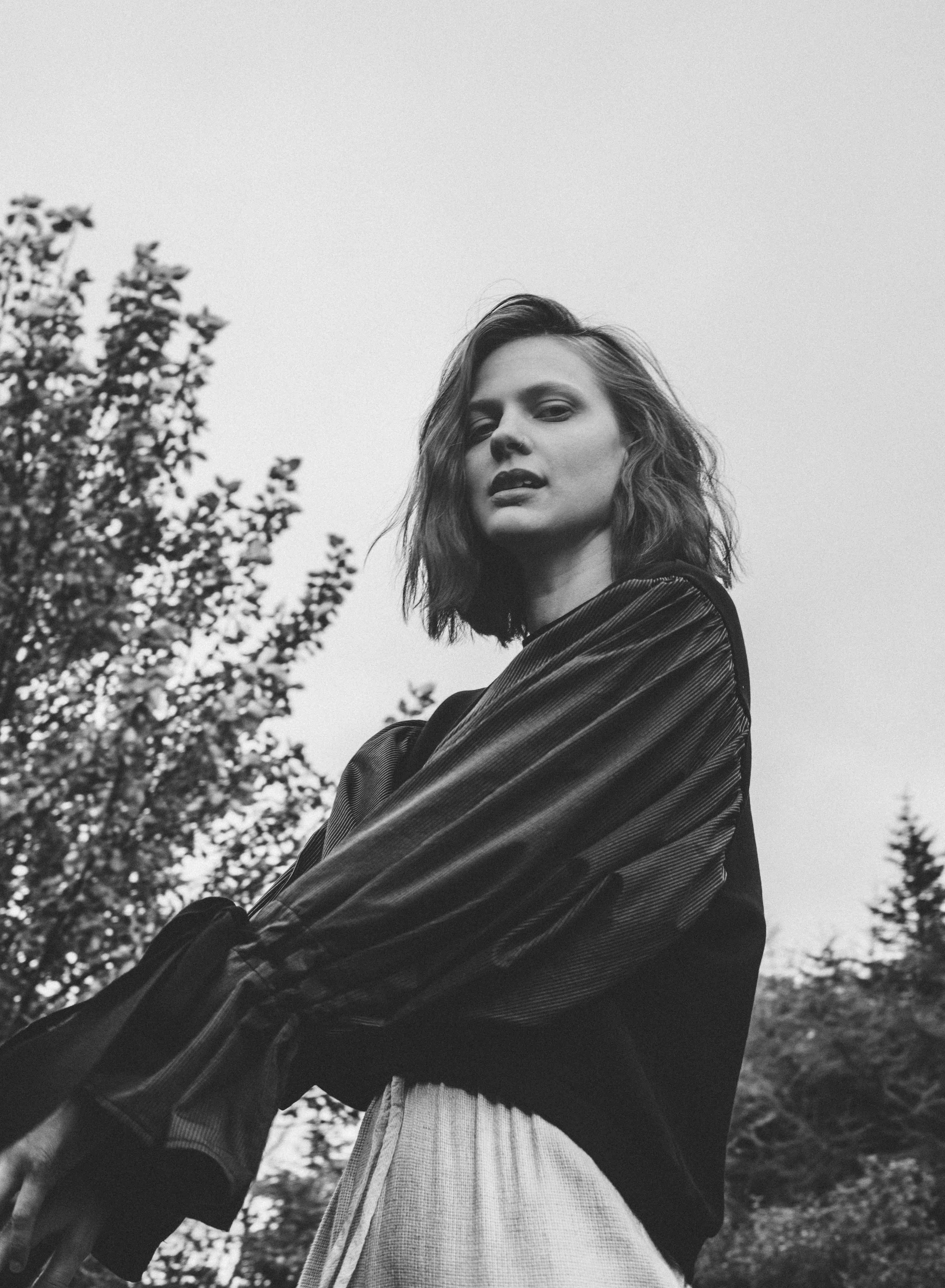
- Bech in 2017

Background information
- Born: 1987 (age 38–39); Tórshavn, Faroe Islands
- Genres: Electropop; alternative pop; electronic
- Occupation: Singer-songwriter
- Instrument: Vocals
- Years active: 2008–present
- Website: gretasvabobech.com

Greta Svabo Bech (born 1987 in Tórshavn) is a Faroese singer-songwriter. She first became known for her work with the Canadian producer Deadmau5, when "Raise Your Weapon" was nominated for Best Dance Record at the 2011 Grammy Awards and hit the 100 spot on the Billboard Hot 100. Bech went on to work with the Italian artists the Bloody Beetroots on their second album, Hide, and with Ludovico Einaudi on the remix version of his album In a Time Lapse. She released her debut solo album, Beautiful Obscenery, in 2026.

== Discography ==
=== Studio albums ===
- Beautiful Obscenery (2026)

=== EPs ===
- Shut Up & Sing Reloaded (2013)
- Bones (2019)
- Uncovered (2026)

=== Singles ===
- "Shut Up & Sing" (2013)
- "Broken Bones" (2013)
- "Brave Moon" (2013)
- "All My Bones" (2019)
- "Before You Go" (2019)
- "Breathe" (2021)
- "Dominoes" (2021)
- "Poison" (2021)
- "Changes" (2024)
- "Just a Feeling" (2024)
- "Song for Bella" (2024)
- "Efflorescence" (2024)
- "Sober" (2025)
- "My Body Is a Cage" (2025)
- "Islands" (2025)
- "Over the Moon" (2026)

=== As featured artist ===
- "Smells Like Teen Spirit" – 6ix Toys (2011)
- "Another Day" – 6ix Toys (2011)
- "Black or White" – 6ix Toys (2011)
- "Fire Inside" – Gemini (2012)
- "Invisible" – The Bloody Beetroots (2017)
- "The Great Run" – The Bloody Beetroots (2017)
- "tu: Orbit" – Tom Ashbrook (2022)
- "Erase" – Rebūke (2025)

=== Other appearances ===
Year	Song	Artist	Album	Contribution
2010	"Raise Your Weapon"	Deadmau5	4×4=12	Vocalist
2013	"My Love"	Cher	Closer to the Truth	Co-writer
2013	"Circles"	Ludovico Einaudi and Greta Svabo Bech	In a Time Lapse (Ludovico Einaudi Remixes, EP)	Vocalist/writer
2013	"Runaway"	The Bloody Beetroots	Hide	Vocalist/co-writer
2013	"Chronicles of a Fallen Love"	The Bloody Beetroots	Hide	Vocalist/co-writer

== Awards and nominations ==
Year	Recipient	Award	Category	Result
2012	"Raise Your Weapon" Deadmau5 ft. Greta Svabo Bech	54th Annual Grammy Awards	Best Dance Recording	Nominated
2012	Greta Svabo Bech	Planet Awards 2012 in the Faroe Islands	Best Female Artist	Nominated
2014	Greta Svabo Bech	Faroese Music Awards	Female Artist of the Year (pop)	Won
2014	Greta Svabo Bech	Faroese Music Awards	Video of the Year ("Broken Bones")	Won
2015	Greta Svabo Bech	Faroese Music Awards	Female Artist of the Year (pop)	Won
2015	Greta Svabo Bech	Faroese Music Awards	Song of the Year ("Myrkablátt")	Won
