= Animal Rights (instrumental) =

Single by Deadmau5 and Wolfgang Gartner

from the album 4×4=12
- Released: 6 September 2010
- Recorded: 2010
- Genre: Electro house
- Length: 2:37 (Radio Edit); 6:15 (Full Version)
- Label: Mau5trap; Ultra Records (US/Canada); Virgin Records (Rest of world)
- Songwriters: Joel Zimmerman, Joey Youngman

Deadmau5 singles chronology
"Some Chords" (2010)	"Animal Rights" (2010)	"Sofi Needs a Ladder" (2010)

Wolfgang Gartner singles chronology
"Conscindo" (2010)	"Animal Rights" (2010)	"Forever" (2011)

"Animal Rights" is an instrumental by Canadian electronic music producer Deadmau5 and American DJ Wolfgang Gartner. It was released on 6 September 2010, as the 2nd single from Deadmau5's fifth studio album, 4×4=12.

== Background ==
The single debuted on BBC Radio 1's coverage of Creamfields 2010 on 28 August 2010, at which Deadmau5 was playing. On 1 December 2010, the song was added to BBC Radio 1's playlist. Following this, the song entered the UK Singles Chart and peaked at number 70, and also reached number 10 in the UK Dance Chart.

== Track listing ==
Digital download and vinyl
No.	Title	Length
1.	"Animal Rights"	6:15

Promo CD
No.	Title	Length
1.	"Animal Rights (Original Mix)"	6:15
2.	"Animal Rights (Radio Edit)"	2:36

== Charts ==
Chart (2010)	Peak position
Canadian Hot 100 (Billboard)	72
UK Singles (OCC)	70
UK Dance (OCC)	10
US Dance/Electronic Digital Songs (Billboard)	34
