= 4×4=12 =

Studio album by Deadmau5
- Released: December 6, 2010
- Recorded: 2007–2010
- Genres: Electro house; progressive house; techno; dubstep
- Length: 76:01 (unmixed version); 69:54 (mixed version)
- Labels: Mau5trap; Ultra; Virgin
- Producer: Joel Zimmerman

Deadmau5 chronology
At Play Vol. 2 (2009)	4×4=12 (2010)	Album Title Goes Here (2012)

Singles from 4×4=12
- 1. "Some Chords" Released: May 3, 2010; 2. "Animal Rights" Released: September 6, 2010; 3. "Sofi Needs a Ladder" Released: November 1, 2010; 4. "Right This Second" Released: November 14, 2010; 5. "Bad Selection" Released: November 21, 2010; 6. "Raise Your Weapon" Released: May 23, 2011

4×4=12 (pronounced "four times four equals twelve") is the fifth studio album by Canadian electronic music producer Deadmau5, released on December 7, 2010, by Virgin Records, Ultra Records and Mau5trap. The album's title refers to a miscalculation made by Deadmau5 on his Ustream channel, where he mistakenly said that his live setup of four banks of four "equals 12" instead of 16. The album received a nomination at the 54th Grammy Awards for Best Dance/Electronica Album.

== Promotion ==
Deadmau5 was the house DJ at the 2010 MTV Video Music Awards show hosted by Chelsea Handler in Los Angeles, California on September 12. He opened the event with "Some Chords", then as the night progressed, he played "Sofi Needs a Ladder", "Cthulhu Sleeps", and "Animal Rights". Deadmau5 also performed at the 54th Grammy Awards in 2012. First, he performed with Foo Fighters "Rope" (Deadmau5 Remix), and then played "Raise Your Weapon". During the performance, Zimmerman wore a second more advanced and safer (but still heavy) variation of his iconic LED mau5head.

== Release ==
4×4=12 was released internationally on December 6, 2010 by Virgin Records, and released in the United States through Ultra Records and Deadmau5's record label Mau5trap; on December 7, 2010. On 23 February 2011, Ultra Records released the Japanese version of the album, which was renamed simply to Deadmau5 (Note: Japanese: デッドマウス, Hepburn: Deddomausu). The self-titled release was bundled with his earlier singles "Ghosts 'n' Stuff" and "I Remember".

On iTunes, the international mixed CD version of the album has the track names "A City In Florida" as "City In Florida", "Cthulhu Sleeps" as "Cthulhu Steps" and "Raise Your Weapon" as "Raise Your Weapons". This has not been confirmed as intentional or unintentional.

== Singles ==
"Some Chords" was released as the first official single from the album on May 3, 2010 exclusively on Beatport, later released on iTunes, on November 7, 2010. "Animal Rights", a collaboration with American DJ Wolfgang Gartner, was the second single from the album, released exclusively on Beatport on September 6, 2010 and followed by release on other digital download stores on September 17, 2010. The third single was "Sofi Needs a Ladder", released on October 31, 2010. It features vocals from Sofi and is the highest-charting single in the UK, reaching number 68. On November 14, the fourth single "Right This Second" was released peaking at number 79 on US charts and 100 on UK charts. Later the same month, the fifth single "Bad Selection" was released charting at 137 on the UK charts. The sixth and final single was "Raise Your Weapon", a song featuring vocals from Greta Svabo Bech and was co-produced by Cydney Sheffield and Skrillex, released on May 23, 2011, became a hit on the charts. It became his first song to chart on the US Billboard Hot 100, as well as reaching 117 on the UK charts.

== Critical reception ==
Professional ratings
Aggregate scores
Source	Rating
Metacritic	66/100
Review scores
Source	Rating
AllMusic	3.5/5 stars
Alternative Press	3.5/5 stars
Consequence of Sound	4/5 stars
Entertainment Weekly	B−
The Guardian	3/5 stars
Paste	7.3/10
Q	4/5 stars
Rolling Stone	3/5 stars
Slant Magazine	2.5/5 stars
Spin	5/10

The album was generally well received among music critics. Metacritic assigned it an average score of 66 out of 100, based on 13 reviews. Will Hermes of Rolling Stone touted the album writing, "4×4=12 is audacious, mixing generic house grooves with electric fare." Many reviewers praised the album for its universal appeal to a diverse audience. Annie Zaleski of Alternative Press wrote, "The collection is mostly instrumental tracks, ranging in style from insistent progressive house to watery techno...Without vocals to provide structure, 4×4=12's variety stems from Deadmau5's sense of dynamics and pacing, as well as his diverse sonic influences".

However, some critics were less enthusiastic. Allison Stewart of The Washington Post stated, "4×4 is a breakthrough album that doesn't feel like a breakthrough album. Not accessible or crowd-pleasing enough to court non-electronic music fans, not adventurous enough to satisfy die-hards, it pleases, but it rarely dazzles." Dave Simpson of The Guardian shared in Stewart's sentiments by noting, "Undoubtedly, the Deadmau5 appeal hinges on the astonishing live show in which Zimmerman performs in a giant, illuminated mouse's head, but it wouldn't work without his tracks. His third production compilation again shows that he is a master at doing simple electro house music very well: humongous beats and basslines blend with straightforward chord progressions and, when interest may start to lag, sonic diversions."

== Commercial performance ==
4×4=12 proved to become a breakthrough commercial success for Deadmau5 when it became his first studio album to chart on the Billboard 200. It eventually peaked within the top 50 of the Billboard Top 200 and has spent 66 weeks on the chart. It also narrowly missed the top spot of the Billboard Electronic albums, reaching number two.

Internationally, the album was received warmly as well. It managed to chart within the Top 40 of various European nations, replicating and in many cases eclipsing the chart success of his previous efforts. In the United Kingdom, however, the album achieved a lower peak compared to his previous albums, which all entered the top 20, missing the Top 40 altogether.

== Track listing ==
Unmixed version (US version)
No.	Title	Writer(s)	Length
1.	"Some Chords"	Joel Zimmerman	7:24
2.	"Sofi Needs a Ladder" (featuring SOFI)	Zimmerman; Sofia Toufa	6:43
3.	"A City in Florida"	Zimmerman	5:40
4.	"Bad Selection"	Zimmerman; Chester "DJ Aero" Deitz	5:32
5.	"Animal Rights" (with Wolfgang Gartner)	Zimmerman; Joey Youngman	6:15
6.	"I Said" (Michael Woods Remix) (with Chris Lake)	Zimmerman; Christopher Lake	7:06
7.	"Cthulhu Sleeps"	Zimmerman	10:34
8.	"Right This Second"	Zimmerman	7:50
9.	"Raise Your Weapon" (featuring Greta Svabo Bech)	Zimmerman; Cydney Sheffield; Sonny Moore	8:22
10.	"One Trick Pony" (featuring SOFI)	Zimmerman; Toufa	3:59
11.	"Everything Before"	Zimmerman	6:36

Continuous mix version (International version)
No.	Title	Length
1.	"Some Chords"	8:04
2.	"Sofi Needs a Ladder" (featuring SOFI)	5:34
3.	"A City in Florida"	5:02
4.	"Bad Selection"	5:01
5.	"Animal Rights" (with Wolfgang Gartner)	5:00
6.	"I Said" (Michael Woods Remix) (with Chris Lake)	5:52
7.	"Cthulhu Sleeps"	9:59
8.	"Right This Second"	7:24
9.	"Raise Your Weapon" (featuring Greta Svabo Bech)	8:16
10.	"One Trick Pony" (featuring SOFI)	3:36
11.	"Everything Before"	6:06

International iTunes version
No.	Title	Length
1.	"4×4=12 (Continuous Mix)"	69:54
2.	"Some Chords"	6:55
3.	"Sofi Needs a Ladder" (featuring SOFI)	6:41
4.	"A City in Florida"	5:40
5.	"Bad Selection"	5:33
6.	"Animal Rights" (with Wolfgang Gartner)	6:15
7.	"I Said" (Michael Woods Remix) (with Chris Lake)	7:06
8.	"Cthulhu Sleeps"	9:59
9.	"Right This Second"	6:50
10.	"Raise Your Weapon (Edit)" (featuring Greta Svabo Bech)	6:57
11.	"One Trick Pony" (featuring SOFI)	3:59
12.	"Everything Before"	6:36

US and Canada iTunes version
No.	Title	Length
1.	"4×4=12 (Continuous Mix)"	69:54
2.	"Some Chords"	6:55
3.	"Sofi Needs a Ladder" (featuring SOFI)	6:41
4.	"A City in Florida"	5:40
5.	"Bad Selection"	5:33
6.	"Animal Rights" (with Wolfgang Gartner)	6:15
7.	"I Said" (Michael Woods Remix) (with Chris Lake)	7:06
8.	"Cthulhu Sleeps"	9:59
9.	"Right This Second"	6:50
10.	"Raise Your Weapon" (Edit) (featuring Greta Svabo Bech)	6:57
11.	"One Trick Pony" (featuring SOFI)	3:59
12.	"Everything Before"	6:36

Japanese version – Deadmau5
No.	Title	Length
1.	"Ghosts 'n' Stuff" (featuring Rob Swire)	3:38
2.	"Some Chords"	7:49
3.	"Sofi Needs a Ladder" (featuring SOFI)	5:34
4.	"A City in Florida"	5:02
5.	"Bad Selection" (featuring DJ Aero)	5:01
6.	"Animal Rights" (with Wolfgang Gartner)	5:00
7.	"I Said" (Michael Woods Remix) (with Chris Lake)	5:52
8.	"Cthulhu Sleeps"	10:00
9.	"Right This Second"	6:50
10.	"Raise Your Weapon" (featuring Greta Svabo Bech)	8:16
11.	"One Trick Pony" (featuring SOFI)	3:36
12.	"Everything Before"	6:00
13.	"I Remember" (with Kaskade)	4:35

iTunes music videos
No.	Title	Length
1.	"Some Chords" (live from Brixton)	3:27
2.	"Sofi Needs a Ladder" (live from Brixton)	6:30
3.	"Cthulhu Sleeps" (live from Brixton)	9:23
4.	"Bad Selection" (live from Brixton)	4:39
5.	"Right This Second" (live from Brixton)	3:45

=== Double LP version ===
Side A
No.	Title	Length
1.	"Sofi Needs a Ladder" (featuring SOFI)	6:43
2.	"A City in Florida"	5:40
3.	"Animal Rights" (with Wolfgang Gartner)	6:15

Side B
No.	Title	Length
1.	"Cthulhu Sleeps"	10:35
2.	"Some Chords"	7:23

Side C
No.	Title	Length
1.	"I Said" (Michael Woods Remix) (with Chris Lake)	7:06
2.	"Bad Selection"	5:33
3.	"Right This Second"	7:48

Side D
No.	Title	Length
1.	"Raise Your Weapon" (featuring Greta Svabo Bech)	8:20
2.	"One Trick Pony" (featuring SOFI)	3:59
3.	"Everything Before"	6:36

== Charts ==
=== Weekly charts ===
Weekly chart performance for 4×4=12
Chart (2010–2012)	Peak position
Australian Albums (ARIA)	53
Australian Dance Albums (ARIA)	6
Belgian Albums (Ultratop Flanders)	69
Canadian Albums (Billboard)	7
Dutch Albums (Album Top 100)	82
Irish Albums (IRMA)	34
Scottish Albums (Official Charts)	41
Swiss Albums (Schweizer Hitparade)	56
UK Albums (Official Charts)	48
US Billboard 200	47
US Top Dance Albums (Billboard)	2

=== Year-end charts ===
Year-end chart performance for 4×4=12
Chart (2011)	Position
US Billboard 200	154
US Top Dance/Electronic Albums (Billboard)	5
Chart (2012)	Position
US Top Dance/Electronic Albums (Billboard)	10

== Certifications ==
Certifications for 4×4=12
Region	Certification	Certified units/sales
Canada (Music Canada)	Platinum	80,000^{^}
United Kingdom (BPI)	Gold	100,000^{‡}
United States (RIAA)	Gold	500,000^{^}
^{^} Shipments figures based on certification alone.^{‡} Sales+streaming figures based on certification alone.

== Release history ==
Release history for 4×4=12
Region	Date	Format	Label
Various	6 December 2010	CD; LP; digital download	Virgin/EMI; Mau5trap
United States and Canada	7 December 2010	CD; LP; digital download	Ultra
