= Raise Your Weapon =

Single by Deadmau5 featuring Greta Svabo Bech

from the album 4×4=12
- Released: May 23, 2011
- Genre: Progressive house; dubstep
- Length: 3:22 (radio edit); 8:22 (album version)
- Label: Mau5trap; Ultra; Virgin
- Songwriters: Joel Zimmerman; Cydney Sheffield; Sonny Moore
- Producer: Deadmau5

Deadmau5 singles chronology
"Sofi Needs a Ladder" (2010)	"Raise Your Weapon" (2011)	"Aural Psynapse" (2011)

"Raise Your Weapon" is a song by Canadian electronic music producer Deadmau5 featuring vocals from Faroese singer Greta Svabo Bech. It was released on May 23, 2011 as the sixth and final single from his fifth studio album 4×4=12. The song was written by Deadmau5, Cydney Sheffield and Skrillex. Musically, "Raise Your Weapon" is a progressive house song that begins with a piano melody and Bech's vocals and ends with a dubstep breakdown with the vocals repeated. The song received generally positive reviews from music critics, with some highlighting it as a standout track from the album. It reached number 100 on the Billboard Hot 100, making it his first song to make an entry on the chart. It also reached number 117 on the UK Singles Chart. The song was nominated at the 54th Grammy Awards for Best Dance Recording, where he also performed the song in a sequence with David Guetta, Chris Brown, Lil Wayne and Foo Fighters, with the other songs being "I Can Only Imagine" and "Rope".

== Critical reception ==
"Raise Your Weapon" received generally positive reviews from music critics. David Jeffries from AllMusic gave the song a positive review, saying, "When the one-two punch of "Raise Your Weapon" and "One Trick Pony" introduce the Mau5's newfound love of dubstep, you've got just enough variety." Will Hermes of Rolling Stone also gave a positive review, "The masterstroke is "Raise Your Weapon," which breaks down into a sick dubstep beat. "How does it feel now, to watch it burn?" asks singer Greta Svabo Bech before the bass hits". Dave Simpson of The Guardian said "Raise Your Weapon – featuring Greta Svabo Bech's soulful vocal – shows he can turn his hand to thoughtful sounds". Alex Denney of BBC Music "Raise Your Weapons lurches suddenly from vocal-led, ambient house into the dentist-drill arsenal of sounds more commonly associated with Benga". Michelangelo Matos of The A.V. Club gave the song a mixed review, calling Bech's verses "half-baked" and the use of dubstep "by-the-numbers".

== Chart performance ==
In the United Kingdom, the song charted at number 117 on the UK Singles Chart. In the United States, the song debuted at number 100 on the Billboard Hot 100 on the issue date of March 3, 2012 as well as number 11 on the Heatseekers Songs chart. It also made an entry at number 93 on the Canadian Hot 100. According to Keith Caulfield of Billboard, its latest chart entries is possibly due to a sales boost after performing at the 54th Grammy Awards along with David Guetta, Chris Brown, Lil Wayne and Foo Fighters.

== Track listing ==
Digital download EP Remixes
No.	Title	Length
1.	"Raise Your Weapon" (radio edit)	3:23
2.	"Raise Your Weapon" (album version)	8:23
3.	"Raise Your Weapon" (Madeon extended remix)	4:15
4.	"Raise Your Weapon" (Noisia remix)	5:36
5.	"Raise Your Weapon" (Stimming remix)	7:18

Digital Download
No.	Title	Length
1.	"Raise Your Weapon"	8:22

== Credits and personnel ==
Credits adapted from the liner notes of 4×4=12.

Management

- Published by EMI Music Publishing Ltd. / Cupcake Revolution (BMI) and Kobalt Music Publishing

Personnel

- Joel Zimmerman – lead artist, songwriter, producer, arrangement
- Greta Svabo Bech – featured artist
- Cydney Sheffield – songwriter
- Sonny Moore – songwriter

== Charts ==
Chart performance for "Raise Your Weapon"
Chart (2011–2012)	Peak position
Belgium Dance (Ultratip Flanders)	1
Belgium (Ultratip Bubbling Under Wallonia)	16
Belgium Dance (Ultratop Wallonia)	34
Canada Hot 100 (Billboard)	93
UK Singles (OCC)	117
US Billboard Hot 100	100
US Dance/Electronic Digital Song Sales (Billboard)	15
US Dance/Mix Show Airplay (Billboard)	7
US Dance Singles Sales (Billboard)	2

== Certifications ==
Region	Certification	Certified units/sales
Canada (Music Canada)	Platinum	80,000^{‡}
^{‡} Sales+streaming figures based on certification alone.
