= Sofia Toufa =

German rapper (born 1983)

Sofi
- Born: Sofia Toufa; August 13, 1983 (age 43); Germany
- Other name: Es-Tee
- Occupations: Singer; rapper
- Musical career
- Genres: Pop; electronic
- Instrument: Vocals
- Labels: Mercury; Def Jam; mau5trap
- Formerly of: DaNaCeE
- Website: sofinow.com

Sofia Toufa (born August 13, 1983), known by her stage name SOFI is a German-Greek singer and rapper.

== Background ==
Toufa started her musical career at the age of 13 through her duo group DaNaCeE, which she formed alongside her sister, Anastasia Toufa, signed to Def Jam Germany. The band has supported acts such as Destiny’s Child and Usher. Later, Toufa co-choreographed the video for Avril Lavigne’s hit-single "Girlfriend" and she was hired to co-choreograph, sing and dance on her 2008's Best Damn World Tour. In 2009, she toured the world as back-up singer for Britney Spears on her Circus 2009 World Tour.

In 2010, Sofia collaborated with Deadmau5 on his single "Sofi Needs a Ladder", which went on to win a 2011 Juno Award for Best Dance Recording.

Toufa has also worked with Fall Out Boy, Will.I.Am, Butch Walker, Mötley Crüe, Tommy Lee and Nelly Furtado.

== Discography ==
Toufa has recorded both as a lead artist and as a featured artist:

=== As lead artist ===
Year	Title	Featured Artists	Album
2011
2011	"Broken Souvenirs"	Millions Like Us	Locked & Loaded: Part 1
2011	"Joyride"	Millions Like Us & Foreign Beggars	Locked & Loaded: Part 1
2011	"Bring Out The Devil"	Skrillex & Kill The Noise	Locked & Loaded: Part 2
2011	"Again Sometime?"	Noisia	Locked & Loaded: Part 2
2013	"B*tch"	Tommy Lee	Non-album single
2014	"Middlefingah"	Nick Thayer & Tommy Lee	Non-album single

=== As featured artist ===
Year	Title	Lead Artist	Album
2010
2010	"Sofi Needs A Ladder"	Deadmau5	4×4=12
2010	"One Trick Pony"	Deadmau5	4×4=12
2010	"2 Ways"	Methods Of Mayhem	A Public Disservice Announcement
2010	"All I Wanna Do"	Methods Of Mayhem	A Public Disservice Announcement
2011	"Beat Of The Drum"	Moguai	Non-album single
2012	"Under My Skin (DIY)"	Savoy	Non-album single
2013	"The Rules"	Tommy Lee & DJ Aero	#MSND
2022	Show N Tell	EDDIE	Killerbite
2023	DROP 'EM	QUIX	Non-album single
2024	Digital Friends	No Mana	I Contain Flashing Images
2025	Whiplash	Crankdat	Non-album single
