= Sofi Needs a Ladder =

Single by Deadmau5 featuring SOFI

from the album 4×4=12
- Released: November 1, 2010
- Recorded: 2010
- Genre: Electro house; hip house
- Length: 6:41
- Label: Ultra; Virgin
- Songwriters: Joel Zimmerman; Sofia Toufa
- Producer: Deadmau5

Deadmau5 singles chronology
"Animal Rights" (2010)	"Sofi Needs a Ladder" (2010)	"Raise Your Weapon" (2011)

"Sofi Needs a Ladder" is a song by Canadian electronic music producer Deadmau5, featuring vocals from Greek singer SOFI. It was released as the third single from deadmau5's fifth studio album, 4×4=12.

== Background ==
The song was originally an instrumental track, "You Need a Ladder", which Deadmau5 previously performed, but vocals were added on afterward to allow the song to be published and avoid any copyright infringement (the song previously included an intro and outro featuring a slightly remixed version of "Overworld theme" from the NES game The Legend of Zelda). The song was first played on the radio by Annie Mac on BBC Radio 1 on October 22, 2010. The song won a 2011 Juno Award for Best Dance Recording.

== In popular culture ==
The single is featured on the soundtrack to the video game Need for Speed: Hot Pursuit. A remix of the song was featured as downloadable content in the video game DJ Hero 2. During the finals of the seventh series of British show The X Factor, contestant Cher Lloyd performed a variation of the first verse of the song mashed up into "What a Feeling". "Sofi Needs a Ladder" is also played in the background during a club scene in the film The Hangover Part II, and was featured in a 2011 Virgin Mobile commercial. Sofi Needs a Ladder is also featured in the hit series Entourage during the season 8 house party for Vinnie Chase.

== Track listing ==
Digital download
No.	Title	Length
1.	"Sofi Needs a Ladder"	6:41

Digital download - Pig & Dan Remix
No.	Title	Length
1.	"Sofi Needs a Ladder" (Pig & Dan Remix)	7:41

Digital download - MosDam Remix
No.	Title	Length
1.	"Sofi Needs a Ladder" (MosDam Remix) (Deadmau5 Ultimate Remix Challenge Winner)	9:12

== Charts ==
Chart (2010)	Peak position
Canada Hot 100 (Billboard)	73
UK Dance (OCC)	10
UK Singles (OCC)	68
