= Deadmau5 =

Canadian music producer and DJ (born 1981)

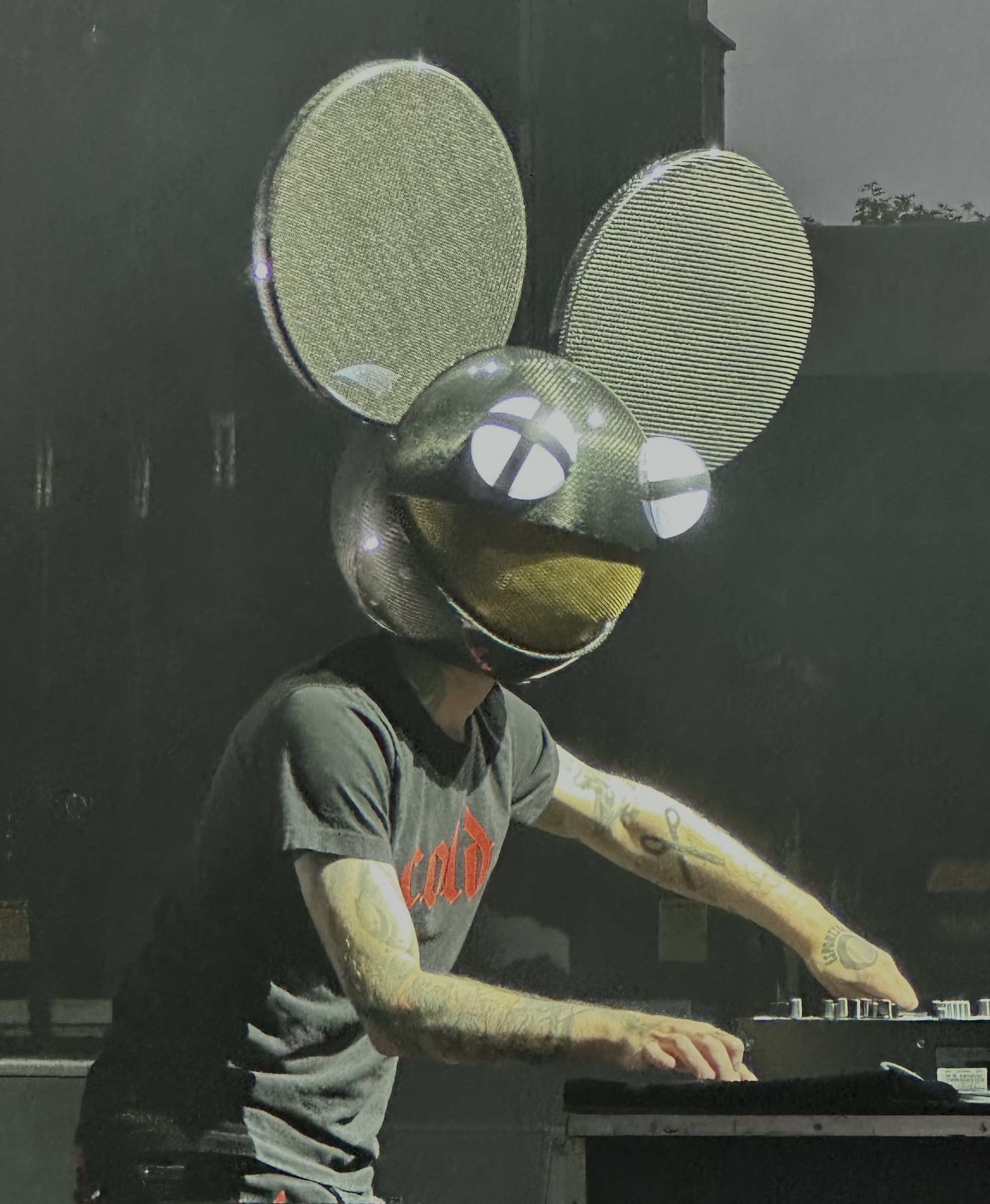
- Deadmau5 performing at Belknap Park of Grand Rapids, Michigan, in 2023

Background information
- Also known as: Halcyon441; Karma K; Testpilot
- Born: Joel Thomas Zimmerman; January 5, 1981 (age 45); Niagara Falls, Ontario, Canada
- Genres: Progressive house; electro house; electronic
- Occupations: Record producer; DJ; Live streamer; Developer
- Instruments: Synthesizer, Digital audio workstation
- Works: Discography
- Years active: 1998–present
- Labels: Mau5trap; Virgin EMI; Ultra; Astralwerks; Ministry of Sound; SongBird; Play; Virgin; Parlophone
- Member of: Kx5; Rezzmau5
- Spouse: Kelly Fedoni (m. 2017; sep. 2021)
- Website: deadmau5.com

Joel Thomas Zimmerman (born January 5, 1981), known professionally as Deadmau5, (Note: Pronounced "dead-mouse", and stylized in all lowercase.) is a Canadian electronic music producer and DJ. His musical style primarily includes progressive house and electro house, though he also produces and DJs other electronic music genres, including techno under the alias Testpilot. Zimmerman mostly appears and performs with a custom helmet called the "mau5head". He has received seven Grammy Award nominations and won four Juno Awards for his songs.

Zimmerman has collaborated with other artists, such as Wolfgang Gartner, Rob Swire, and Chris Lake. He collaborated with Steve Duda to form the duo BSOD and later joined Tommy Lee, DJ Aero, and Duda in the electronic band WTF?. In 2007, he founded his own record label, Mau5trap. Zimmerman later formed electronic music supergroups such as Kx5 with Kaskade and Rezzmau5 with Rezz.

Zimmerman first gained recognition for his breakthrough album Random Album Title (2008), which was certified gold in Canada and silver in the United Kingdom. The album included the single "Faxing Berlin" and the moderate chart hit "I Remember", a collaboration with Kaskade. He won a Juno Award for both this album and the song "All U Ever Want" with Billy Newton-Davis. His fourth studio album, For Lack of a Better Name (2009), was positively received by critics, featuring "Ghosts 'n' Stuff" with Rob Swire of Pendulum, "Hi Friend" featuring MC Flipside, and the single "Strobe". The album earned Zimmerman another Juno award. He released his fifth studio album, 4×4=12 (2010), which was supported by singles "Some Chords", "Animal Rights" with Wolfgang Gartner, "Sofi Needs a Ladder" with the singer Sofi, and "Raise Your Weapon" featuring Greta Svabo Bech.

Zimmerman's sixth studio album, Album Title Goes Here (2012), featured the singles "The Veldt" featuring Chris James, and "Professional Griefers" with Gerard Way of My Chemical Romance. The album was a commercial success. Following his departure from long-time label Ultra Records, Zimmerman released his seventh studio album, While(1<2) (2014), supported by its singles "Avaritia", and "Seeya" featuring Colleen D'Agostino of The Material. After a brief hiatus, Zimmerman released his eighth studio album, W:/2016Album/ (2016), with singles "Snowcone", and "Let Go" featuring Grabbitz. He subsequently composed the film score for Polar (2019), and released "Pomegranate" with the Neptunes and "Bridged by a Lightwave" featuring Kiesza in 2020. Zimmerman's next album is slated for release in 2026, the second single of which is "Science" featuring Stevie Appleton.

== Early life ==
Zimmerman was born on January 5, 1981 in Niagara Falls, Ontario, Canada. His mother, Nancy (née Johnson), is a visual artist, and his father, Rodney Thomas "Rod" Zimmerman, is a General Motors plant worker. He has two siblings, Jennifer (older) and Chris (younger). His ancestry includes German, Swiss, and English heritage. Zimmerman went to Westlane Secondary School in Niagara Falls.

Zimmerman's interest in technology began at a young age; he would disassemble and reassemble several household electronics, and later, he received his first computer. Inspired by his interest in video games, Zimmerman started making chiptune music. When Zimmerman was a teenager, he also started going to raves.

The name "Deadmau5" originates from an incident with his computer: when it began to smell, Zimmerman dismantled it and found a dead mouse inside. Zimmerman then became known as the "dead mouse guy" among friends, and tried to change his name to "Deadmouse" in an online chat room. The name was one character too long, so he shortened it to "Deadmau5". "Maus" is the German word for "mouse" and is pronounced the same as in English; the ending character 5 instead of an 's' is a form of leetspeak.

== Career ==
=== 1998–2006: Career beginnings ===
Zimmerman's music career began in the late 1990s, heavily influenced by chiptune music and demoscene, producing his early work with the program Impulse Tracker. He briefly worked with an online music licensing company and was a programmer. Around 2000, while learning how to use 3D modelling software, Zimmerman created the "mau5head". The logo since has since appeared in many different colors and designs, and is included on the cover art of Zimmerman's albums.

In 2000, Zimmerman and Derek Caesar, under the group name Dred and Karma, released the vinyl singles "I Don't Want No Other" and "Suck This". Zimmerman was hosting a radio show in Niagara Falls, and often stayed at a local record shop's recording studio making music. Zimmerman began uploading songs to SectionZ and producing under the alias "Deadmau5" in 2002. On July 26, 2005, Zimmerman released his debut studio album, titled Get Scraped. Around the same time, Zimmerman teamed up with producer Steve Duda to form the electro house duo BSOD. Their single "This Is The Hook" was released in 2006 and topped the Beatport Top 100 chart. The duo would go on to release music spontaneously, most recently on April 10, 2020 with the EP No Way, Get Real.

In 2006, Zimmerman signed to Play Records and would release various collaborations with Melleefresh. Zimmerman also self-released two compilation albums, first releasing Deadmau5 Circa 1998–2002, which consisted of older tracks, and later, A Little Oblique, which contained new songs.

=== 2006–2008: Breakthrough with Random Album Title ===
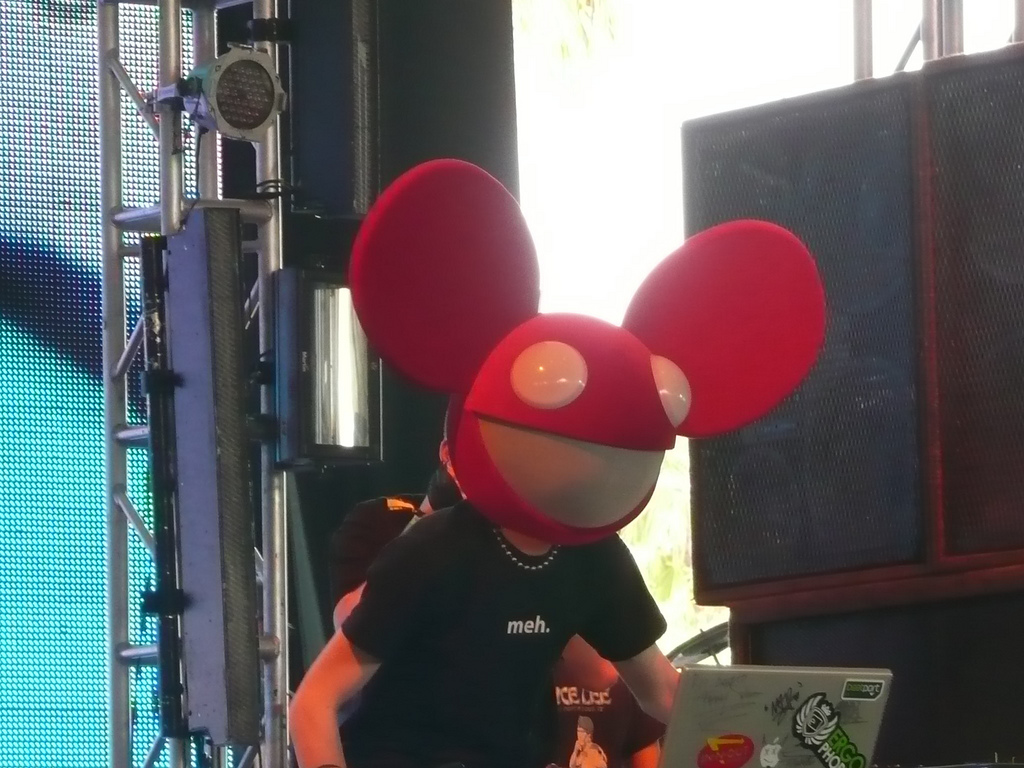
Deadmau5 at Coachella 2008

In 2006, Zimmerman released his second studio album, Vexillology, on November 6, 2006, also through Play Records. In 2007, Zimmerman founded his own record label, Mau5trap, which, along with Ultra Records and Ministry of Sound first released the single Faxing Berlin. Zimmerman was given the idea to wear a helmet based on the "mau5head" by one of his friends, Jay Gordon of the industrial metal band Orgy. He wore the helmet for the first time in 2008. Project 56, a compilation album of earlier music, also officially released in 2008. That same year, Zimmerman and Play Records parted ways, with Play Records retaining ownership of Zimmerman's earlier releases. In 2008, Zimmerman joined the electronic band WTF?, which includes the members Tommy Lee, DJ Aero, and again Steve Duda. The band only has four tracks and rarely performs.

In 2008, the album Random Album Title was released. It included Not Exactly, Faxing Berlin, and saw the first collaboration of Zimmerman and Chicago producer Kaskade with "I Remember". "I Remember" became the most popular song on the album, and Rolling Stone later listed it as one of the 200 greatest dance songs of all time. Random Album Title was certified gold in Canada, and it received a Juno Award. Also in 2008, Zimmerman's song with singer Billy Newton-Davis "All U Ever Want" won a Juno Award.

Zimmerman again collaborated with Kaskade in 2008, and in the United States, the song "Move for Me" reached number one on Billboard magazine's Dance/Mix Show Airplay chart in its September 6, 2008 issue. In 2008, Zimmerman received his first Grammy nomination for Best Remixed Recording on "The Longest Road (Deadmau5 Remix)", a remix of a song by DJ and producer Morgan Page.

=== 2009–2011: For Lack of a Better Name and 4×4=12 ===
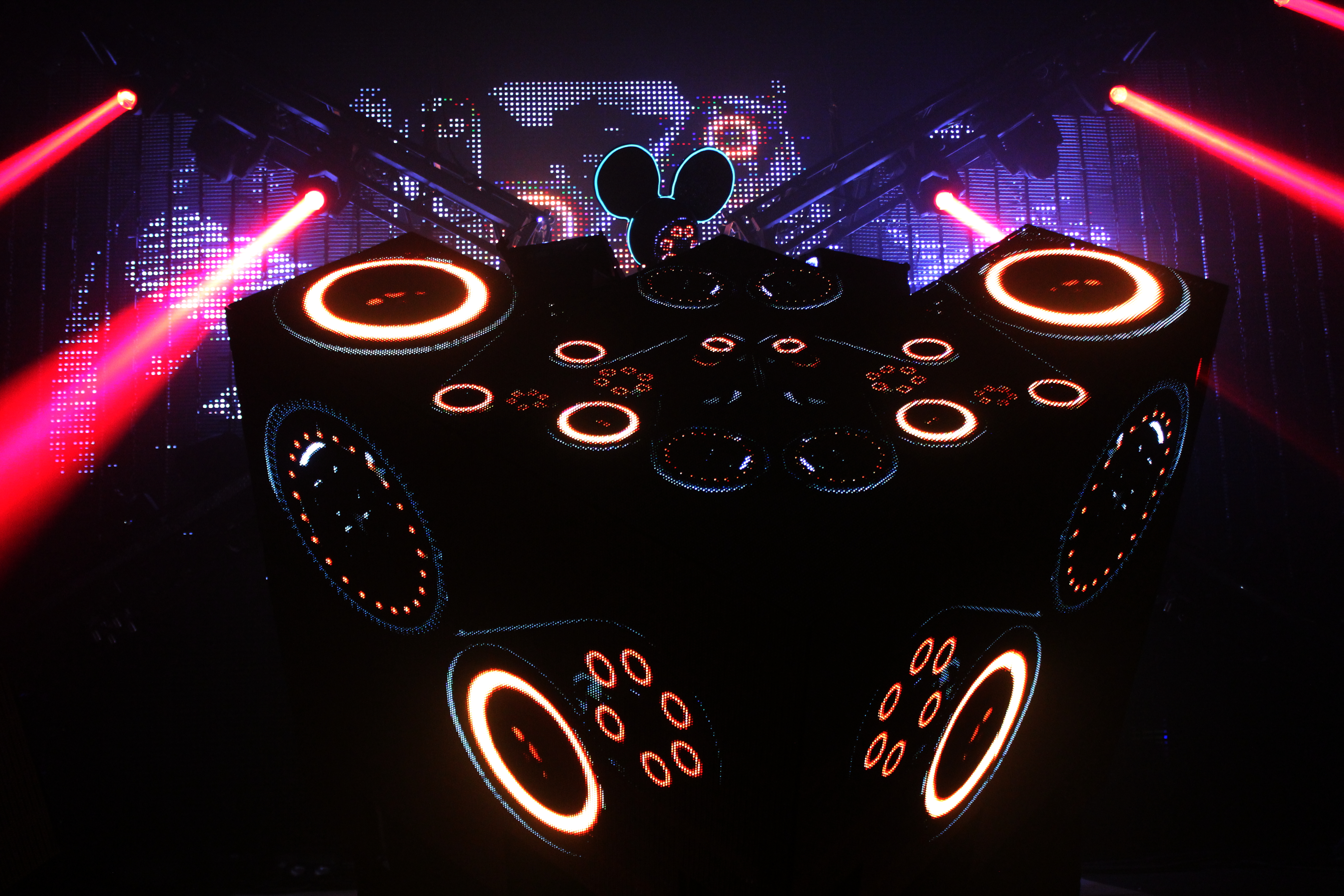
Deadmau5 performing with the Cube at the Austin Music Hall, 2011

On September 22, 2009, Ultra Records released Zimmerman's album For Lack of a Better Name. "Ghosts 'n' Stuff", featuring vocals from Rob Swire of Pendulum, reached number one on Billboard's Dance/Mix Show Airplay chart, becoming one of their most popular songs. Despite being reluctant to release the track, "Strobe" was praised by critics and fans, and In 2017, Billboard Dance listed "Strobe" as Zimmerman's best song of all time on their list of the artist's 20 best tracks. For Lack of A Better Name went on to win a Juno Award in 2010.

In April 2010, Zimmerman unveiled his "Cube" stage at Coachella. MTV named Zimmerman as the house DJ for the 2010 MTV Video Music Awards and MTV PUSH artist of the week on August 16, 2010. He expressed gratitude towards Lady Gaga and David Guetta for bringing dance into the pop music scene and paving the way for him to the mainstream. At the awards, Zimmerman performed with Jason Derulo and Travie McCoy.

His fifth studio album, 4×4=12, was released on December 7, 2010. The singles "Some Chords", "Animal Rights" with the DJ and producer Wolfgang Gartner, "Raise Your Weapon" with the musician Greta Svabo Bech and "Sofi Needs a Ladder" with the singer Sofi were released and featured on the album, with the aforementioned single "Sofi Needs A Ladder" winning a Juno Award. 4×4=12 also received a nomination at the 54th Grammy Awards for Best Dance/Electronica Album, along with "Raise Your Weapon" for best Dance Recording The song "Some Chords" was later featured on an episode of CSI: Crime Scene Investigation where Zimmerman made a cameo appearance, and an instrumental version of "Sofi Needs a Ladder" was featured in the film The Hangover Part II. That same year, Zimmerman also released two non-album singles—"Aural Psynapse" and "HR 8938 Cephei"—and was nominated for his third Grammy for a remix of the song "Rope" by Foo Fighters.

=== 2012–2014: Album Title Goes Here and While(1<2) ===
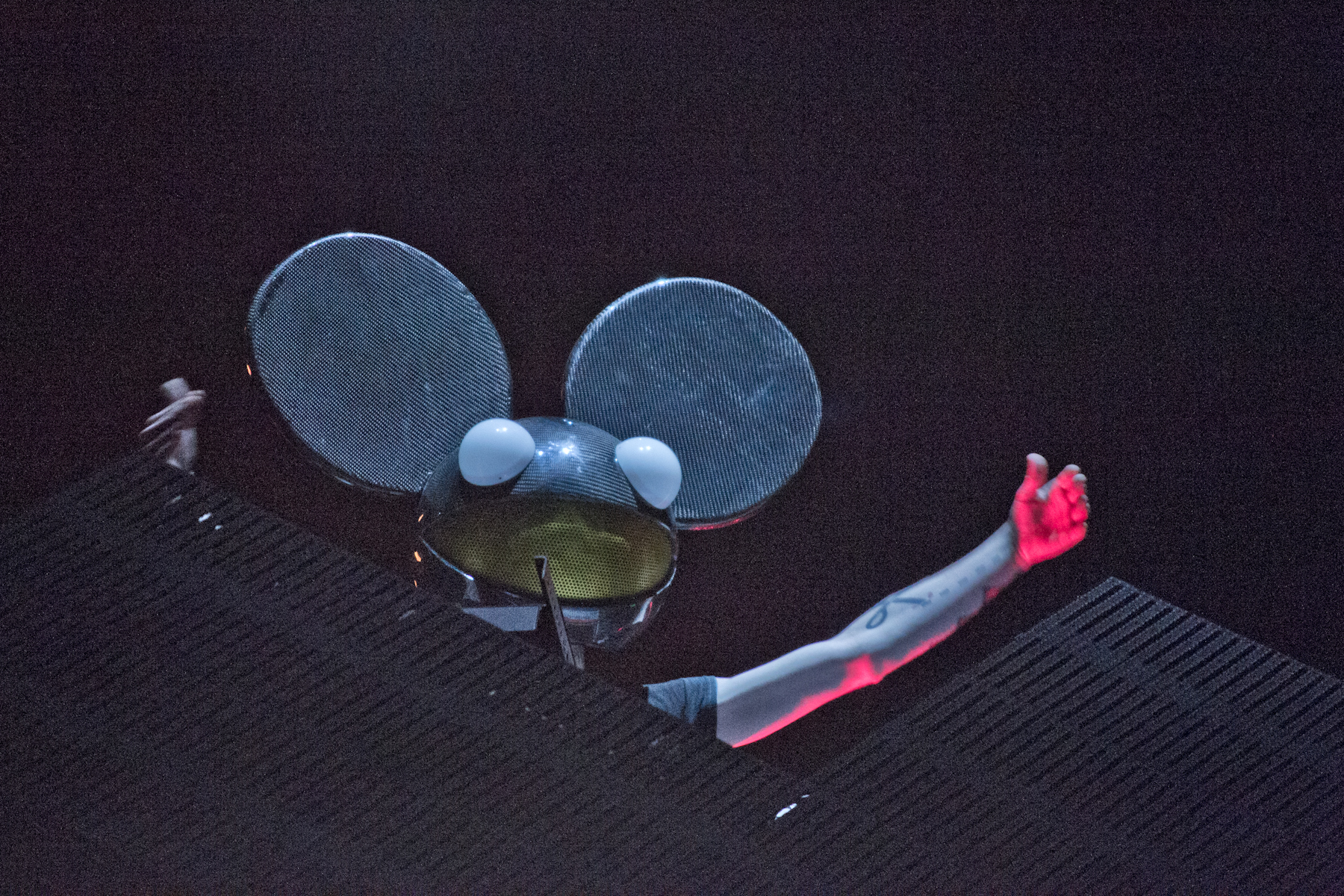
Deadmau5 performing at Rock in Rio with the Cube in Madrid, 2012

In February 2012, at the 54th Annual Grammy Awards, Zimmerman attended the ceremony with three separate nominations. At the ceremony, Zimmerman secretly changed his shirt to another with the fellow electronic act Skrillex's number on it, "trolling" him.

His sixth studio album, Album Title Goes Here, was released on September 24, 2012. Singles from this album include "Maths", "The Veldt" with singer Chris James, "Professional Griefers" with Gerard Way of My Chemical Romance, "Channel 42" with Wolfgang Gartner, and "Telemiscommunications" with Imogen Heap. FUSE TV named "Professional Griefers" one of the top 40 songs of 2012, and Rolling Stone named "The Veldt" one of the 50 best songs of 2012. Album Title Goes Here was nominated for Best Dance/Electronica Album at the 55th Grammy Awards.

In November 2013, Zimmerman deleted three years' worth of music from his SoundCloud account, replacing them with an EP of seven melancholy piano sonatas, simply called 7, named after the Latin translations for the seven deadly sins: "Acedia", "Avaritia", "Gula", "Invidia", "Ira", "Luxuria", and "Superbia". The same month, Zimmerman left longtime label Ultra Records and signed with record label Astralwerks, a famed NYC-based imprint that houses artists such as Swedish House Mafia, David Guetta, and The Chemical Brothers.

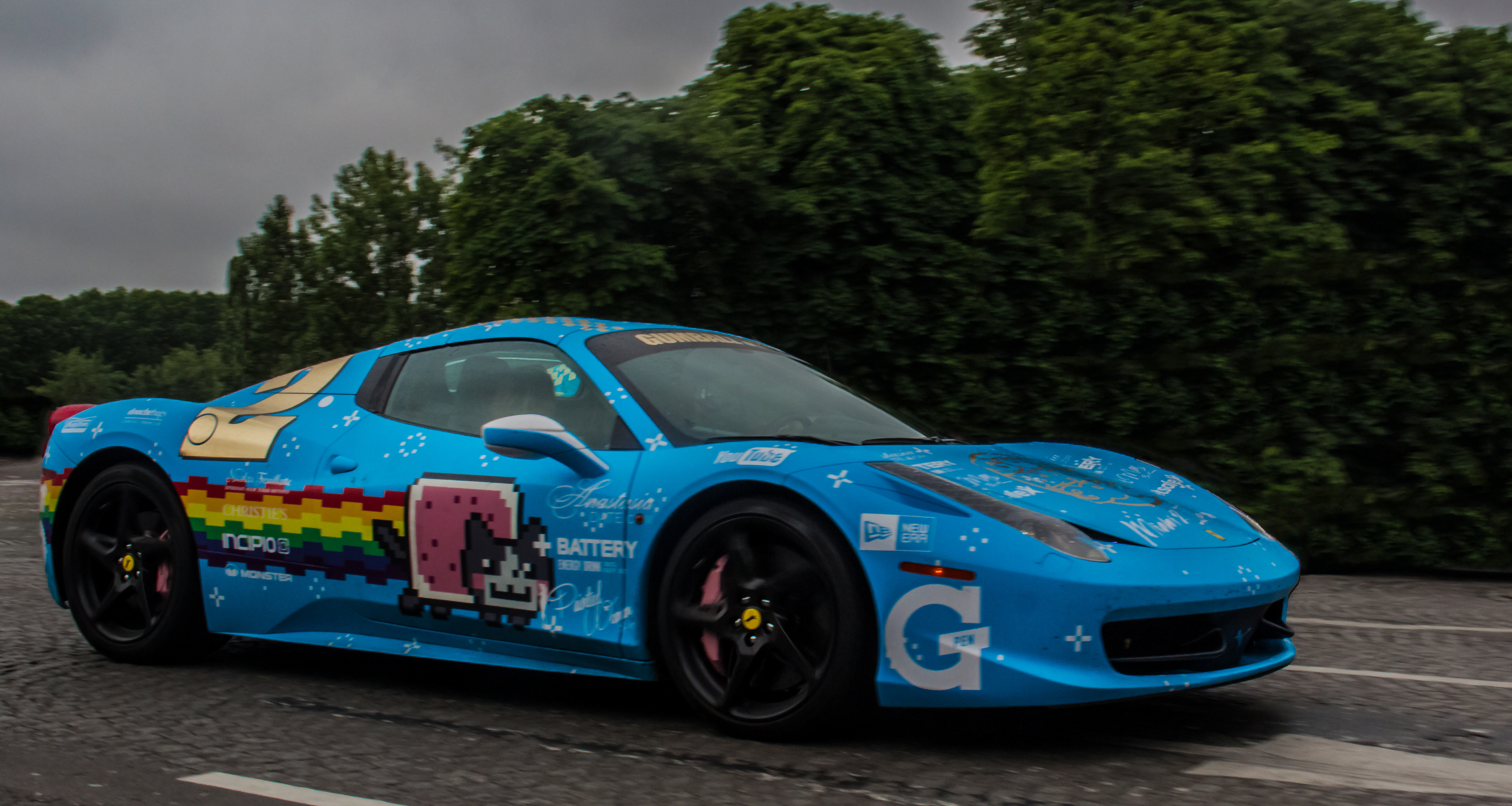
Zimmerman's customized Ferrari 458 at the 2014 Gumball 3000

In March 2014, Zimmerman officially launched his techno alias 'Testpilot', releasing "Sunspot (White Space Conflict)". Later that year, Zimmerman announced via his Twitter account that his seventh studio album was complete. "In other news... I finished my album today," the tweet read. "2 discs. 2 continuous mixes. 25 tracks. and something I'm proud of." On June 17, 2014, the album While(1<2) was released through Astralwerks and Virgin EMI. While(1<2) was released with four singles; "Avaritia", "Seeya", with singer Colleen D'Agostino from the band the Material, "Infra Turbo Pigcart Racer", and "Phantoms Can't Hang". While(1<2) also received a Grammy nomination for Best Dance/Electronic Album at the 57th Annual Grammy Awards. In 2014, Zimmerman was sent a cease and desist letter by Ferrari regarding his highly customised 458 Italia: the car, which he dubbed the "Purrari", possessed custom badges and a Nyan Cat-themed wrap, and was later put up for sale on Craigslist.

=== 2015–2016: Hiatus and W:/2016Album/ ===
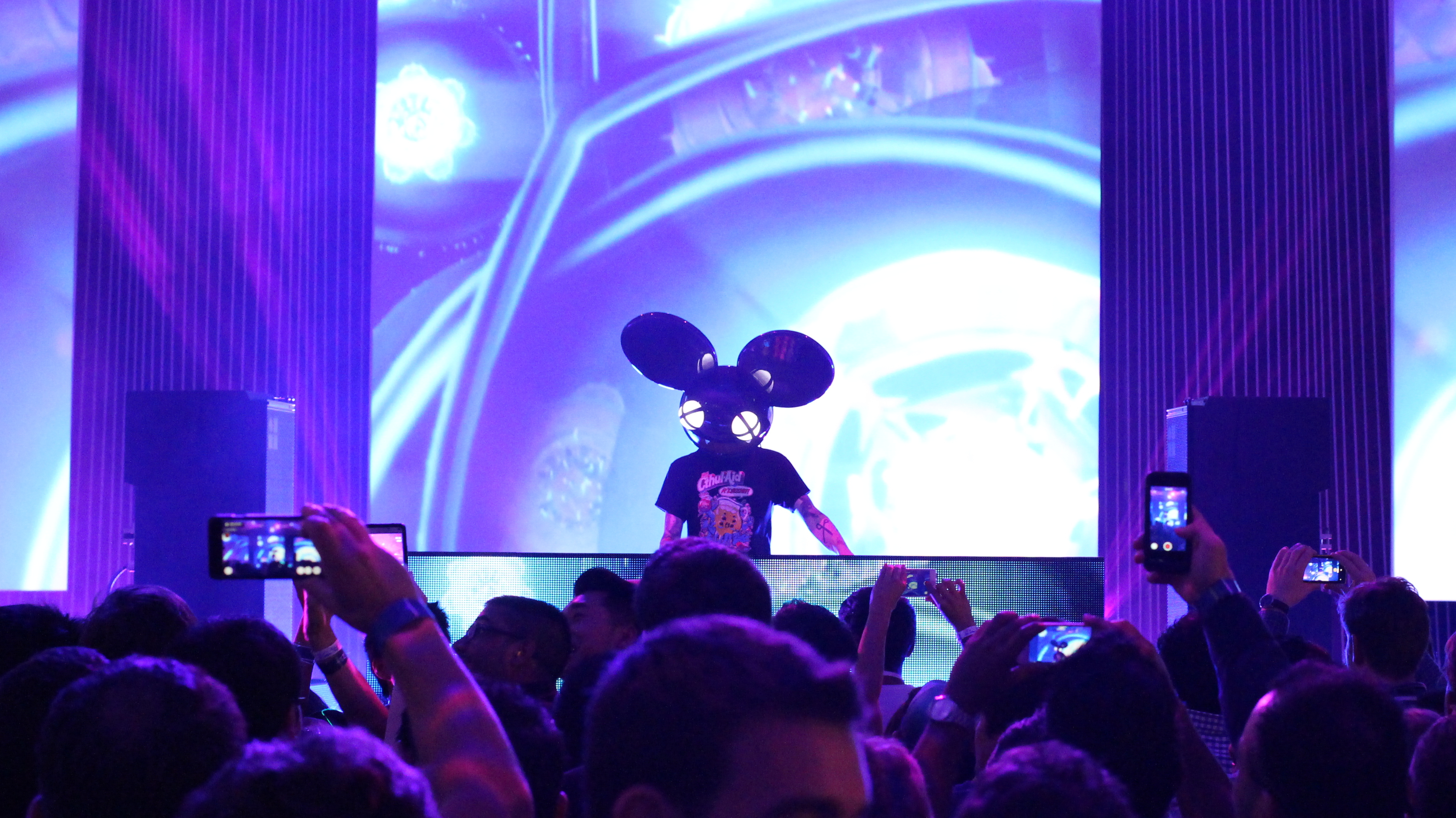
Deadmau5 performing at Facebook F8 2015 in San Francisco, California

On July 23, 2015, Valve announced that Deadmau5 was creating a series of sound clips to be featured in their video game Dota 2. The music pack was released alongside the announcement. On August 8, 2015, Deadmau5 performed live at KeyArena in Seattle at the conclusion of the Dota 2 competition The International 5 (TI5). On October 7, 2015, Deadmau5 officially announced that he was leaving Astralwerks and going entirely independent with his own label, Mau5trap.

On December 17, 2015, it appeared that Zimmerman was taking a leave of absence after deleting several of his accounts. On December 21, 2015, Zimmerman reopened his Twitter account and posted an apology to his Tumblr account explaining his disappearance from social media, saying that he was suffering from depression and would be returning to producing music after the new year.

On October 7, 2016, "Beneath with Me", a collaboration with Skylar Grey and Kaskade, was released. On May 27, 2016, "Snowcone" was released, later revealed to be the first single from his next album. On November 4, 2016, Zimmerman announced his next studio album, W:/2016Album/, which was released on December 2, 2016 with another single "Let Go" featuring Grabbitz

=== 2017–2019: Where's the Drop?, Polar soundtrack, and Mau5ville ===
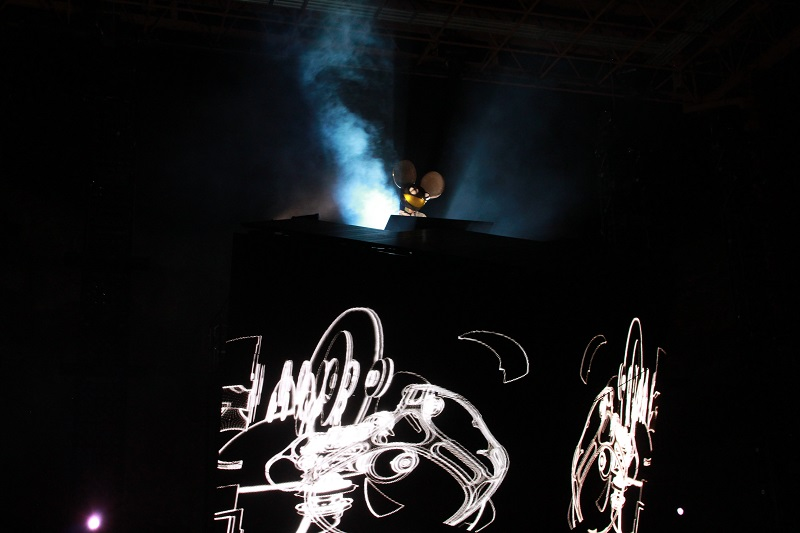
Deadmau5 performing at Red Rocks Amphitheatre with the Cube in 2017

On January 7, 2017, Zimmerman announced a compilation of his earlier work, ranging from 1998 to 2007, on Twitter, titled Stuff I Used to Do. Zimmerman also stated that the compilation would be released in February of that year. On February 24, 2017, Zimmerman released a limited version of Stuff I Used to Do on WeTransfer. The edition, available until March 3, featured three fewer tracks than the full album. The album includes tracks from Get Scraped and early compilations, in addition to an alternative mix of "Creep" from While(1<2). The album was officially released on Mau5trap a week later, on March 3, 2017. On August 25, 2017, Zimmerman released a stand-alone single entitled "Legendary", featuring vocals from rapper Shotty Horroh.

In March 2018, Zimmerman announced a compilation album with Gregory Reveret comprising live orchestral performances of previously released music, titled Where's the Drop?. On March 30, 2018, the album was initially released exclusively on the music streaming service Tidal for a period of three months, and on June 29, 2018, the album was officially released to other platforms. On July 3, 2018, Zimmerman announced an EP and compilation album titled Mau5ville: Level 1, featuring "Monophobia" (his second collaboration with Rob Swire), as well as tracks from Getter and GTA. It was released on July 13, 2018 through Mau5trap. On September 18, 2018, Zimmerman announced that he was in the process of producing his first ever original film score for the Netflix film Polar directed by Jonas Åkerlund. In October 2018, the track listing of a follow-up EP, Mau5ville: Level 2, was leaked, showing featured collaborations with Lights and Mr. Bill, with no release date confirmed at the time. The EP was released officially on November 16, 2018, through Mau5trap.

On January 25, 2019, Polar (2019) premiered on Netflix, with Zimmerman releasing the soundtrack album, Polar (Music from the Netflix Film), through Mau5trap. On February 1, 2019, the third installment in the Mau5ville series, Mau5ville: Level 3 was released through Mau5trap. The compilation EP featured collaborations with Shotty Horroh, Scene of Action as well as tracks from No Mana and C.O.Z. In November 2019, Zimmerman released three new singles, entitled "Satrn", "Coasted" and "Fall", released on the 16th, 22nd and 29th, respectively.

=== 2020–2024: Kx5 and Some EP ===
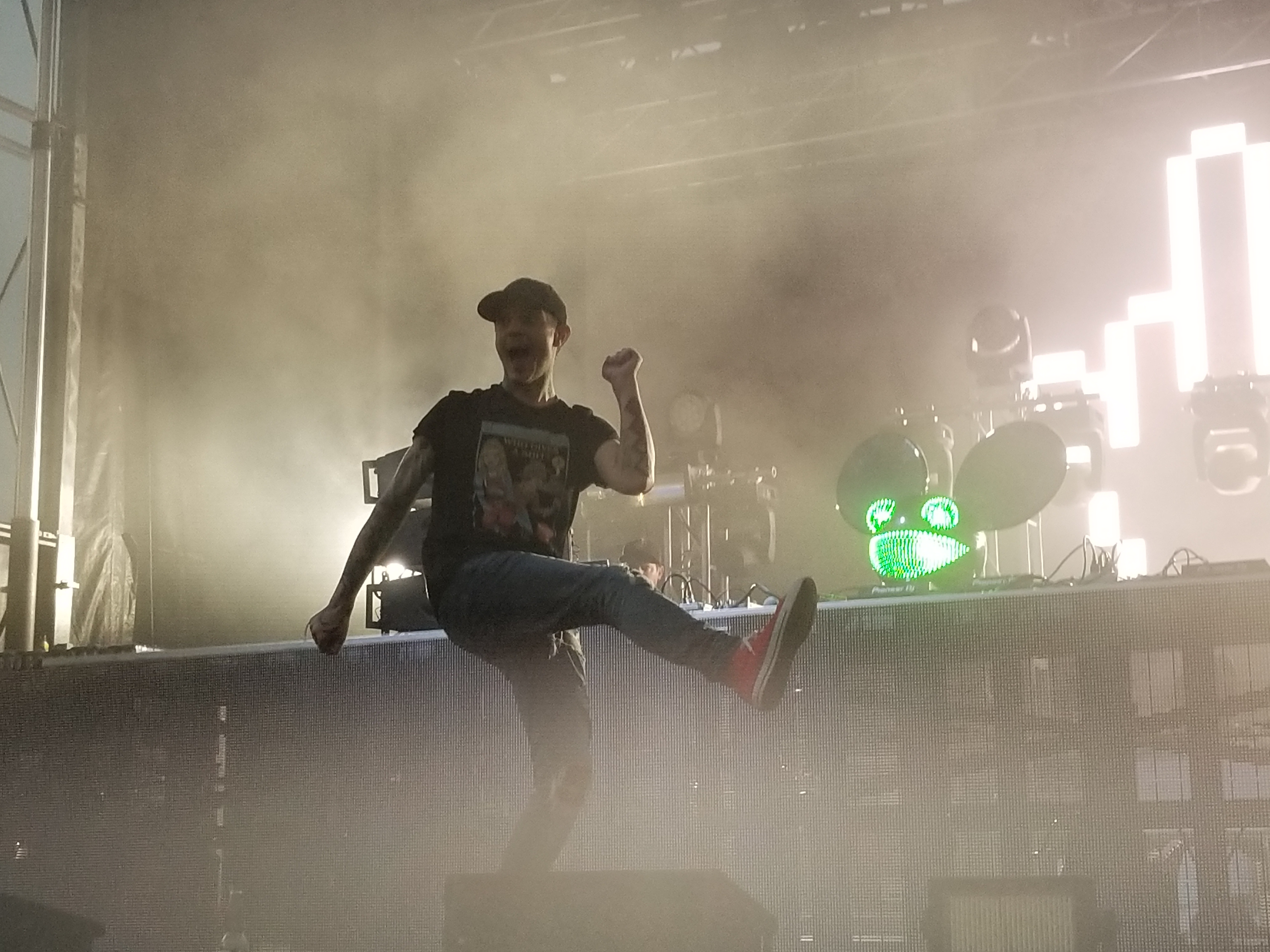
Zimmerman performing at The Crofoot in Pontiac, Michigan in 2021

On May 20, 2020, Zimmerman released the single "Pomegranate", featuring production duo the Neptunes. In November of that year, he collaborated with Kiesza on the track "Bridged by a Lightwave". On March 29, 2021, Zimmerman released the single "Nextra" on his new "Hau5trap" label. Later that year, Rezz and Zimmerman collaborated to release the single "Hypnocurrency". Deadmau5 and Rezz subsequently performed together, forming the electronic music supergroup Rezzmau5. On July 16, Zimmerman and Lights released the single "When the Summer Dies", and on October 29, 2021, Zimmerman and Foster The People released the single "Hyperlandia".

In 2022, Zimmerman and Kaskade announced a collaboration project named Kx5 (pronounced "kay-five"), marking the fourth time the producers have worked together. The first single from the project, "Escape" featuring Hayla, was released on March 11. On July 15, 2022, "My Heart Has Teeth", another collaboration with Skylar Grey, was featured on the soundtrack for the Netflix series Resident Evil (2022). In December, Kx5 headlined a performance at the Los Angeles Memorial Coliseum. The duo's first album, eponymously titled Kx5, released on March 17, 2023, featuring collaborations with AR/CO, Elderbrook, Sofi, and The Moth & The Flame. Later that year, on October 13, Zimmerman and Rezz again collaborated as Rezzmau5 and released "Infraliminal", a remix of "Superliminal" from Album Title Goes Here.

On March 22, 2024, Zimmerman was honoured at the 2024 Electronic Dance Music Awards with the Legend Award at the Eden Roc Miami Beach Hotel in Miami. On April 27th, 2024, Zimmerman played his first of three "Retro5pective: 25 Years of Deadmau5" shows at the Hollywood Bowl. On May 2, 2024, he performed at the Brooklyn Mirage, and on November 1, 2024, he performed at the Red Rocks Amphitheatre. The tour focused on Zimmerman's discography over the past two decades, featuring performances with mau5heads from earlier in his career, as well as the Cube stage. Steve Duda, Tommy Lee, Meute, Sofi, Kiesza, and Lights were all special guests who appeared in some of the shows.

On June 12, 2024, Zimmerman was inducted into the Canadian Music Hall of Fame. He marked the occasion with a 45-minute fireside chat about his career at the event, reflecting on the start of his career as well as airing light aspirations to perform at the newly opened Las Vegas Sphere. In July 2024, Zimmerman went on to release singles leading up to the release of "Some EP", the most significant of which being "Wet", the first single released under the Testpilot project in a decade. Zimmerman released "Some EP" on July 19, 2024. On November 8, 2024, Zimmerman released another four track EP including the 2007 single 'Jaded'. Later that month, Zimmerman was announced to be signed to Creative Artists Agency to be represented in all fields. In December 2024, Zimmerman released "Familiars" as part of a collaboration with World of Tanks Blitz.

=== 2025–present: Error5 and upcoming 2026 album ===
In January 2025, Zimmerman released "Jupiter" alongside a music video, and collaborated with Irish producer Rebūke, releasing "Endless" with vocals by Ed Graves. On March 4, 2025, Zimmerman's discography, including the Mau5trap catalog, was acquired by Create Music Group. At Coachella 2025 in April, Zimmerman, performing as Testpilot with electronic music producer and singer Zhu, was removed from the stage after slurring his speech and falling over. The next morning, Zimmerman issued an apology on his Instagram account, commenting that it would most likely be his last Coachella. In August 2025, Zimmerman collaborated with Rocket League, Fortnite, and McLaren to introduce Deadmau5 themed cosmetics to both games. The "Error5" EP was released coinciding with the collaboration. On October 24, 2025, Zimmerman began releasing singles for his upcoming 2026 album, first releasing "Ameonna", and on February 20, 2026, "Science", a collaboration with Stevie Appleton.

On February 11th, 2026, Zimmerman posted a statement to social media addressing a deepfake video, stating that he "woke up to some idiot DJ's Instagram story [...] that depicted me standing there promoting him and his music", noting further that the deepfake was fully AI-generated. Zimmerman released statements to Rolling Stone and Billboard Canada endorsing the No Fakes Act, also backed by his lawyer, Dina LaPolt, stating that "we need to be in control of our own faces, voices, music, output [...] protections are necessary now more than ever."

On August 14, 2026, Zimmerman released a remix of Angine de Poitrine's song "Fabienk". On September 10, 2026, it was announced that Zimmerman had signed with Independent Artist Group.

== Artistry ==
=== Musical style ===
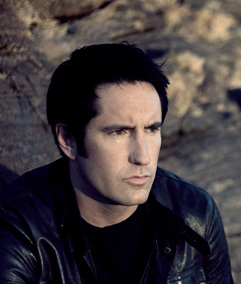
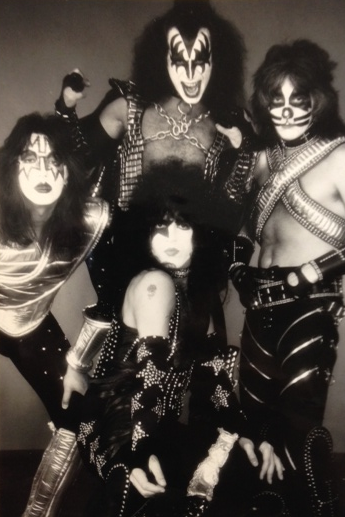
Zimmerman is influenced by acts like Nine Inch Nails and Kiss.

Zimmerman's musical style has been described as progressive house, trance, techno, and electro house. His songs are mostly instrumental, except for sampling and collaborations with singers. His dance tracks like 'Strobe' are characterized by their melodies and long buildups, with other dance tracks like 'Ghosts 'n' Stuff' with Rob Swire featuring vocal collaborations. Most of his songs are also at a tempo of 128 bpm. Zimmerman has used FL Studio and analog synthesizers to make his music.

Zimmerman grew up listening to Tears for Fears, Steely Dan, and later cited Nine Inch Nails, Aphex Twin, and the live performances of Kiss as influences. He was also influenced by chiptune music and demoscene, and in the late 1990s, he began producing his early work with the program Impulse Tracker, a music sequencer released in 1995. Zimmerman is highly influential to electronic dance music, as he continued to refine and evolve progressive house, and he was the first EDM act to appear on a Rolling Stones magazine cover. Zimmerman is also considered one of electronic music's most recognizable acts, paired with his musical style, and 'mau5head' helmet. Zimmerman is also responsible for introducing American DJ and producer Skrillex to the mainstream, releasing his first commercially successful EP, Scary Monsters and Nice Sprites, on Mau5trap. Outside of electronic dance music, Zimmerman produced an orchestral album with Gregory Reveret and Tidal in 2018 called Where's the Drop?, and composed the soundtrack for the action film Polar (2019).

=== Stage design ===
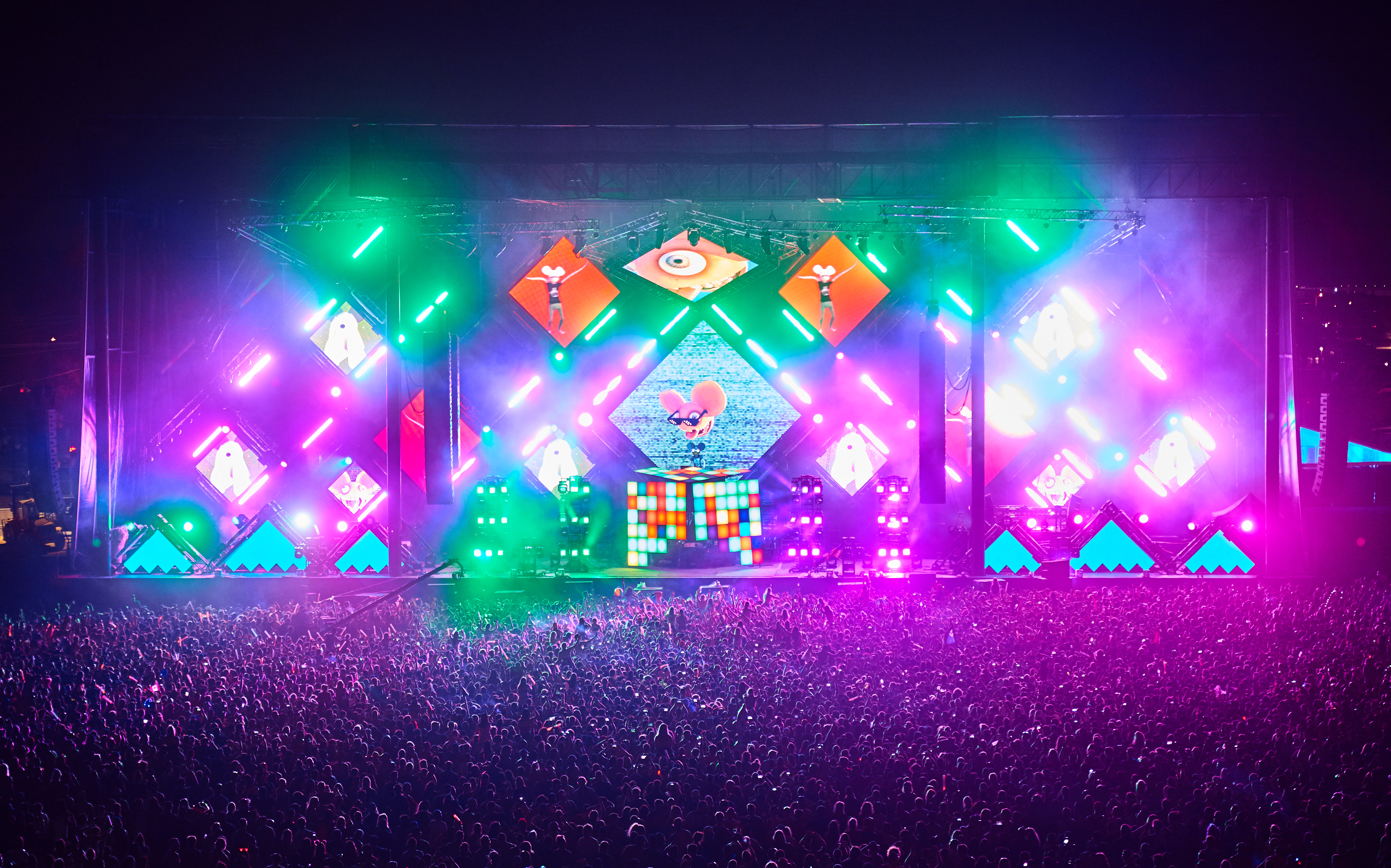
Deadmau5 performing on the Cube stage at VELD Music Festival in 2016

Zimmerman was highly influential in the rise of audio-visual shows, following the performances of Daft Punk with their pyramid stage during their Alive 2007 tour. In April 2010, Zimmerman unveiled his first "Cube" stage at Coachella. The Cube was Zimmerman's stage setup primarily featured on tours. The Cube and its following iterations were large half-cube shaped LED screens accompanied with extensive surrounding lighting and pyrotechnics. On March 25, 2017, Zimmerman began a concert tour with the "Cube 2.1" stage set, a larger version of the Cube. The tour, entitled Lots of Shows in a Row, toured North America and Europe to promote the release of W:/2016Album/. The final iteration of the Cube, called the "Cube V3", was able to rotate a full 360 degrees and tilt. The stage design included over 600 LED panels and weighed 260 tons, requiring a large team to transport and custom technology to operate. Zimmerman retired the Cube stage design in 2025. The Jim Henson Creature Shop designs and fabricates Zimmerman's mau5heads.

== Reception ==
Deadmau5 is regarded as one of the original EDM acts to achieve commercial success in the United States. Zimmerman's 'mau5head' helmets are considered iconic, and he is known for posting and interacting with fans online as well as feuding with various artists.

Alexis Petridis of The Guardian described Zimmerman's music as "derivative" and "cliched", but lamented that "it's extremely well produced (and) punchy ... the sound of a man who knows his market." Mike Diver of BBC also stated that Zimmerman's music "does well to not run out of steam". In 2008, Deadmau5 was voted the 11th-greatest DJ in a worldwide poll by DJ Mag.

Canadian DJ Rezz named Zimmerman as a significant influence in her work. In an interview with Vice, she stated that a main moment in her early production work was when she "immediately jumped onto Ableton" after viewing a Deadmau5 livestream." American DJ Skrillex, who had his debut album, Scary Monsters and Nice Sprites, released on Mau5trap, stated that "I'll always have love for Joel because he put me on at an early time, but he's an asshole ... and that's kinda his thing".

== Video game appearances ==
Zimmerman is a playable avatar in the 2010 video game DJ Hero 2. The game featured several tracks by the artist, including a mix of "Ghosts 'n' Stuff" with Lady Gaga's "Just Dance". His music has been included in other video game titles, including a custom soundtrack for Dota 2 and in the 2020 video game Fuser with "Ghosts 'n' Stuff" featured as a mixable song. In the mobile app Family Guy: The Quest for Stuff by TinyCo, Deadmau5 was available for purchase as a playable character during the "PeterPalooza". Virtual versions of his helmet were also an available accessory as a topper and antenna in Rocket League.

On May 8, 2020, in Fortnite, a multi-part virtual concert by Dillon Francis, Steve Aoki, and Deadmau5 himself was held to celebrate the full release of the "Party Royale" game mode. In November 2024, Zimmerman collaborated with the mobile game World of Tanks Blitz, introducing Deadmau5-themed tanks, quests, and releasing the track "Familiars" through the game. The next year, Zimmerman and Oberhasli Studios released the video game "Meowingtons Simulator". The game centers on controlling Zimmerman's late cat Meowingtons with ragdoll physics synced to music. In August 2025, Zimmerman again collaborated with Rocket League and Fortnite, introducing a Deadmau5 themed McLaren sports car within both games, and his own outfit in Fortnite Battle Royale. The "Error5" EP released coinciding with the collaborations.

== Personal life ==
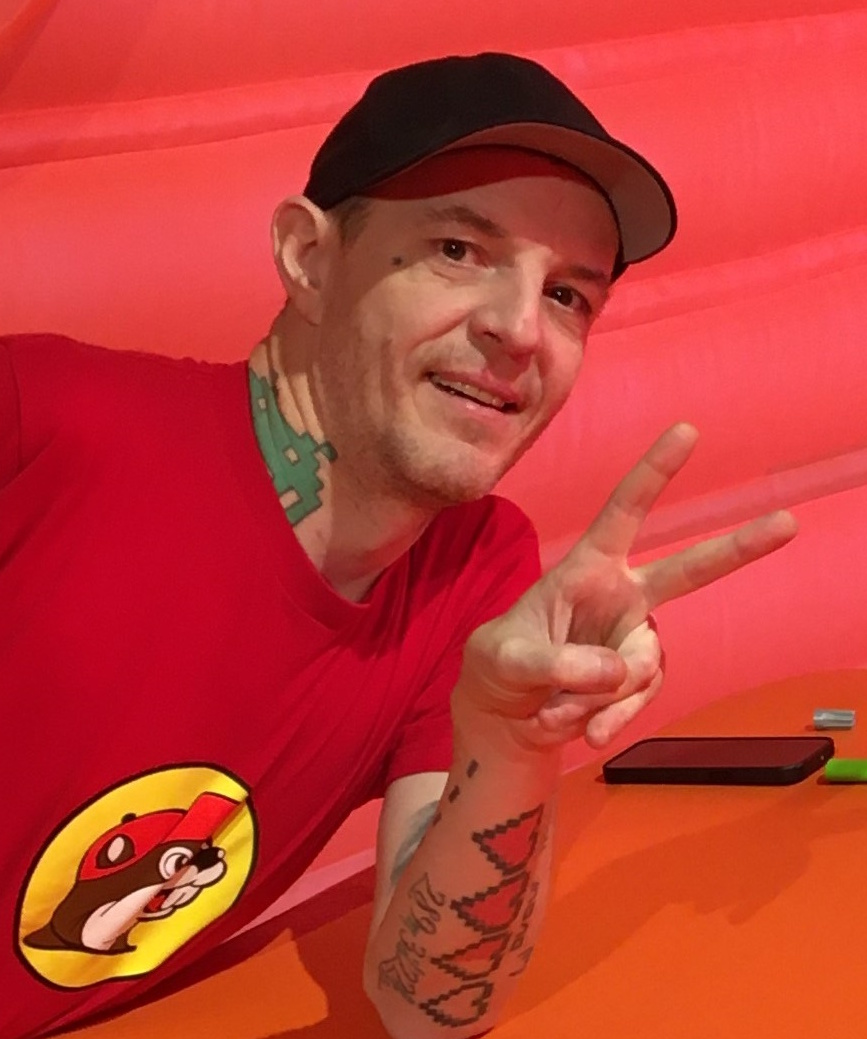
Zimmerman unmasked in 2023

In September 2012, Zimmerman began dating American tattoo artist and TV personality Kat Von D, but after breaking up in November 2012, they rekindled their relationship shortly afterwards. On December 15, 2012, Zimmerman proposed to Von D via Twitter, announcing that they would marry in August 2013. Zimmerman moved to Los Angeles to live with Von D. In June 2013, Von D announced that they had ended their engagement. On August 12, 2017, Zimmerman married Kelly Fedoni. By June 2021, he and Fedoni had separated and would divorce, but stated that their relationship had ended amicably.

In 2014, Zimmerman purchased a $5 million home in the Campbellville area of Milton, Ontario. Zimmerman also owns a small farm in Ontario and takes care of several animals. He currently has several cats adopted from Animal Adoptions of Flamborough, also in Ontario. Zimmerman frequently collaborates with the Toronto based restaurant chain Tim Hortons, and in a collaboration with their Smile Cookie program, raised $7.8 million dollars for charity. In addition, Zimmerman runs a series called "Coffee Run", and the show centers on Zimmerman casually chatting with guest producers while getting Tim Horton's coffee.

== Controversies ==
In October 2018, Zimmerman posted comments on Twitter during an argument including the statements "I'll bet you suck a guy off for 40 grand, zero fucking questions asked" and "women don't posses [sic] penises". These comments were construed by readers as being homophobic and transphobic. Zimmerman apologized for his comments, saying that he "wasn't trying to make blatant transphobic statements", and had "just got into a heated argument with some dude online", noting that his comments had been taken "somewhere unintended". A few days later, during a gaming stream, he referred to a track by fellow electronic artist Slushii as "AIDS fucking music" and "autistic shit". Slushii—who is on the autism spectrum—responded to these comments on Twitter, calling them "really disappointing". Zimmerman later apologized for his comments, citing mental health issues that required "professional help", and stating that he would take time "off the radar" to "work on [himself]".

In February 2019, while playing PlayerUnknown's Battlegrounds on a livestream on Twitch, Zimmerman called another player a "fucking cock-sucking stream sniper fag." Twitch suspended Zimmerman from their platform for hate speech, after which he posted: "I know who I am, and I don't have to fucking sit here and cry and defend my fucking self with the obligatory 'I'm not that person, I am sorry' reflex," vowing to never work with the company again. Zimmerman later apologized for his remarks in a Reddit post, and was subsequently reinstated.

In January 2025, American DJ and electronic dance music producer 3lau performed at Donald Trump's second Inaugural Ball. In the Instagram post celebrating this, many artists heavily criticized the performance, with the most high-profile comments being from Zimmerman himself, commenting that "[...] everyone in this business will remember that you stood behind Nazis and convicted felons who would further marginalize the very people who gave you a platform."

== Legal disputes ==
=== Disney disputes ===
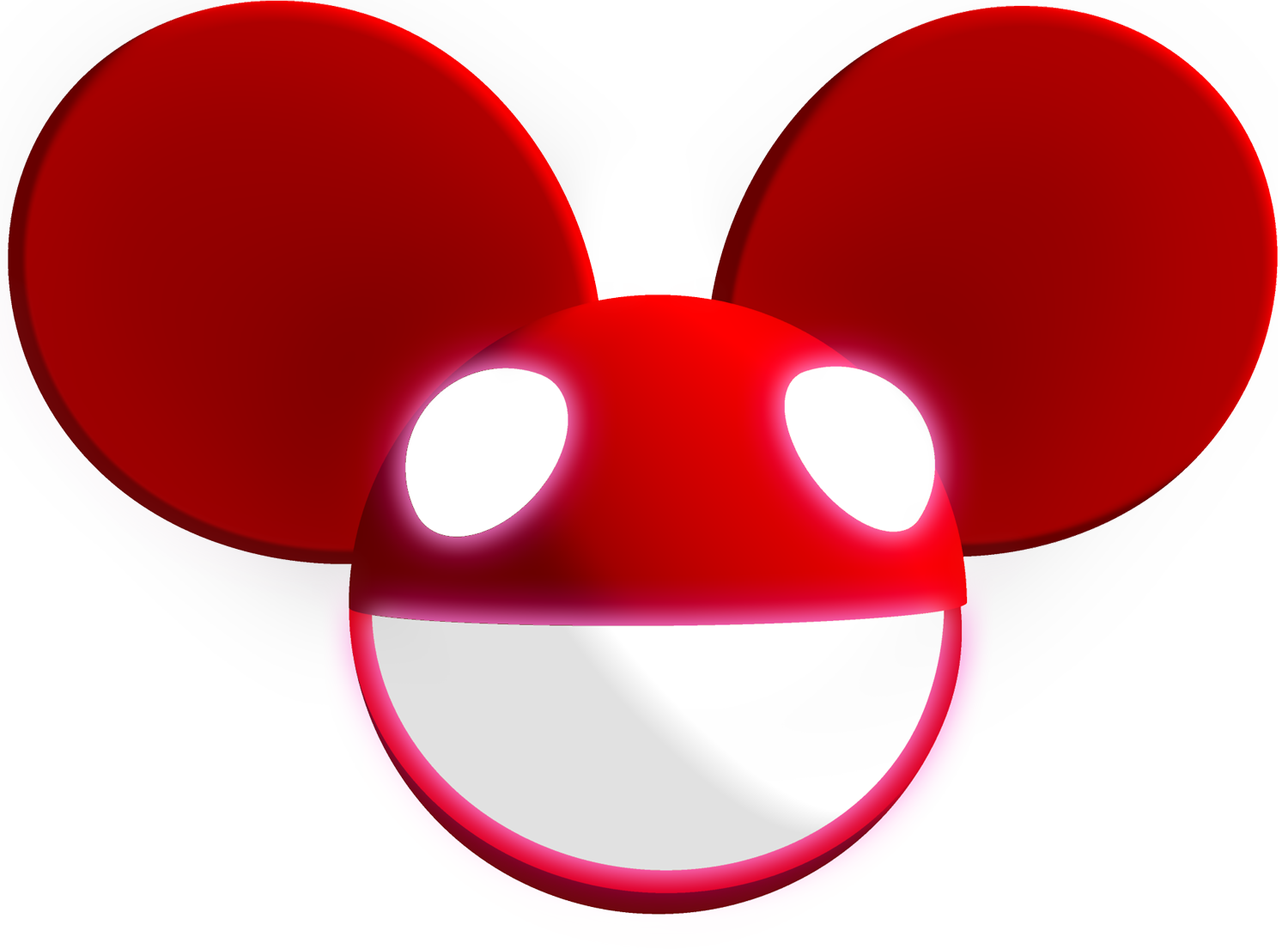
Deadmau5 logo

Basic geometrical representation of Mickey Mouse's head and ears

In a 2012 interview with Rolling Stone, Zimmerman acknowledged possible similarities between his mau5head logo and that of Mickey Mouse, joking that "someone at the Disney patent office fell asleep on that one."

In March 2014, it was reported that The Walt Disney Company had filed a request with the United States Patent and Trademark Office to investigate Zimmerman's application to register the mau5head logo as a trademark, noting its resemblance to the figure of Mickey Mouse. Disney officially filed its opposition in September 2014, arguing that the mark is likely to cause confusion because it is "nearly identical in appearance, connotation, and overall commercial impression" to Disney's trademarked iconography of Mickey Mouse. In response to the opposition, Zimmerman spoke out against Disney on Twitter, arguing that the company thinks of people as being "stupid" because "[they] might confuse an established electronic musician/performer with a cartoon mouse." Dina LaPolt, Zimmerman's lawyer, also noted that the mau5head had also already been filed as a trademark in 30 other countries. Zimmerman believed that he had been targeted by Disney due to their attempts to "cash in" on the EDM market, specifically alluding to Dconstructed—a recently released compilation album containing remixes of music from Disney properties by major electronic musicians such as Armin van Buuren, Avicii and Kaskade.

On September 4, 2014, Zimmerman revealed on Twitter that Disney had used "Ghosts 'n' Stuff" in a Mickey Mouse "re-micks" video (as part of Have a Laugh!) on their website and YouTube channel without his or his labels' permission, and posted pictures showing a takedown notice that had been sent to Disney by his lawyers. The letter also contained a trademark infringement allegation, arguing that the use of Deadmau5's name in material related to the video falsely implied his endorsement. Disney argued that it had properly licensed the song and that there was "no merit to his statement."

In an October 2014 USPTO filing, Zimmerman argued that Disney has attempted to co-exist with him in goodwill. Zimmerman presented evidence that Disney had been in contact with him regarding potential collaborative projects, including an offer to participate in a "re-imagining" of Fantasia as a live concert tour for the film's 75th anniversary. In June 2015, Zimmerman's attorney stated that he and Disney had "amicably resolved their dispute." Zimmerman appeared in an episode of the Disney+ series The Muppets Mayhem in 2023.

=== Meowingtons trademark dispute ===
In 2015, Zimmerman attempted to register a trademark for the name of his pet cat, Professor Meowingtons, whom he adopted in 2010 and has incorporated into some of his own merchandising. However, the registration was rejected due to a pre-existing Meowingtons trademark held by an online retailer of the same name, established in 2014, which sells cat-themed accessories and clothing. After discovering the trademark, Zimmerman petitioned to cancel the existing Meowingtons trademark, citing his pre-existing uses.

In March 2017, Zimmerman was sued by Emma Bassiri, the website's owner, for trademark infringement and unfair competition; the suit argued that Zimmerman's claims that she had named the site specifically after the cat were false. Zimmerman himself told The Hollywood Reporter that "from the very beginning I was working to find a way to resolve this situation amicably", but that he had been forced to "litigate this woman out of existence". On May 15, 2017, Deadmau5 filed a countersuit against Bassiri seeking forfeiture of Bassiri's website and domain name. In March 2018, World Intellectual Property Review reported that Zimmerman and Bassiri had resolved their dispute. Professor Meowingtons died in 2023, aged 16.

== Discography ==
Studio albums
- Get Scraped (2005)
- Vexillology (2006)
- Random Album Title (2008)
- For Lack of a Better Name (2009)
- 4×4=12 (2010)
- Album Title Goes Here (2012)
- While(1<2) (2014)
- W:/2016Album/ (2016)

Collaborative studio albums

- Kx5 (with Kaskade as Kx5) (2023)

== Accolades ==
Zimmerman has won four DJ Awards, three International Dance Music Awards (IDMA), three Juno Awards, and seven Grammy Award nominations. On March 22, 2024, Zimmerman was honoured at the 2024 Electronic Dance Music Awards with the Legend Award at the Eden Roc Miami Beach Hotel in Miami. On June 12, 2024, Zimmerman was inducted into the Canadian Music Hall of Fame, an honour bestowed upon many prominent Canadian musicians.

== See also ==
- Ritual (Marshmello song)
- Happiness (Alexis Jordan song)
- Antarctica (song)
- List of ambient music artists
- List of progressive house artists
- List of house music artists
- List of Canadian musicians
- List of musicians from Ontario
- List of club DJs
