= Mau5trap discography =

Music released on the Canadian electronic record label mau5trap

The following is a comprehensive list of releases from Canadian independent record label Mau5trap.

== Compilation albums ==
Title	Album details
Meowingtons Hax Tour Trax	Released: August 25, 2011; Format: Digital download, CD
mau5trap '16	Released: December 30, 2016; Format: Digital download
mau5trap X1'17	Released: May 26, 2017; Format: Digital download
mau5trap X2'17	Released: July 14, 2017; Format: Digital download
mau5trap Ten Year Anniversary	Released: July 24, 2017; Format: Digital download
mau5trap X3'17	Released: October 20, 2017; Format: Digital download
mau5trap '17	Released: December 31, 2017; Format: Digital download, vinyl
mau5trap X1'18	Released: April 20, 2018; Format: Digital download

=== We Are Friends ===
Title	Album details
We Are Friends	Released: July 30, 2012; Format: Digital download
We Are Friends, Vol 2	Released: November 11, 2013; Format: Digital download
We Are Friends, Vol. 3	Released: February 16, 2015; Format: Digital download
We Are Friends, Vol. 4	Released: June 8, 2015; Format: Digital download
We Are Friends, Vol. 5	Released: August 12, 2016; Format: Digital download
We Are Friends, Vol. 6	Released: March 24, 2017; Format: Digital download
We Are Friends, Vol. 7	Released: December 8, 2017; Format: Digital download
We Are Friends, Vol. 8	Released: January 4, 2019; Format: Digital download
We Are Friends, Vol. 9	Released: December 13, 2019; Format: Digital download
We Are Friends, Vol. 10	Released: February 12, 2021; Format: Digital download
We Are Friends, Vol. 11	Released: January 6, 2023; Format: Digital download

== Standard releases ==
=== 2007–2009 ===
Title	Year	Artist(s)	Type	Release date	Catalogue
"Faxing Berlin" / "Jaded"	2007	deadmau5	Single	August 3	MAU5001
"Not Exactly" / "We Fail"	2007	deadmau5	Single	August 27	MAU5002
"Contact" / "Hydrology"	2007	Glenn Morrison	Single	September 18	MAU5003
Everything is Complicated	2007	deadmau5	EP	November 27	MAU5004
"Give it Up For Me"	2008	Sydney Blu	Single	March 3	MAU5005
"Alone With You"	2008	deadmau5	Single	April 7	MAU5006
"Hi Friend!" (featuring MC Flipside)	2008	deadmau5	Single	August 18	MAU5007
"Bye Friend"	2008	deadmau5	Single	August 18	MAU5007R
"I Remember"	2008	deadmau5 and Kaskade	Single	September 15	MAU5008
"Dog" / "Six Degrees"	2008	Adam Shaw	Single	September 29	MAU5009
Random Album Title	2008	deadmau5	Studio album	October 6	MAU5CD001
"The Spell" / "Raw Chicken"	2008	Feed Me	Single	October 13	MAU5010
"Senses and the Mind"	2008	Sydney Blu	Single	December 8	MAU5011
"Ghosts 'n' Stuff" / "Peddler Of Misery"	2008	deadmau5	Single	December 19	MAU5013
"Slip" / "Sometimes Things Get, Whatever"	2009	deadmau5	Single	January 19	MAU5012
"Catbread" / "Word Problems"	2009	deadmau5	Single	March 16	MAU5014
"Bot" / "Some Kind Of Blue"	2009	deadmau5	Single	March, 2009 (Unspecified)	MAU5015
"Brazil (2nd Edit)" / "Cat On A Leash"	2009	deadmau5	Single	April 9	MAU5016
"Lack of a Better Name"	2009	deadmau5	Single	July 29	MAU5018
"Zyvox"	2009	Moguai	Single	August 10	MAU5019
For Lack of a Better Name	2009	deadmau5	Studio album	September 22	MAU5CD002
"Lyve" / "Impereal"	2009	Moguai	Single	November 23	MAU5021

=== 2010 ===
Title	Artist(s)	Type	Release date	Catalogue
"Strobe"	deadmau5	Single	February 23	MAU5022
"I Said"	deadmau5 and Chris Lake	Single	February 23	MAU5023
"Nyce" / "Blau"	Moguai	Single	March 1	MAU5024
We Ar Lyve	Moguai	Studio album	April 12	MAU5CD003
"Some Chords"	deadmau5	Single	May 3	MAU5025
"Oyster"	Moguai	Single	July 19	MAU5026
"Dynamik"	Michael Woods	Single	August 16	MAU5027
"Animal Rights"	deadmau5 and Wolfgang Gartner	Single	September 6	MAU5028
"8001" / "Stay Planetary"	Moguai	Single	October 4	MAU5029
Scary Monsters and Nice Sprites	Skrillex	EP	October 22	MAU5CD004
"Sofi Needs a Ladder" (featuring SOFI)	deadmau5	Single	November 1	MAU5030
"Right This Second"	deadmau5	Single	November 12	None
"Sleepwalker"	Chris Lake	Single	November 15	MAU5031
4×4=12	deadmau5	Studio album	December 6	MAU5CD005
Feed Me's Big Adventure	Feed Me	EP	December 25	MAU5CD006

=== 2011 ===
Title	Artist(s)	Type	Release date	Catalogue
"Optinuum"	Moguai	Single	January 21	MAU5032
"Beat of the Drum" (featuring SOFI)	Moguai	Single	March 25	MAU5034
"HR 8938 Cephei"	deadmau5	Single	April 15	MAU5033
"Raise Your Weapon (Remixes)"	deadmau5	Remix EP	May 23	MAU5035B
To the Stars	Feed Me	EP	June 3	MAU5036
"The Call" (featuring Tom Smith)	Raized By Wolves	Single	August 8	MAU5037
Meowingtons Hax Tour Trax	Various artists	Compilation	August 25	MAU5CD008
X Rated	Excision	Studio album	September 12	MAU5CD009
"Tommy's Theme"	Noisia	Single	September 26	MAU5038
"Locked & Loaded: Part 1"	SOFI	Single	October 24	MAU5040
"Aural Psynapse"	deadmau5	Single	November 4	MAU5042
"Oxygen" (featuring Fiora)	Moguai	Single	November 7	MAU5041
"Could This Be"	Noisia	Single	November 21	MAU5043
"Locked & Loaded: Part 2"	SOFI	Single	December 5	MAU5044
"Stigma (Neosignal Remix)"	Noisia	Single	December 25	MAU5045

=== 2012 ===
Title	Artist(s)	Type	Release date	Catalogue
"Mpire"	Moguai	Single	January 16	MAU5046
Mpire	Moguai	Studio album	January 30	MAU5CD011B
Feed Me's Escape from Electric Mountain	Feed Me	EP	February 6	MAU5047
"Maths"	deadmau5	Single	February 17	MAU5048
Split the Atom (Special Edition)	Noisia	Studio album	February 27	MAU5CD010D
"Miami"	mau5hax	Single	March 24	MAU5HAX001
"Delirium"	The Frederik	Single	April 2	none
"Palm of My Hand"	Foreign Beggars	Single	April 20	MAU5049
"Lyme" (Moguai's Crushed Lyme Mix)	Moguai	Single	April 30	MAU5050
"In N' Out"	Moguai and Tommy Trash	Single	May 28	MAU5052
"The Veldt" (featuring Chris James)	deadmau5	Single	June 29	MAU5053B
"Flying to Mars" (featuring Donae'o)	Foreign Beggars	Single	July 2	MAU5054
We Are Friends	Various artists	Compilation	July 30	MAU5CD012
"Professional Griefers" (featuring Gerard Way)	deadmau5	Single	August 14	MAU5055B
"Little Cat Steps"	Feed Me	Single	August 20	MAU5056
"Anywhere" (featuring D.Ablo)	Foreign Beggars	Single	August 27	MAU5057
X Rated: The Remixes	Excision	Remix album	September 3	MAU5CD013
"Apex"	Foreign Beggars	Single	September 17	MAU5058
> album title goes here <	deadmau5	Studio album	September 21	UL7915
The Uprising	Foreign Beggars	Studio album	October 1	MAU5CD014B
Love Is All I Got	Feed Me and The Crystal Fighters	EP	October 8	MAU5059

=== 2013 ===
Title	Artist(s)	Type	Release date	Catalogue
"Death By Robot"	Feed Me	Single	January 16	MAU5060
"#MSND"	Tommy Lee and DJ Aero	Single	January 21	MAU5061
"Channel 42"	deadmau5 and Wolfgang Gartner	EP	February 12	MAU5062B
Clouds Vol. 1	Nom De Strip	EP	February 25	MAU5063
Monkey See Monkey Do	Tommy Trash	EP	March 4	MAU5064
"Telemiscommunications"	deadmau5 and Imogen Heap	EP	March 12	MAU5065B
Clouds Vol. 2	Nom De Strip	EP	April 1	MAU5066
Prophication	Le Castle Vania	EP	September 2	MAU5067
We Are Friends, Vol. 2	Various artists	Compilation	November 11	MAU5068
Eekkoo	Eekkoo	EP	December 16	MAU5068

=== 2014 ===
Title	Artist(s)	Type	Release date	Catalogue
Prophication (Remixes)	Le Castle Vania	EP	February 24	MAU5069
"Juxtapose"	Hot Mouth	Single	March 11	MAU5070
"Towers"	Eekkoo	Single	April 14	MAU5071
"Flash"	Lazy Rich and Hot Mouth	Single	May 12	MAU5072
"Avaritia"	deadmau5	Single	May 20	MAU5073
"Seeya" (featuring Colleen D'Agostino)	deadmau5	Single	May 27	MAU5073
"Infra Turbo Pigcart Racer"	deadmau5	Single	June 3	MAU5075
"Phantoms Can't Hang"	deadmau5	Single	June 10	MAU5076
While(1<2)	deadmau5	Studio album	June 24	MAU5CD017P
The Colours	Enzo Bennet	EP	August 6	MAU5077
"Pyara"	Fehrplay	Single	September 1	MAU5078
Hell Is Other People	Eekkoo	EP	October 13	MAU5079B
"Brain Went Ping"	Michael Woods	Single	November 10	MAU5080
"[Censored]"	Proxy	Single	December 25	MAU5081

=== 2015 ===
Title	Artist(s)	Type	Release date	Catalogue
We Are Friends Vol. 3	Various artists	Compilation	February 16	MAU5CD019
"Scarlett"	Attlas	Single	March 2	MAU5087
Collide	Colleen D'Agostino	EP	March 15	MAU5088B
Siren	Attlas	EP	March 30	MAU5089
"Renegade"	Fehrplay	Single	May 4	MAU5090
We Are Friends, Vol. 4	Various artists	Compilation	June 8	MAU5CD0X
Scene	Attlas	EP	August 7	MAU5093
Ephemera	Matt Lange	Studio album	September 10	MAU5091
"Tell Me"	No Mana	Single	October 16	MAU5095
Murmurs	Mord Fustang	EP	November 13	MAU5096
"Parallel Lines"	Attlas	Single	November 16	MAU5097PL
Sin	Attlas	EP	November 20	MAU5097

=== 2016 ===
Title	Artist(s)	Type	Release date	Catalogue
The Silence Is Deafening	Rezz	EP	January 22	MAU5098
Singularity	BlackGummy	EP	February 26	MAU5086
"Aspen"	Attlas	Single	April 3	MAU5099
Patchwork	Matt Lange	EP	April 29	MAU5CD021
8UP	No Mana	EP	May 5	MAU58UP
"Snowcone"	deadmau5	Single	May 27	MAU5NOWCONE
9UP	No Mana	EP	June 10	MAU59UP
Ephemera: Remixes	Matt Lange	Remix EP	July 7	MAU50103
Bloom EP	Attlas	EP	July 22	MAU50101
We Are Friends, Vol. 5	Various artists	Compilation	August 12	MAU5CD005
Game Over	No Mana	EP	September 2	MAU5104
"Descent"	BlackGummy	Single	September 16	MAU5010IG
Strobe (Remixes)	Deadmau5	Remix EP	September 24	MAU50100
Impactor	BlackGummy	EP	September 30	MAU50105
Something Wrong Here	Rezz	EP	October 10	MAU50106
From Inside	Draft	EP	October 14	MAU50107
In The Flood	Oliver Winters	EP	October 21	MAU50108
Blood Work	Attlas	Single	November 11	MAU50110
"Let Go" (featuring Grabbitz)	deadmau5	Single	November 18	MAU5CD023IG
W:/2016Album/	deadmau5	Studio album	December 16	MAU5CD023
Foar Moar, Vol.1	Various artists	EP	December 16	MAU50109

=== 2017 ===
Title	Artist(s)	Type	Release date	Catalogue
10UP	No Mana	EP	January 27	MAU510UP
Life	Blue Mora	EP	February 3	MAU50112
"Frost"	Attlas	Single	Feb 17	MAU50113
"Apparitions" / "Breathing Room"	Robert Oaks	Single	March 3	MAU50115
"Constellations" (featuring Winnie Ford)	No Mana	Single	March 10	MAU50114IG
Above the Blue	No Mana	EP	March 17	MAU50114
We Are Friends, Vol. 6	Various artists	Compilation	March 24	MAU5CD025
Escapist	Matt Lange	EP	March 31	MAU50116
"Metronomes For Pulsars" (Monstergetdown Remix)	No Mana	Single	April 28	MAU50119
"Further"	Attlas	Single	April 28	MAU50117
Foar Moar, Vol.2	Various artists	EP	May 5	MAU50120
Mau5trap X1'17	Various artists	Compilation	May 19	MAU50118
Feed Me's Existential Crisis	Feed Me	EP	May 19	MAU50121
"Clear" (Rezz Remix)	No Mana and Zashanell	Single	May 26	MAU50113
Pipe Dream	Eddie	EP	June 2	MAU50123
"What You Do to Me"	Attlas	Single	June 9	MAU50124
"Prophet"	Fehrplay	Single	June 16	MAU50125
11UP	No Mana	EP	June 23	none
"Relax"	Rezz	Single	July 7	MAU50127W
"Diluted Brains"	Rezz	Single	July 14	MAU50127X
"Premonition"	Rezz and knodis	Single	July 21	MAU50127Y
Mau5trap Ten Year Anniversary	Various artists	Compilation	July 24	MAU50129
Monolith	BlackGummy	EP	July 28	MAU50130
"Drugs!"	Rezz and 13	Single	July 28	MAU50127Z
Mass Manipulation	Rezz	Studio album	August 4	MAU50127
Patience & Time	Draft	EP	August 11	MAU50131
"Jalapeño"	Tinlicker	Single	August 18	MAU50132
"Legendary"	deadmau5 and Shotty Horroh	Single	August 25	MAU50133
Foar Moar, Vol. 3	Various artists	EP	September 1	MAU50135
Magnolia Road, Pt. 1	HolyU	EP	September 8	MAU50136
28mm	Monstergetdown	EP	September 22	MAU50137
mau5trap X3'17	Various artists	Compilation	September 29	MAU50139
Jalapeño	Tinlicker	EP	September 29	MAU50138
Forbidden City	Rinzen	EP	October 13	MAU50140
Smooth & Creamy	Electrocado	EP	October 20	MAU50141
Triangular	Budd	EP	October 27	MAU50143
"Afterglow" (featuring Leo Kalyan)	Frost	Single	November 3	MAU50146
"Crazy Maybe" (featuring Anjulie) [No Mana Remix]	Feed Me and Kill the Noise	Single	November 10	MAU50147
"Maybe Nothing" (Extended Edit)	Monstergetdown	Single	November 17	MAU50144
Magnolia Road, Pt. 2	HolyU	EP	November 24	MAU50148
We Are Friends, Vol. 7	Various artists	Compilation	December 8	MAU50149

=== 2018 ===
Title	Artist(s)	Type	Release date	Catalogue
Substruct	Rhett	EP	January 19	MAU50152
Forever	Eekkoo	EP	January 26	MAU50151
Dopamine	Frankyeffe and Seismal D	EP	February 2	MAU50153
"You (Close)"	Attlas	Single	February 9	MAU50154
Structures	Dom Kane	EP	February 16	MAU50155
ANALOG//DDoS	i_o	EP	February 20	MAU50158
Schedule 1	Heyz	EP	February 23	MAU50156
Bad Habits	Eddie	EP	March 2	MAU50157
"Concussion"	Attlas	Single	March 9	MAU50162
12UP	No Mana	EP	March 16	MAU50163
Nocturne	DkA	EP	March 20	MAU50167
Creature	Monstergetdown	EP	March 23	MAU50165
"Lost Our Way"	Mark MacKenzie	EP	April 3	MAU50166
"Treehouse"	Attlas	Single	April 6	MAU50170
Supernature	Sevendoors	EP	April 17	MAU50172
Ghost	Budd	EP	April 20	MAU50160
Around Midnight	Gallya	EP	April 27	MAU50173
Foar Moar Vol. 4	Various artists	EP	May 1	MAU50174
Blakmajik	Monstergetdown	EP	May 5	MAU50175
"Want"	Attlas	Single	May 11	MAU50176
Exoplanet	Rinzen	EP	May 18	MAU50178B
Rootkit	i_o	EP	May 25	MAU50179
"Other Side" (featuring Colleen D'Agostino)	No Mana	Single	June 1	None
"There For You"	Culture Shock	Single	June 2	SEQ003
"Witching Hour"	Rezz	Single	June 4	MAU50182
"Laimos" / "Cyanos"	Dusty Kid	Single	June 12	MAU50180
Assorted Repetitions	No Mana	EP	June 15	MAU50181
Overdog	HolyU	EP	June 22	MAU50171
"Corrupted"	Notaker and BlackGummy	Single	June 26	MAU50186
"Hex"	Rezz and 1788-L	Single	June 29	MAU50183
Erebus I	Notaker	EP	July 6	MAU50187
Mau5ville: Level 1	Various artists	EP	July 13	MAU50188
"Flying Octopus"	Rezz	Single	July 20	AWD354709
Certain Kind of Magic	Rezz	Studio album	August 3	MAU50185
"Courante"	Attlas	Single	August 7	MAU50189
"Windows 95 On Acid"	Spencer Brown	EP	August 17	MAU50191
13UP	No Mana	EP	August 21	MAU50190
BlackGummy: The Remixes Vol.1	BlackGummy	Remix EP	August 24	MAU50194
Fatal Error	i_o	EP	August 31	MAU50195
"Made For You (Alone Again)"	Getter	Single	September 4	None
Heightened Sensitivity	Anakim	EP	September 14	MAU50198
"Schedule 4" (featuring darkDark)	Heyz	Single	September 18	MAU50200
"Autonomous"	Julian Gray	Single	September 19	None
"In Me" (featuring Kerry Leva)	Matt Lange	Single	September 21	MAU50201
Autonomous	Julian Gray	EP	September 21	MAU50196
"Numb"	Eddie and Q'Aila	Single	September 25	MAU50202
Visceral	Getter	Studio album	September 28	MAU50193
125ER	Monstergetdown and Rhyno	EP	October 5	MAU50197
Spiritual Contraband	Eddie	EP	October 12	MAU50203
Back and Forth	C.o.z	EP	October 16	MAU50205
In Your Eyes	Frankyeffe and Seismal D	EP	October 19	MAU50204
Hollow Earth	Rhett	EP	November 6	MAU50207
Mom and Dad	Mr. Bill	Film score	November 9	MAU50206
Low	i_o	EP	November 16	MAU50208
Mau5ville: Level 2	Various artists	EP	November 26	MAU50199BPV2
"Bad Things" (featuring Fay)	No Mana and i_o	Single	November 27	MAU50211
"Apophenia"	Mr. Bill	Single	November 30	MAU50209
Melted Candy	No Mana	EP	December 4	MAU50212
Rising Sun	Sevendoors	EP	December 7	MAU50213
Charcoal Halo	Attlas	EP	December 11	MAU50214
Apophenia	Mr. Bill	Studio album	December 14	MAU50210
"Eden"	Seismal D	Single	December 21	MAU50216
"About You"	Tinlicker	Single	December 28	MAU50217

=== 2019 ===
Title	Artist(s)	Type	Release date	Catalogue
We Are Friends, Vol. 8	Various artists	Compilation	January 4	MAU50215
About You	Tinlicker	EP	January 11	MAU50218
"Ride or Cry"	J. Worra, Rrotik and Dances With White Girls	Single	January 18	MAU50219
14UP	No Mana	EP	January 22	MAU50220
Polar (Music from the Netflix Film)	deadmau5	Film score	January 25	MAU50221
Mau5ville: Level 3	Various artists	EP	February 1	MAU50222
"Feel Love" (feat. Rosie Doonan)	Feed Me	Single	February 8	MAU50223
"Let Me Go" (feat. Daisy Guttridge)	i_o and Tommy Trash	Single	February 8	MAU50226BP
"Stratosphere"/"Ashes"	Dka	Single	February 12	MAU50227
"Sleepless"	Feed Me	Single	February 15	MAU50224
"Space Between" (feat. Deniz Reno)	Matt Lange	Single	February 19	MAU50228BP
High Street Creeps	Feed Me	Studio album	February 22	MAU50225
"Nineteen81"	Jay Robinson	Single	March 1	MAU50232
"Oath"	13	Single	March 5	MAU50230
Prologue	Rinzen	EP	March 8	MAU50233BP
Space Between	Matt Lange	EP	March 13	MAU50229
Revelation	13	EP	March 19	MAU50231
"Never Change" (feat. HvrdLxck)	Getter	Single	March 22	MAU50234
"House of Cards" (feat. Winnie Ford)	No Mana	Single	March 29	MAU50235
Synthesizer	Flip-Flop	EP	April 5	MAU50236
Make You Feel It	Monstergetdown	EP	April 9	MAU50237
"Who Is It?"	Nofone	Single	April 12	MAU50239
"Highline"	Budd	Single	April 16	MAU50242
"Star Allies"	Spencer Brown and Raito	Single	April 19	MAU50243
Deleted	Nofone	EP	April 23	MAU50240
Skin	Electrocado	EP	April 30	MAU50245
Death by Techno	i_o	EP	May 3	MAU50244
Disembodied	Eddie	EP	May 7	MAU50248
The Mind Can Be Solved	Ghost Dance	EP	May 10	MAU50246
Ultraviolet 1.0	Sian	EP	May 10	MAU50249
Departure	Deathpact	EP	May 14	MAU50247
Wait	Sara Landry	EP	May 17	MAU50250
"Slow Burn"/"Carnyx"	Mark MacKenzie	Single	May 24	MAU50254
"Spangled"/"Bootz N Catz"	Budd	Single	May 31	MAU50255
Stoic	Dom Kane	EP	June 7	MAU50253
Youth	Sysdemes	EP	June 14	MAU50252
"Untitled Forever"	No Mana and Eddie	Single	June 21	MAU50257
Travel Far	C.H.A.Y.	EP	June 28	MAU50256
Still on Earth	Gallya	EP	July 5	MAU50259
My Mind Is Gone	Monstergetdown	EP	July 9	MAU50260
Beat Poetry	Dronehands	Studio album	July 26	MAU5261
"House Of God"	i_o	EP	August 2	MAU5262
Hello There	Nofone	EP	August 6	MAU5263
"See Through"	Callie Reiff	Single	August 9	MAU5264
"Ultraviolet 2.0"	Sian	EP	August 16	MAU5265
Music Saved Me	Rolo Green	EP	August 20	MAU5266
Listen To Techno	Jay Robinson	EP	August 23	MAU5267
Violence (feat. i_o)	Grimes	Single	September 5	None
Melancholia	Ashe	EP	September 13	MAU5268
"fn pig (ov) [Spencer Brown Remix]"	deadmau5	Single	September 19	MAU5269
"gula (ov) [Pig&Dan Remix]"	deadmau5	Single	September 27	MAU5270
"Dry The Rose"	Midoca	Single	September 27	MAU5271
"here's the drop"	deadmau5	Remix album	October 4	MAU5272
"Let Me See You Move"	MSTRKRFT	Single	October 4	MAU5273
"Ultraviolet 3.0"	Sian	EP	October 11	MAU5274
"Sunshine of My Life"	MSTRKRFT	EP	October 18	MAU5275
"I Can't Keep Up With You"	Midoca	Single	October 25	MAU5276
"Minimum Wage"	Sysdemes	Single	October 28	MAU5277
"Dry The Rose"	Midoca	EP	November 18	MAU5278
"ACID 444"	i_o	EP	November 21	MAU5279
"Awkward"	Sysdemes	EP	November 25	MAU5280
"Sinner Complicated"	Attlas	Single	December 5	MAU5281
"We Are Friends Vol. 9"	Various artists	Compilation	December 13	MAU5282

=== 2020 ===
Title	Artist(s)	Type	Release date	Catalogue
"Hotel"	Attlas & Maylyn	Single	January 4	MAU50283
Erased	Ghost Dance	EP	January 10	MAU50284
"Strangers"	No Mana & Jantine	Single	January 14	MAU50285
Lavender God	Attlas	Studio album	January 31	MAU50286
NRG 444	i_o	EP	February 7	MAU50287
Night Visions	Speaker Honey	EP	February 11	MAU50288
Secret Level	No Mana	Studio album	February 14	MAU50289
Your Interpretation	Chay	EP	February 18	MAU50290
"Double-Take"	BlackGummy & Eddie	Single	February 21	MAU50291
Mind	Maison Ware	EP	February 28	MAU50292
"Twin Flames"	SVFN8 ft. Lana Scolaro	Single	February 28	MAU50293
"Sad Boy, Happy Girl" / "Lyfe Lyne"	Moguai ft. Rebecca & Fiona	Single	August 7	MAU50294
"Atomic"	13	Single	February 28	MAU50295
"Disintegrate"	13	Single	April 7	MAU50296
Electricity	Sian	EP	March 27	MAU50297
No Way, Get Real	BSOD	EP		MAU50302
Shade	KEETZ	EP	July 17	MAU50303
AM 444	I_o & Lights	EP	May 29	MAU50304B
"ZEUS"	HI-LO	Single	July 3	MAU50305B
"Know Yourself"	Jay Robinson ft. Idris Elba	Single	August 11	MAU50306
"Pomegranate"	deadmau5 & The Neptunes	Single	May 20	MAU50307
"Pomegranate (Ninajirachi Remix)"	deadmau5 & The Neptunes	Single	June 26	MAU50310
"Pomegranate (French Original Remix)"	deadmau5 & The Neptunes	Single	June 12	MAU50311
"Pomegranate (Carl Cox Remix)"	deadmau5 & The Neptunes	Single	June 10	MAU50312
"Pomegranate (Instrumental)"	deadmau5 & The Neptunes	Single	May 29	MAU50323
Singularity	Kindrid	EP	July 21	MAU50325E
"Somewhere In Between (Extended Mix)"	Eddie ft. Colleen D'Agostino	Single		MAU50326B
"Some Nights"	Morgin Madison	Single	November 6	MAU50327B
"Indigo"	Morgin Madison	Single	October 16	MAU50327S1B
"Clairvoyance"	Ashe	Single	October 19	MAU50328
"Annihilation (Afterhours Mix)"	I_o & Lights	Single	July 23	MAU50331
Revolution	I_o & Raito	EP	August 7	MAU50332
"The Same Way"	No Mana	Single	August 14	MAU50333
"Mirrors"	Maison Ware	Single	August 18	MAU50336
"Half Light (The Remixes)"	ATTLAS	Single	August 18	MAU50338
"Pomegranate (Jay Robinson Remix)"	deadmau5 & The Neptunes	Single	August 28	MAU50343
Secret, Secret Level	No Mana	EP	October 16	MAU50347
"Interrupted"	Speaker Honey	Single	November 17	MAU50352
Out Here With You	ATTLAS	Studio album	November 6	MAU50353
"Bridged by a Lightwave"	deadmau5 & Kiesza	Single	November 10	MAU50354
"Bridged by a Lightwave (Tommy Trash Remix)"	deadmau5 & Kiesza	Single	December 11	MAU50360
"Bridged by a Lightwave (Tommy Trash Extended Remix)"	deadmau5 & Kiesza	Single	December 11	MAU50360B
"Bridged by a Lightwave (Lamorn Remix)"	deadmau5 & Kiesza	Single	December 17	MAU50361

=== 2021 ===
Title	Artist(s)	Type	Release date	Catalogue
"Channel 43"	deadmau5 and Wolfgang Gartner	Single	January 8	MAU50363
"Give Me Some Air"	Kindrid & Kevin Michael	Single	January 29	MAU50365S1
We Are Friends, Vol. 10	Various	Compilation	February 12	MAU50358
Blood Demon Art	HVDES	EP	February 19	MAU50356
Indignation	Kindrid	EP	February 19	MAU50365
"Far From Home"	Morgin Madison	Single	February 26	MAU50368S1
"Fall Free"	SVNF8	Single	March 12	MAU50389
"Start Again"	Morgin Madison	Single	March 19	MAU50368S2
Undulations	Floret Loret	EP	April 2	MAU50341
Living the Phantasm	Morgin Madison	Album	April 30	MAU50368
"Start Again"	Morgin Madison	Single	March 19	MAU50368S2
"Feels Like"	Morgin Madison	Single	April 9	MAU50368S3
"Hiiigh"	Tommy Trash feat. Daisy Guttridge	Single	March 11	MAU50388
Control	Hyper*	EP		MAU50390
"Impact Weapon"	Hyper*	Single	May 28	MAU50390S1
Accelerate	Sysdemes	EP	May 11	MAU50393
Dragon's Gamble	Sysdemes	EP	April 30	MAU50393S
A Remix Pack	Eddie	EP	July 9	MAU50394
Eleven	Eekkoo	EP	May 28	MAU50395
"SMYL"	Notaker	Single	June 25	MAU50397
"Hypnocurrency"	deadmau5 and Rezz	Single	April 23	MAU50398
Living the Phantasm (The Remixes)	Morgin Madison	EP	July 2	MAU50400
"Can't Say No"	No Mana	Single	July 18	MAU50401
"When the Summer Dies"	deadmau5 feat. LIGHTS	Single	July 16	MAU50402
"When the Summer Dies (Meowingtons Remix)"	deadmau5 feat. LIGHTS	Single	July 23	MAU50403
"Physical Layer"	Lamorn	Single	June 4	MAU50405
"Channel 43 (Night / Moves Remix)"	deadmau5 + Wolfgang Gartner	Single	May 27	MAU50406
Together All Night	Speaker Honey	EP	June 22	MAU50417
"Searching For Self"	HNTR	Single	August 6	MAU50420
"The Original"	Wolfgang Gartner	Single	July 30	MAU50424
Individualism	Ashe	EP	August 20	MAU50426
"Cronus"	Kasablanca	Single	November 12	MAU50428SB1
"Waiting For You"	Sian	Single	November 26	MAU50432
Encore	Lamorn	EP	November 9	MAU50439
"Running"	Morgin Madison feat. Fluir	Single	October 29	MAU50441BP
"Hyperlandia"	deadmau5 feat. Foster the People	Single	October 29	MAU50442
"Hyperlandia (Lamorn Remix)"	deadmau5 feat. Foster the People	Single	November 5	MAU50443
Hyperlandia	deadmau5 feat. Foster the People	EP	November 19	MAU50444

=== 2022 ===
Title	Artist(s)	Type	Release date	Catalogue
"Leaving" / "Debonair"	Bensley	Single	January 21	MAU50435
"Drifter"	Morgin Madison	Single	January 14	MAU50447
"Coldware" / "Rolling Thunder"	Psycho Boys Club	Single	February 4	MAU50452
"Nanobite"	Eddie	Single	January 28	MAU50453
"Dark Matter"	Ghost Dance	Single	February 11	MAU50455
"Save My Soul (Extended Mix)"	Maison Ware	Single	February 25	MAU50455BP1
"Empty Space"	Ghost Dance	Single	February 4	MAU50459
"Escape"	Kx5 feat. Hayla	Single	March 11	MAU50461
"Waterbug"	ATTLAS	Single	February 25	MAU50462
Carry It With You	ATTLAS	Studio album	March 11	MAU50462A1
Animate Life	Speaker Honey	EP	March 8	MAU50463
"Killerbite"	Eddie	Single	March 18	MAU50464
"Let Me Be"	Spor	Single	April 8	MAU50466
"Throw Down Let Go"	Spor	Single	April 29	MAU50466S2
"Surdose"	Tony Romera	Single	April 29	MAU50473
"The Day You Left Me (Extended Mix)"	Iupa	Single	April 15	MAU50476BP1
"Starlight"	Tsu Nami	Single	April 29	MAU50478
"Waves of the Soul" / "Lost at Sea"	Massane	EP	June 10	MAU50481BP
"XYZ"	deadmau5	Single	June 17	MAU50483
"Can't Do It Alone"	Morgin Madison	Single	June 24	MAU50488BP
"Transitory"	Kasablanca	Single	July 29	MAU50494BP1
"XYZ (NERO Remix)"	deadmau5	Single	August 26	MAU50501
"Take Me High"	Kx5	Single	September 16	MAU50505
"Alive"	Kx5 feat. The Moth & The Flame	Single	October 11	MAU50507
"Time"	Morgin Madison & Linney	Single	October 18	MAU50508BP
"Avalanche"	Kx5 feat. James French	Single	November 11	MAU50514
"Never Enough"	Bensley	Single	December 16	MAU50520BP2
"When I Talk"	Kx5 + Elderbrook	Single	December 9	MAU50524
