= Lots of Shows in a Row =

2017 concert tour by Deadmau5

- Tour by Deadmau5
- Location: North America
- Associated album: W:/2016Album/
- Start date: March 25, 2017
- End date: October 31, 2017
- No. of shows: 46

Deadmau5 concert chronology
- Meowingtons Hax 2k11 (2011); Lots of Shows in a Row (2017)

Lots of Shows in a Row was a concert tour by Canadian electronic music producer, Deadmau5, to promote his eighth studio album W:/2016Album/, with support from British producer and DJ Feed Me. The tour initially took place just in North America but later toured elsewhere. The tour also featured Deadmau5's new "Cube 2.1" stage.

An extension to the concert tour (in Canada) was announced by Mau5trap in July 2017, dubbed "Lots of Shows in a Row Pt 2". The tour concluded on October 31, 2017.

== Set list ==
=== Leg 1 (North America) ===
1. "Imaginary Friends"
2. "Three Pound Chicken Wing" / "Beneath with Me"
3. "Avaritia" / "Where Phantoms Sleep 04"
4. "Phantoms Can't Hang" / "Deus Ex Machina"
5. "Acedia" / "Stay"
6. "My Pet Coelacanth" / "Let Go"
7. "Moar Ghosts 'n' Stuff" / "Doin' Ya Thang"
8. "Ghosts 'n' Stuff"
9. "Maths"
10. "Maths" (Cobra Effect Remix)
11. "2448"
12. "Cat Thruster"
13. "Legendary"
14. "Snowcone"
15. "No Problem"
16. "Polaris"
17. "The Veldt"
18. "Strobe"
19. "Raise Your Weapon (Noisia Remix)"

=== Leg 2 ===
1. "Imaginary Friends"
2. "Three Pound Chicken Wing" / "Beneath with Me"
3. "Avaritia"
4. "Fn Pig"
5. "The Veldt (Tommy Tash Remix)"
6. "Maths (Cobra Effect Remix)"
7. "Some Chords (Dillon Francis Remix)"
8. "My Pet Coelacanth" / "Stay"
9. "Moar Ghosts n' Stuff"
10. "Ghosts 'n' Stuff"
11. "Harder, Better, Faster, Stronger" (cover of Daft Punk)
12. "Where My Keys"
13. "Polaris"
14. "Strobe"

Note: This setlist is just taken from 1 concert during that section of the tour, and may not represent the entire tour.

== Tour dates ==
Dates and venues taken from https://web.archive.org/web/20170516131405/http://live.deadmau5.com/

Date	City	Country	Venue
Leg 1 – North America
March 29, 2017	New York City	United States	Hammerstein Ballroom
March 30, 2017	New York City	United States	Hammerstein Ballroom
March 31, 2017	New York City	United States	Hammerstein Ballroom
April 1, 2017	New York City	United States	Hammerstein Ballroom
April 7, 2017	Camden	United States	BB&T Pavilion
April 8, 2017	Columbia	United States	Merriweather Post Pavilion
April 10, 2017	Lowell	United States	Tsongas Center
April 13, 2017	Detroit	United States	The Fillmore Detroit
April 14, 2017	Detroit	United States	The Fillmore Detroit
April 15, 2017	Detroit	United States	The Fillmore Detroit
April 21, 2017	Seattle	United States	WaMu Theater
April 22, 2017	Seattle	United States	WaMu Theater
April 24, 2017	Oakland	United States	Fox Oakland Theatre
April 25, 2017	Oakland	United States	Fox Oakland Theatre
April 26, 2017	Oakland	United States	Fox Oakland Theatre
April 27, 2017	Los Angeles	United States	Shrine Auditorium
April 28, 2017	Los Angeles	United States	Shrine Auditorium
April 29, 2017	Los Angeles	United States	Shrine Auditorium
April 30, 2017	Los Angeles	United States	Shrine Auditorium
May 4, 2017	Chicago	United States	Aragon Ballroom
May 5, 2017	Chicago	United States	Aragon Ballroom
Leg 2
June 3, 2017	Frankfurt	Germany	BigCityBeats World Club Dome
June 8, 2017	Rishon LeZion	Israel	Live Park
July 13, 2017	Le Barcares	France	Electrobeach Music Festival
July 14, 2017	Benicassim	Spain	Benicassim Intl Festival
July 18, 2017	Ibiza	Spain	Hi Ibiza
July 28, 2017	Moscow	Russia	Stadium
July 30, 2017	Boom	Belgium	Tomorrowland
August 2, 2017	Leece	Italy	Popfest
August 4, 2017	Pärnu	Estonia	Weekend Festival Baltic
August 5, 2017	Helsinki	Finland	Weekend Festival
August 22, 2017	Ibiza	Spain	Hi Ibiza
August 25, 2017	Halton	United Kingdom	Creamfields
August 26, 2017	Haarlemmermeer	Netherlands	Mysteryland
August 26, 2017	Halton	United Kingdom	Creamfields
August 27, 2017	London	United Kingdom	SW4
September 1, 2017	Chicago	United States	North Coast Music Festival
September 23, 2017	Atlanta	United States	Imagine Music Festival
Leg 3 – North America
October 6, 2017	Windsor	Canada	Colosseum at Caesars Windsor
October 8, 2017	Toronto	Canada	Enercare Centre
October 13, 2017	Montreal	Canada	Bell Centre
October 14, 2017	Alma	Canada	Centre Multisport
October 19, 2017	Morrison	United States	Red Rocks Amphitheatre
October 20, 2017	Morrison	United States	Red Rocks Amphitheatre
October 24, 2017	Vancouver	Canada	Pacific Coliseum
October 27, 2017	Calgary	Canada	Cemetery of Sound
October 28, 2017	Edmonton	Canada	Scream
October 31, 2017	Winnipeg	Canada	MTS Centre
