= List of awards and nominations received by Deadmau5 =

Deadmau5 awards and nominations
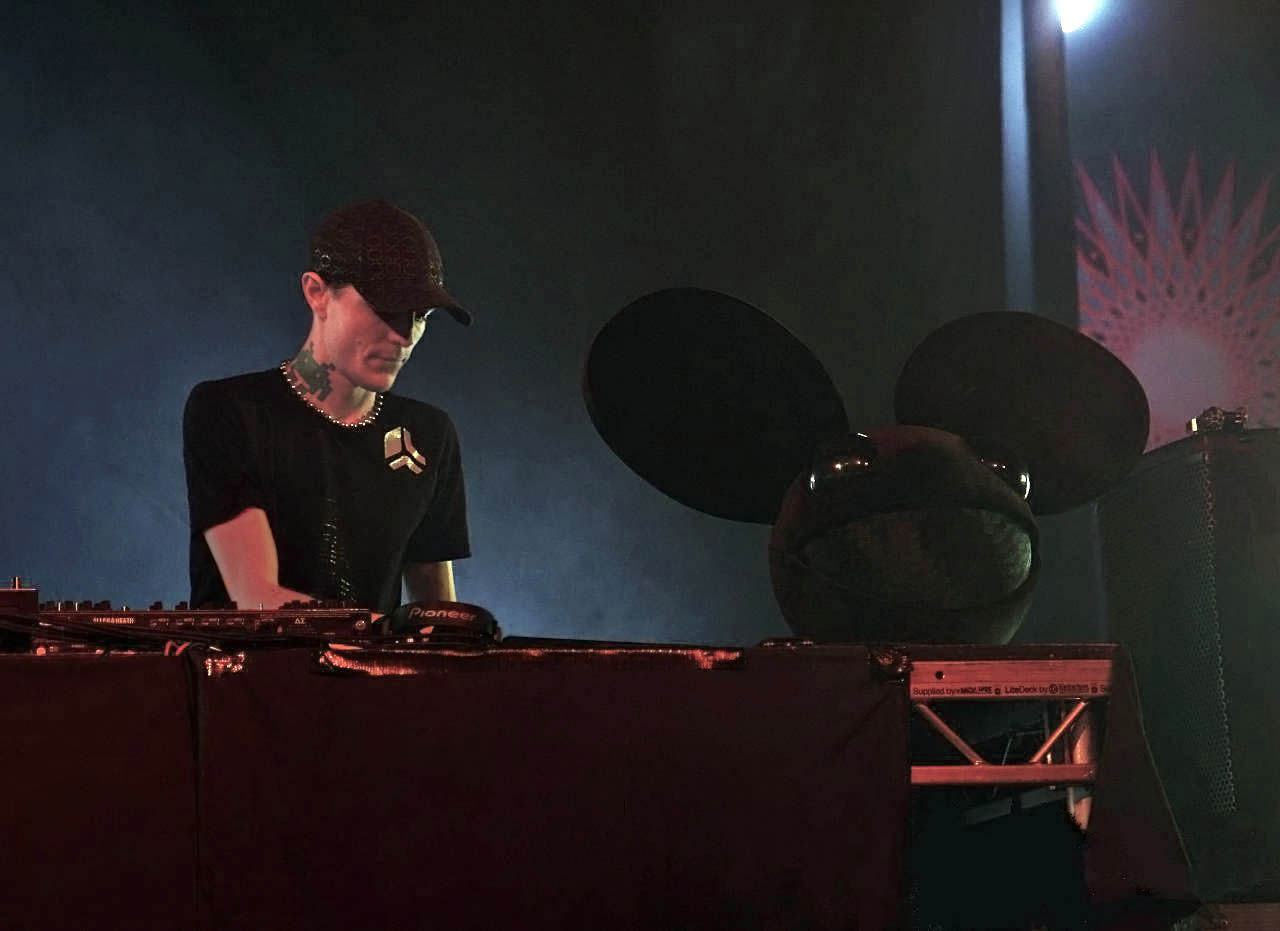
- Deadmau5 live and unmasked in Glastonbury in 2009
Awards and nominations
Award	Wins	Nominations
Grammy	0	7
Juno	3	7
World Music	0	1
Beatport Music Awards	5	6
DJ Awards	4	8
DJ Magazine Awards	0	7
IDMA	3	7

Totals (Note: Certain award groups do not simply award one winner. They acknowledge several different recipients, have runners-up, and have third place. Since this is a specific recognition and is different from losing an award, runner-up mentions are considered wins in this award tally. For simplification and to avoid errors, each award in this list has been presumed to have had a prior nomination.)
- Wins: 15
- Nominations: 42

This is the list of awards and nominations received by Deadmau5, Canadian electronic music producer and DJ from Toronto, Ontario.

Amongst his major competitive achievements, Zimmerman has won five Beatport Music Awards, four DJ Awards, three International Dance Music Awards (IDMA), three Juno Awards, and has also received seven Grammy Award nominations and one World Music Award nomination. Overall in his career to date he has won 15 competitive awards and received 42 nominations.

== Beatport Music Awards ==
On 1 May 2008, Zimmerman became the most awarded artist of the Beatport Music Awards. He was named "Best Progressive House Artist" by Beatport. (In 2009, Beatport also awarded Zimmerman the most awards that year, winning first place in both of his nominations, as well as being given the "Greatest House DJ Ever" award, two years in a row). In June 2010, Beatport announced the winners of their annual Beatport Music Awards, awarding Zimmerman Best Electro House Artist, Best Progressive House Artist, and as the "most influential, relevant and forward-thinking person in electronic music over the past 12 months".

Year	Nominee / work	Award	Result
2008	Deadmau5	Best Electro House Artist	Won
2008	Deadmau5	Best Progressive House Artist	Won
2008	Not Exactly	Best Single	Won
2008	Community Funk (Deadmau5 Remix) by Burufunk, Carbon Community	Best Remix	Nominated
2009	Deadmau5	Best Electro House Artist	Won
2009	Deadmau5	Best Progressive House Artist	Won

== Berlin Music Video Awards ==
The Berlin Music Video Awards is an international music festival that promotes the art of music videos.

Year	Nominee / work	Award	Result
2019	MONOPHOBIA	Best VFX	Nominated

== DJ Awards ==
The DJ Awards organizes the annual electronic music DJ awards event it is the only international ceremony for DJs and also the oldest, the awards are held once a year at Pacha club in Ibiza Spain it is one of the most important accolades an artist can win or be honoured by.

Zimmerman has won the Best International DJ Award 2010 and the Best Electro House DJ Award three times.

Year	Nominee / work	Award	Result
2008	Deadmau5	Best Electro House DJ	Won
2008	Deadmau5	Best Breakthrough Artist	Nominated
2009	Deadmau5	Best Electro House DJ	Nominated
2010	Deadmau5	Best Electro House DJ	Won
2010	Deadmau5	Best International DJ	Won
2011	Deadmau5	Best Electro House DJ	Won
2012	Deadmau5	Best Electro House DJ	Nominated
2013	Deadmau5	Best International DJ	Nominated

== DJ Magazine Awards ==
Zimmerman was also named "Producer of 2007" by DJ Magazine's 2007 Top 100 winner Armin van Buuren, and by runner up Tiësto. In 2008, he placed No. 11 in the DJ Magazine Top 100 poll, the highest new entry in the poll's history, showing Zimmerman's fast rise to prominence. Artists are nominated to the top 100 list for each year the public decides who they rank as the World's No 1 DJ at the end of the poll.

Year	Position	Change	Ref.
2008	11	New Entry	
2009	6	+5	
2010	4	+2	
2011	4	No change	
2012	5	-1	
2013	12	-7	
2014	16	-4	
2015	25	-9	
2016	31	-6	
2017	49	-18	
2018	59	-10	
2019	71	-12	
2020	64	+7	
2021	52	+12	
2022	65	-13	
2023	65	No change	
2024	67	-2	

== Grammy Awards ==
Year	Nominee / work	Award	Result
2009	The Longest Road (Deadmau5 Remix) (Morgan Page feat. Lissie)	Best Remixed Recording, Non-Classical	Nominated
2012	Rope (Deadmau5 Remix) (Foo Fighters)	Best Remixed Recording, Non-Classical	Nominated
2012	Raise Your Weapon (feat. Greta Svabo Bech)	Best Dance Recording	Nominated
2012	4x4=12	Best Dance/Electronic Album	Nominated
2013	Album Title Goes Here	Best Dance/Electronic Album	Nominated
2015	While(1<2)	Best Dance/Electronic Album	Nominated
2024	Kx5	Best Dance/Electronic Album	Nominated

== International Dance Music Awards ==
In March 2010, Zimmerman was nominated for four International Dance Music Awards himself, and his music for three more awards, winning three, including Best Artist (Solo) and Best Canadian (see complete list below).

Year	Nominee / work	Award	Result
2010	Deadmau5	Best Canadian DJ	Won
2010	Deadmau5	Best Artist	Won
2010	Deadmau5	Best Global DJ	Nominated
2010	Deadmau5	Best Producer	Nominated
2010	Ghosts 'n' Stuff (feat. Rob Swire)	Best Electro Track	Won
2010	Ghosts 'n' Stuff (feat. Rob Swire)	Best Video	Nominated
2010	Strobe	Best Progressive/Tech Track	Nominated

== Juno Awards ==
Zimmerman received two nominations for the Juno Award for Dance Recording of the Year at the Juno Awards of 2008 for a track with Billy Newton-Davis and Melleefresh. He did not win an award for Melleefresh's "After Hours" song, but he won the award for Newton-Davis' "All U Ever Want".

Year	Nominee / work	Award	Result
2008	Afterhours (with Melleefresh)	Dance Recording of the Year	Nominated
2008	All U Ever Want (with Billy Newton-Davis)	Dance Recording of the Year	Won
2009	Random Album Title	Dance Recording of the Year	Won
2009	Move for Me (with Kaskade)	Dance Recording of the Year	Nominated
2010	For Lack of a Better Name	Dance Recording of the Year	Won
2012	Deadmau5	Artist of the Year	Nominated
2013	Deadmau5	Artist of the Year	Nominated
2013	Album Title Goes Here	Dance Recording of the Year	Nominated
2015	Deadmau5	Artist of the Year	Nominated

== Shorty Awards ==
In 2018, Zimmerman was nominated by the Shorty Awards for Twitch Streamer of the Year.

Year	Nominee / work	Award	Result
2018	Deadmau5	Twitch Streamer of the Year	Nominated

== World Music Awards ==
The World Music Awards is an international awards show founded in 1989 under the high patronage of Albert II, Prince of Monaco and is based in Monte-Carlo. Awards are presented to the world's best-selling artists in the various categories and to the best-selling artists from each major territory. Sales figures are provided by the International Federation of the Phonographic Industry(IFPI). Nine awards are voted online by the public. The awards are gold-plated, each depicting an artist holding the world.

Zimmerman was nominated in the 2010 category the Worlds Best DJ.

Year	Nominee / work	Award	Result
2010	Deadmau5	Worlds Best DJ	Nominated
