= /2016Album/ =

W:/2016Album/

Studio album by Deadmau5
- Released: December 2, 2016
- Recorded: 2014–2016
- Genres: Progressive house; EDM
- Length: 79:15 (digital release); 76:17 (CD); 79:40 (LP)
- Label: Mau5trap
- Producer: Joel Zimmerman

Deadmau5 chronology
5 Years of Mau5 (2014)	W:/2016Album/ (2016)	Stuff I Used to Do (2017)

Singles from W:/2016Album/
- 1. "Snowcone" Released: May 27, 2016; 2. "Let Go" Released: November 18, 2016

W:/2016Album/ (stylized as W:/2016ALBUM/; pronounced "W drive 2016 album") is the eighth studio album by Canadian electronic music producer Deadmau5. The album was released on December 2, 2016, through Deadmau5 (Joel Zimmerman)'s independent record label Mau5trap. The album's title, which was suggested by fans on Twitch, refers to a computer directory on Zimmerman's network-attached storage server used to store the master tracks of the songs on the album. The album features several tracks Zimmerman uploaded to his SoundCloud account, prior to it being compromised. W:/2016Album/ is also his first studio album to be released exclusively by Mau5trap.

The album had two singles to promote the album, "Snowcone" and "Let Go", the latter featuring American musician Grabbitz.

== Background ==
Deadmau5 first announced the album's release during an interview with Pete Tong of BBC Radio 1 on November 7, 2016. Zimmerman stated that the album would have "an '80s sci-fi fantasy vibe", which he credits to his purchase of a Prophet-10 synthesizer. Shortly afterwards, the album's track list was leaked on Reddit, based on one that appeared briefly during a Twitch stream made by Zimmerman a month before.

Zimmerman eventually revealed that he was not satisfied with the album, stating that he felt it was "slapped together". He had previously hinted that he was already working on his next album. In an interview with Rolling Stone, Zimmerman said he was dissatisfied with the album because "it's not written from start to finish; it's over a year's worth of work that doesn't correlate".

== Critical reception ==
Professional ratings
Aggregate scores
Source	Rating
AnyDecentMusic?	5.8/10
Metacritic	63/100
Review scores
Source	Rating
AllMusic	3.5/5 stars
Clash	7/10
Drowned in Sound	1/10
Evening Standard	3/5 stars
Exclaim!	6/10
The Guardian	3/5 stars
The Irish Times	2/5 stars
The Observer	3/5 stars
Pitchfork	5.9/10
Rolling Stone	3.5/5 stars

Upon release, W:/2016Album/ received mixed reviews from critics. At Metacritic, which assigns a normalized rating out of 100 to reviews from mainstream publications, the album received an average score of 63, indicating "generally favourable reviews", based on 8 reviews. The Guardian gave the album a mostly positive review, stating: "This might be far from a perfect album, but it's certainly nothing to be ashamed of". Rolling Stone gave a mostly positive review as well saying: "Fist-pumpy EDM cheese this most certainly is not. Instead, W:/2016Album/ works equally in a field, car or headphones, the latest catalog entry from an artist who continues to delight in bucking expectations". Clash also gave a positive review, saying: "An album free from the shackles of a major label and its consequential rampant commercialism was always going to produce something that didn't immediately pander to its keg fuelled audience. The surprise is just how well deadmau5 pulls it off. If he actually makes a record he likes – it could be ground-breaking."

The Irish Times gave it a mostly negative review, stating: "The problem is that Zimmerman obviously didn't care too much about the final outcome to bother his hoop on the spit and polish process. Maybe W:/2017Album/ will be better", scoring it 2/5 stars. Jon Falcone from Drowned in Sound gave it an overwhelmingly negative review, noting that "nothing goes anywhere, and yet every song is so long. It's painful" awarding it only 1/10.

== Track listing ==
All tracks are written by Joel Zimmerman, except where noted.

W:/2016Album/ track listing
No.	Title	Writer(s)	Length
1.	"4ware"		8:39
2.	"2448"	Zimmerman; Phil Waring	6:24
3.	"Cat Thruster"		5:36
4.	"Deus Ex Machina"		6:31
5.	"Glish"		2:10
6.	"Imaginary Friends"		7:47
7.	"Let Go" (featuring Grabbitz)	Zimmerman; Nick Chiari	6:20
8.	"No Problem"		6:59
9.	"Snowcone"		5:15
10.	"Three Pound Chicken Wing"		6:23
11.	"Whelk Then"		5:39
Total length:			67:44

Digital bonus track
No.	Title	Length
12.	"Let Go" (Extended Edit) (featuring Grabbitz)	11:31
Total length:		79:15

CD bonus track
No.	Title	Length
12.	"Strobe" (No Mana Remix)	8:33
Total length:		76:17

Vinyl bonus track
No.	Title	Length
12.	"Strobe" (Monstergetdown Remix)	6:45
Total length:		79:40

Notes

- All copies of the vinyl format replace the standard version of "Let Go" with the extended version, although it was not listed as such on the back cover.

== Charts ==
Chart performance for W:/2016Album/
Chart (2016–2017)	Peak position
Australian Albums (ARIA)	58
Belgian Albums (Ultratop Flanders)	133
Belgian Albums (Ultratop Wallonia)	131
Canadian Albums (Billboard)	37
New Zealand Heatseeker Albums (RMNZ)	4
Swiss Albums (Schweizer Hitparade)	84
UK Dance Albums (Official Charts)	4
UK Independent Albums (Official Charts)	20
UK Update Albums (OCC)	82
US Billboard 200	74
US Top Dance Albums (Billboard)	1

== Release history ==
Release history for W:/2016Album/
Region	Date	Format	Label	Ref.
Various	December 2, 2016	Digital download	Mau5trap	
Various	February 17, 2017	Vinyl	Mau5trap	
Various	March 17, 2017	CD	Mau5trap	
