= Where's the Drop? =

Compilation album by Deadmau5
- Released: March 30, 2018
- Recorded: February 2018
- Studio: EastWest Studios, Los Angeles, United States
- Genre: Classical; electronica; ambient
- Length: 67:33
- Label: Mau5trap
- Producer: Joel Zimmerman; Gregory Reveret

Deadmau5 chronology
Stuff I Used to Do (2017)	Where's the Drop? (2018)	Mau5ville: Level 1 (2018)

Where's the Drop? (stylized as where's the drop?) is an orchestral compilation album by Canadian electronic music producer Deadmau5. The album comprises re-imagined orchestral arrangements of his previous work, in collaboration with Gregory Reveret. It was released through Mau5trap, initially exclusively on the music streaming service Tidal on March 30, 2018. The album was released on other digital download services and on vinyl on June 29, 2018. A remix album, containing remixes of the tracks by various other artists, entitled Here's the Drop!, was released on October 4, 2019.

== Background ==
In March 2018, Deadmau5's record label Mau5trap announced the release of the album, describing it as "a live orchestral project [deadmau5] has been working on with composer Gregory Reveret". It was also noted that the album was based on 7, Deadmau5's 2013 EP based on the seven deadly sins, along with orchestral covers of Joel Zimmerman's previous work, as well as unreleased works. Zimmerman had previously met Reveret on a Twitch livestream, in a "Mau5trap Monday" session, from which they got in contact.

The album's release was also supported by a live performance by the CMG Music Recording Orchestra at The Wiltern, Los Angeles on April 1, 2018. This live performance was streamed live on the Tidal app and website. A second live event for Where's the Drop? was later added, for the day earlier, March 31, 2018.

== Release ==
On March 7, 2018, Zimmerman announced the release of the album, claiming its release on his label, Mau5trap, exclusively on the music streaming service Tidal. This caused initial controversy among fans, who disputed the album's exclusive release. In response, Zimmerman stated that "Tidal has an exclusive right to stream the music for a period of exclusivity", commenting that "hundreds of humans who need to all get paid worked on this". In an interview with Variety, Zimmerman stated that "this album wouldn't even be if it weren't for [Tidal]. This is what enabled me to do it". It was also stated that the album will release on other digital download platforms at a later date, after the exclusivity period expires.

On March 30, 2018, the album was released on Tidal. An upcoming release on vinyl was also announced that day. The album was released on other digital download services and vinyl three months later, on June 29, 2018.

== Critical reception ==
Christina Hernandez from Dancing Astronaut felt that the album "does just fine without the explosion of bass-backed kicks and loud synthesizers" as referred to in the album's title, instead it "casts [Deadmau5]'s music in a profound, contemplative light through its delicate layers of string, horn, percussion, and piano".

== Track listing ==
All tracks are written by Gregory Reveret and Joel Zimmerman

Digital download
No.	Title	Original release	Length
1.	"Imaginary Friends" (ov)	W:/2016Album/	1:43
2.	"Luxuria" (ov)	7	3:23
3.	"Coelacanth" (ov)	While(1<2)	7:52
4.	"Acedia" (ov)	While(1<2)	5:47
5.	"Avaritia" (ov)	While(1<2)	2:58
6.	"Monophobia" (ov)	Mau5ville: Level 1	5:38
7.	"Gula" (ov)	While(1<2)	2:16
8.	"Invidia" (ov)	While(1<2)	3:19
9.	"Unjaded" (ov)	Jaded	3:32
10.	"Ira" (ov)	While(1<2)	5:29
11.	"Fn Pig" (ov)	Album Title Goes Here	8:32
12.	"HR 8938 Cephei" (ov)	non-album single	5:52
13.	"Superbia" (ov)	While(1<2)	4:23
14.	"Caritas" (ov)	none	1:38
15.	"Strobe" (ov)	For Lack of a Better Name	5:11
Total length:			67:33

Notes

- All tracks stylized in all lowercase

== Charts ==
Charts	Peak position
US Classical Albums (Billboard)	9

== Release history ==
Region	Date	Format	Label	Ref.
Worldwide	March 30, 2018	Digital download (Tidal)	Mau5trap	
Worldwide	June 29, 2018	Vinyl	Mau5trap	
Worldwide	June 29, 2018	Digital download	Mau5trap	
