= The Chickening =

The Chickening may refer to:

- "The Chickening" (Orange Is the New Black), a 2013 television episode
- The Chickening, a 2016 visual effects remix of Stanley Kubrick's film The Shining by Nick DenBoer
