= Stuff I Used to Do =

Compilation album by Deadmau5
- Released: March 3, 2017
- Recorded: 1998–2007
- Genre: Progressive house; electro house; downtempo; breakbeat; IDM
- Length: 67:12 (released version); 57:30 (free download version)
- Label: Mau5trap
- Producer: Joel Zimmerman

Deadmau5 chronology
W:/2016Album/ (2016)	Stuff I Used to Do (2017)	Where's the Drop? (2018)

Stuff I Used to Do (stylized as stuff i used to do.) is a retrospective compilation album by Canadian electronic music producer Deadmau5. The first 13 tracks were prereleased and available for free via file-sharing on WeTransfer on February 24, 2017. It was released on his record label Mau5trap on March 3, 2017.

== Background ==
The release had previously been confirmed in a Facebook post from Deadmau5's Mau5trap label that initially announced its release for free. It was then officially released on March 3, 2017 for digital download only.

The compilation was originally supposed to feature the original version of "Creep" that was on the Spotify release of Album Title Goes Here for a limited time, "The Big Difference" from Deadmau5 Circa 1998–2002, "Oblistique" from Project 56, & "Bored of Canada" from Get Scraped. These tracks were omitted from the final tracklist for unknown reasons.

Several tracks from the album were previously released on other albums and compilations:

- "Messages from Nowhere", "Sometimes I Fail", "Support", "Try Again" and "Unspecial Effects" featured on Zimmerman's debut studio album Get Scraped.
- "Digitol" and "Squid" feature on A Little Oblique.
- "Screen Door", "Long Walk Off a Short Pier", "Superlover" and an earlier version of "My Opinion" feature on Zimmerman's 2006 compilation album deadmau5 Circa 1998–2002, as well as "Obsidian" (titled "Obsidian (Halcyon441 Remix)" originally).

While not released officially on any of his albums, the track "HaxPigMeow" was originally uploaded on deadmau5's SoundCloud account, before it was deleted in 2016, under the title "Get in the Pig Meowingtons". The track also featured elements that would later become the track "Infra Turbo Pigcart Racer", released on his seventh studio album While(1<2) in 2014.

== Track listing ==
=== Released version ===
Track listing taken from iTunes.

No.	Title	Length
1.	"Messages from Nowhere"	5:00
2.	"Digitol"	3:55
3.	"Screen Door"	4:38
4.	"Squid"	1:03
5.	"Sometimes I Fail"	3:39
6.	"50 Something Cats"	2:25
7.	"Charlie Can't Dance"	2:21
8.	"My Opinion"	4:08
9.	"HaxPigMeow"	10:10
10.	"Obsidian"	6:32
11.	"Long Walk Off a Short Pier"	3:42
12.	"Support"	4:10
13.	"Superlover"	4:38
14.	"Try Again"	2:52
15.	"Creep" (Alt. Version)	4:42
16.	"Unspecial Effects"	3:17
Total length:		1:07:12

=== Free download version ===
Stuff I Used to Do was initially made available on WeTransfer for one week commencing February 24, 2017

No.	Title	Length
1.	"Messages from Nowhere"	5:00
2.	"Digitol"	3:55
3.	"Screen Door"	4:38
4.	"Squid"	1:03
5.	"50 Something Cats"	2:25
6.	"Charlie Can't Dance"	2:21
7.	"My Opinion"	4:08
8.	"HaxPigMeow"	10:10
9.	"Obsidian"	6:32
10.	"Long Walk Off a Short Pier"	3:42
11.	"Support"	4:10
12.	"Superlover"	4:38
13.	"Creep" (alt. version)	4:42
Total length:		57:30

== Charts ==
Charts	Peak position
US Top Dance Electronic Albums (Billboard)	20
