= Avaritia (disambiguation) =

Avaritia is the Latin word for, and personification of, Avarice or Greed.

Avaritia may also refer to:

- Avaritia, subgenus of midges in Culicoides species group
- Avaritia, a volume of the comics book series Cassanova
- "Avaritia" (instrumental), by deadmau5
