= 4ware =

Song by Deadmau5

from the album W:/2016Album/
- Released: December 2, 2016
- Genre: Progressive house
- Length: 8:39
- Songwriter(s): Joel Zimmerman
- Producer(s): Joel Zimmerman

4ware (pronounced "four ware") is an instrumental by Canadian electronic music producer Deadmau5. It is the first track on his eighth studio album, W:/2016Album/. It was premiered on BBC Radio 1 in an interview with British DJ Pete Tong on November 4, 2016. Despite initial rumours, the song was never officially released as a single. Following the release of W:/2016Album/, "4ware" charted in the US, peaking at 22 on the Billboard Dance/Electronic Digital Songs chart.

== Background ==
An early version of "4ware" was uploaded to Zimmerman's SoundCloud in March 2016. However, it has since been removed following his account's compromisation in May 2016.

On November 4, 2016, Zimmerman joined Pete Tong's Essential New Tune show on BBC Radio 1 for a brief interview regarding the release of W:/2016Album/. After the interview, Tong described 4ware fondly, claiming "[it] takes me right back to "Faxing Berlin"-style Deadmau5". After this, rumours were spread that "4ware" was to be released as a single. However, the song has seen no single release since, and "Let Go" was later released, on November 18, as the album's following single.

== Composition ==
"4ware" is a progressive house song with a tempo of 128 beats per minute and is written in the key of G♯ minor.

== Charts ==
Chart (2016)	Peak position
US Dance/Electronic Digital Songs (Billboard)	22
US Hot Dance/Electronic Songs (Billboard)	45
