= Mau5ville: Level 1 =

EP / compilation album by Deadmau5
- Released: July 13, 2018
- Genre: Electronic
- Length: 43:46
- Label: Mau5trap
- Producer: Deadmau5; Getter; GTA

Deadmau5 chronology
Where's the Drop? (2018)	Mau5ville: Level 1 (2018)	Mau5ville: Level 2 (2018)

Mau5ville: Level 1 (stylized as mau5ville: Level 1) is an extended play (EP) and compilation album by Canadian electronic music producer Deadmau5. It was released on July 13, 2018, through his record label Mau5trap. The release features "Monophobia", a collaboration with Australian singer and musician Rob Swire, with remixes, as well as original songs by DJs Getter and GTA. Two follow-up EPs, Mau5ville: Level 2 and Mau5ville: Level 3, were released in November 2018 and February 2019, respectively.

== Background ==
Mau5ville: Level 1's release date was first revealed through various store pages on July 3, 2018. The cover art was also uploaded to Deadmau5's Twitter account. However, the EP was officially announced on July 12, 2018, the day before its final release on July 13, 2018, which is, coincidentally, Zimmerman's name day. The Beatport exclusive version of the EP was released with two additional bonus mixes of "Monophobia". The EP is named after Deadmau5's multiplayer server for the sandbox video game Minecraft.

The opening track, "Monophobia", serves as the return of long-time collaborator Rob Swire from Pendulum and Knife Party, who had previously collaborated with Deadmau5 on his song "Ghosts 'n' Stuff" in 2009. (Note: The instrumental was released in 2008, prior to the version featuring Rob Swire in 2009.) The song was also remixed by other artists who have released on the record label Mau5trap, including producers Attlas, Latroit, and Rinzen. A music video for "Monophobia" was released on Deadmau5's YouTube channel on July 16, 2018.

== Track listing ==
Digital download
No.	Title	Artist(s)	Length
1.	"Monophobia" (featuring Rob Swire)	Deadmau5	3:34
2.	"All Is Lost" (featuring Nothing,Nowhere)	Getter	5:06
3.	"Something Like"	GTA	4:16
4.	"Monophobia" (Rinzen Remix)	Deadmau5	6:41
5.	"Monophobia" (Latroit Extended Remix)	Deadmau5	6:11
6.	"Monophobia" (Attlas Remix)	Deadmau5	5:28
7.	"Nyquist"	Deadmau5	3:18
8.	"Monophobia" (Extended Mix)	Deadmau5	10:00
Total length:			43:46

Beatport bonus tracks
No.	Title	Artist(s)	Length
1.	"Monophobia" (Original Mix)	Deadmau5	10:30
2.	"Monophobia" (Latroit Extended Dub)	Deadmau5	6:31

== Charts ==
Chart (2018)	Peak position
Canadian Albums (Billboard)	78
US Top Dance/Electronic Albums (Billboard)	8
US Independent Albums (Billboard)	22

== Release history ==
Region	Date	Format	Label	Ref.
Various	July 13, 2018	Digital download	Mau5trap	
