= Infra Turbo Pigcart Racer =

Single by Deadmau5

from the album While(1<2)
- Released: 3 June 2014
- Recorded: 2013–2014
- Genre: Progressive house
- Length: 10:36 (single version); 9:36 (album version)
- Label: Mau5trap; Astralwerks; Virgin EMI
- Songwriter: Joel Zimmerman
- Producer: Deadmau5

Deadmau5 singles chronology
"Seeya" (2014)	"Infra Turbo Pigcart Racer" (2014)	"Phantoms Can't Hang" (2014)

"Infra Turbo Pigcart Racer" is a single by Canadian electronic music producer Deadmau5, released as the third single from his seventh studio album While(1<2) on 3 June 2014.

== Background ==
The single, like the track "Fn Pig" from his previous album, Album Title Goes Here, is named after a YouTube video that Zimmerman uploaded where he is playing Minecraft, attempting to get a pig into a minecart. Eventually he shouted "Get in the cart! Fucking pig!". This led to several demo tracks uploaded to his SoundCloud account being named after the line (e.g "Get In the Cart, Pig" and "Get In the October Cart, Pig"). The single samples audio of deadmau5's Ferrari 458 Italia while driving on Toronto's Lake Shore Boulevard.

In 2013, Zimmerman uploaded a demo of the track to his SoundCloud account, titled "Infra Super Turbo Pigcart Racer". A slightly different version of the demo, with a shorter intro, was simply titled "Turbo Pig Cart Racer" and was made available on his website in January 2014.

Another variant of the track, "Get In The Pig, Meowingtons", was also uploaded to live.deadmau5.com in early 2014. The track was a mashup of "Turbo Pig Cart Racer" with another unreleased song, "Meowingtons Enables Hax". While this version never appeared on a studio album, it was re-released by Zimmerman in 2017 on his compilation album Stuff i used to do, where it was re-titled "HaxPigMeow".

== Release ==
The single was initially uploaded to Mau5trap's SoundCloud account on June 2, 2014, before being officially released on June 3, 2014 on iTunes and Beatport.

== Reception ==
Nick Murray of Rolling Stone observed that the single "substitutes the rising-and-falling template for most EDM with a driving house beat that perhaps imitates both the length and the excitement of the long race". Exclaim! writer Alex Hudson remarked: "There's a stripped-down break in the middle of it all, but otherwise, this one is sure to get the kids dancing." In 2017, "Infra Turbo Pigcart Racer" was ranked number 16 on Billboard's list of the 20 best deadmau5 songs. Writer Kat Bein said that the single "has got to be one of the most unique weapons in deadmau5' musical arsenal."

== Track listing ==
Track listing taken from Beatport

Digital Download
No.	Title	Length
1.	"Infra Turbo Pig Cart Racer"	10:36

== Charts ==
Chart	Peak position
US Dance Chart (Billboard)	20
