= Deadmau5 Circa 1998–2002 =

- Unofficial album artwork

Compilation album by Halcyon441
- Released: April 5, 2006
- Recorded: 1998–2002
- Genre: Progressive house; electro house; ambient; downtempo; IDM
- Length: 175:23
- Producer: Joel Zimmerman

Deadmau5 chronology
Get Scraped (2005)	Deadmau5 Circa 1998–2002 (2006)	A Little Oblique (2006)

Deadmau5 Circa 1998–2002 is a self-released compilation album by Canadian electronic music producer Deadmau5, released under the name Halcyon441 on his SectionZ page. The compilation features tracks (or variants of tracks) that were released on his 2005 debut album Get Scraped. Zimmerman later re-released the tracks "Screen Door", "Long Walk Off A Short Pier", "Superlover", "Obsidian", and a reworked version of "My Opinion" on his 2017 compilation album Stuff I Used to Do. The compilation's tracks have been uploaded to social networking site YouTube, but most of the songs have approximately five seconds cut from the beginning due to technical error.

== Songs ==
Deadmau5 Circa 1998–2002 features the song "Aural Psynapse", which would be remade and re-released in 2011, as well as the track "Feelin' Fresh", which the 2010 track "Cthulhu Sleeps" (from 4×4=12) would be loosely based on. In addition, a fragment of the song "Dig This" was used on the track "Bounce" (from the album "Vexillology", in 2006).

"Bored of Canada" is assumed to refer to Scottish IDM act Boards of Canada. This track would later feature on Zimmerman's 2005 album Get Scraped and his 2008 compilation Project 56.

== Track listing ==
No.	Title	Length
1.	"Xeogenesis"	7:17
2.	"Another Mistake"	3:47
3.	"Dig This"	5:52
4.	"Drifting Away"	4:57
5.	"Reakt (Version 0.5_beta)"	6:11
6.	"Section Z!!!"	7:39
7.	"Washed"	2:29
8.	"Mentasmic"	5:54
9.	"Do It Again (Halcyon441 Remix)"	3:55
10.	"I Don't Want No Other (Halcyon441 Remix)" (Originally by Dred and Karma)	5:31
11.	"Good Karma"	4:29
12.	"No Title"	2:45
13.	"The Big Difference"	2:42
14.	"Elephants On The Loose"	3:05
15.	"Obsidian (Halcyon441 Remix)" (Originally by Rubik)	6:21
16.	"Mental Image (Trance Remix)"	7:26
17.	"Hiatus Fantasy"	13:28
18.	"How To Flame"	4:54
19.	"Release v288"	4:01
20.	"Screen Door"	4:42
21.	"Superlover"	4:45
22.	"My Opinion"	6:13
23.	"Feelin' Fresh"	8:18
24.	"Aural Psynapse"	8:18
25.	"The Oshawa Connection"	3:53
26.	"Milk"	1:28
27.	"Intelstat"	6:49
28.	"Audro (Viscosity Remix)" (Originally by Momu)	6:14
29.	"Cafe del Spain"	4:30
30.	"Bored of Canada"	1:50
31.	"American Slushie"	2:51
32.	"Long Walk Off A Short Pier"	3:47
33.	"Homeland Security"	2:17
34.	"Hello Sugar"	3:32
35.	"Uploadin' and Downloadin'"	0:42
Total length:		175:23
