= The Material =

American rock band

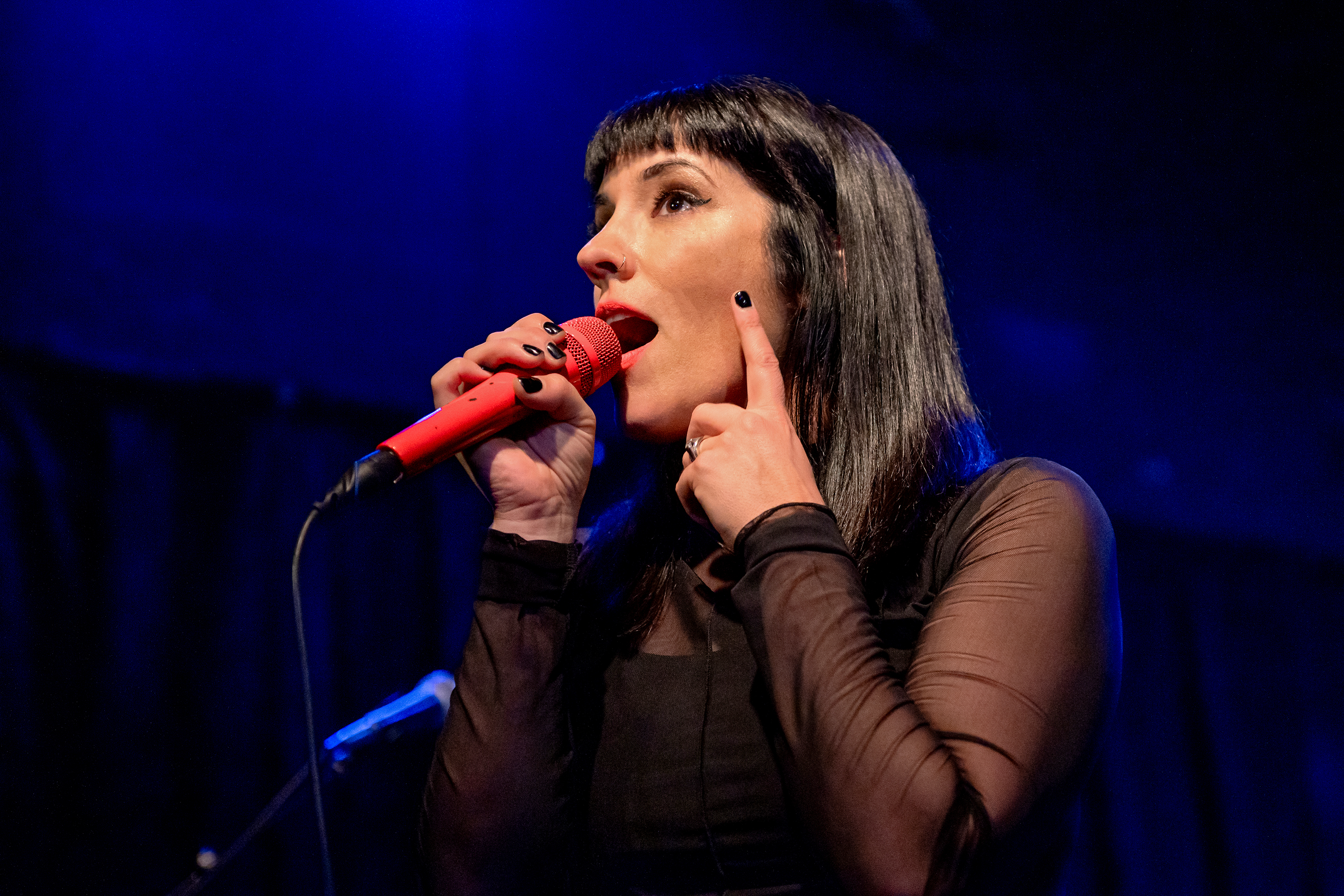
- Colleen D'Agostino performing with the Material in 2023

Background information
- Origin: San Diego, California, U.S.
- Genres: Rock, pop punk, post-punk
- Years active: 2005–present
- Members: Colleen D'Agostino; Jon Moreaux; Jordan Meckley; Zack Smith
- Past members: Roi Elam; Kevin Pintado; Noah Vowles; Kevin Falk; Brian Miller; Matt Holden; Dustin Sherron
- Website: wearethematerial.com

The Material is an American rock band from San Diego, California. Colleen D'Agostino (vocals) moved to San Diego to pursue a music degree at San Diego State University. In her third year, she began playing with Jon Moreaux (guitar) and Noah Vowles (drums). The three added bassist Kevin Falk, formerly of Every Time I Die and Between the Buried and Me, and started writing songs for their first demo. Kevin was replaced by Brian Miller (bass), and Roi Elam (guitar) joined shortly after. With the permanent line up, The Material went into the studio to record their 6-song debut EP Tomorrow, which was co-produced by Brian Grider and was released on September 1, 2007. They placed in the top three of the Dew Circuit Breakout of 2007, losing to Seattle band The Myriad.

The Material has been featured on MTV and MTV2 and their song "Moving to Seattle" is available to download for the video game, Rock Band. They have toured the entire United States and in September 2009, headlined the coast-to-coast Everlasting Sound Tour with the bands Blameshift and And Then There Was You.

The Material released 3 brand-new songs ("Unforgivable," "Before This Ship Goes Down," and "Give It All Back") on June 16, 2009. Their To Weather The Storm EP is provided as a download on iTunes and Amazon.

Noah Vowles played his last show with The Material in February. As of March 16, 2010, the new drummer for the band is Kevin Pintado. Jordan Meckley replaced bassist Dustin Sherron as of August 2010. The Material went into the studio to begin recording for their first full-length album titled "What We Are" in May 2010.

In summer 2010, the band performed on the Motel 6 Rock Yourself To Sleep Tour alongside artists There For Tomorrow, Every Avenue, Sing It Loud, and The Secret Handshake, as well as on the 2010 Vans Warped Tour.

The Material's song "What Happens Next" is the title track for MTV Australia's reality-drama series Freshwater Blue.

In 2011, a side project titled 'With Beating Hearts' was made, with a five track EP released in October.

In 2013, lead singer Colleen D'Agostino was featured in Canadian producer deadmau5's song "Drop the Poptart". The song was originally posted to deadmau5's personal SoundCloud profile, but was not officially released until 2015 (under its new title "Stay", now credited as 'Colleen D'Agostino feat. deadmau5'). She was also featured in his song "Seeya", which became the second single and final track from his 2014 studio album while(1<2). In 2015, she released an acoustic version of "Seeya" along with her first solo EP Collide through mau5trap (deadmau5's label), which featured production from artists of the label.

== Band members ==
Current

- Colleen D'Agostino Moreaux - lead vocals, keyboards (2005–present)
- Jon Moreaux - guitar, backing vocals (2005–present)
- Jordan Meckley - bass guitar, backing vocals (2010–present)
- Zack Smith - guitar, backing vocals (2017–present)

Former

- Roi Elam - guitar, backing vocals (2006–2013)
- Kevin Pintado - drums, percussion (2010–2013)
- Kevin Falk - bass guitar (2005–2006)
- Noah Vowles - drums, percussion (2005–2010)
- Brian Miller - bass guitar (2006–2008)
- Matt Holden - bass guitar (2008–2009)
- Dustin Sherron - bass guitar (2009–2010)

== Discography ==
=== EPs ===
- Tomorrow (September 9, 2007)
  - 1. The Promise
  - 2. Moving to Seattle
  - 3. The Truth About Reality
  - 4. The Long Way Home
  - 5. With One Voice
  - 6. No One Has to Know
- To Weather the Storm (June 16, 2009)
  - 1. Unforgivable
  - 2. Before This Ship Goes Down
  - 3. Give It All Back
  - 4. What Happens Next (CD bonus track)
- Acoustic Sessions (May 1, 2010)
  - 1. What Happens Next (Acoustic Version)
  - 2. With One Voice (Acoustic Version)
  - 3. The Long Way Home (Acoustic Version)
  - 4. No One Has to Know (Acoustic Version)
- The Acoustic EP (April 9, 2014)
  - 1. Life Vest (Acoustic Version)
  - 2. Running Away (Acoustic Version)
  - 3. Gasoline (Acoustic Version)
- Gray States (May 18, 2018)
  - 1. The One That Got Away
  - 2. Take Me Back
  - 3. Give Anything
  - 4. Wayside
  - 5. Mistakes

=== Studio albums ===
- What We Are (January 11, 2011)
  - 1. Appearances
  - 2. Stay Here Forever
  - 3. A Bird Without Wings
  - 4. Let You Down
  - 5. This Is Goodbye
  - 6. Interlude
  - 7. What We Are
  - 8. I'd Be Lying
  - 9. A World Outside
  - 10. The Only One
  - 11. I'm Alive
  - 12. What Happens Next (Bonus track)
- Everything I Want To Say (April 9, 2013)
  - 1. Life Vest
  - 2. Born to Make a Sound
  - 3. Tonight I'm Letting Go
  - 4. Running Away
  - 5. Bottles
  - 6. Skin and Bone
  - 7. Gasoline
  - 8. The Great Unknown
  - 9. Love Me or Leave Me
  - 10. Let Me In Again
  - 11. Chances
