= Blameshift =

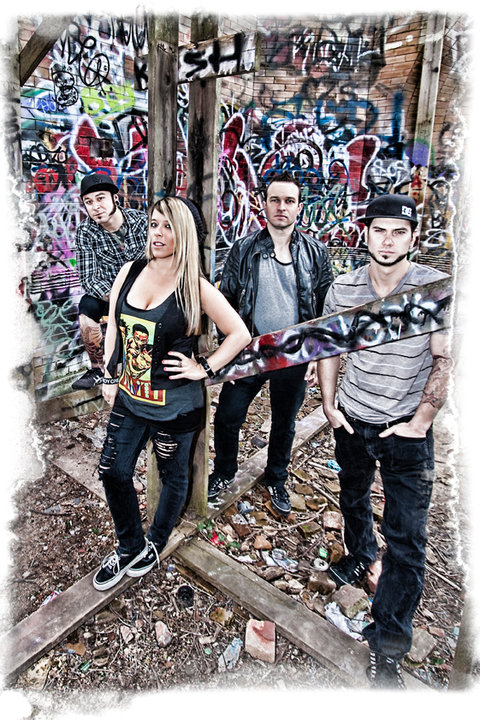
- Blameshift in 2010

Background information
- Origin: Long Island, NY
- Genres: Hard rock; alternative rock
- Years active: 2005-present
- Members: Jenny Mann (vocals); Tim Barbour (guitar/vocals); Jeff Maurer (drums); Mike LaRoach (bass)
- Past members: Joe Meyer (bass); Danny Leto (guitar); Ben Fine (bass); James Miller (drums); Vincent Monticciolo (bass); Nathan Saake (drums); Mike Sarkissian (bass); Dan Scofield (drums)
- Website: www.facebook.com/blameshift

Blameshift is a four-piece rock band from Long Island, New York that started in 2005. The band consists of Jenny Mann, Tim Barbour, Mike LaRoache and Jeff Mauer. The band is recognized for their work ethic, extensive touring history and high energy live show. In 2006 they recorded a self-released album, “Drop Down”. The release was followed by over 150 tour dates including three dates on the Warped Tour. In 2007 Blameshift recorded their second album. “The Test” with Michael Birnbaum and Chris Bittner. The album was nationally released through Smart Punk, F.Y.E, Hot Topic, and iTunes. Alternative Press named Blameshift as “Unsigned Band Of The Month” in August 2008. Blameshift won a contest through Taco Bell called “Feed The Beat” in 2008. Michael Birnbaum and Chris Bittner also produced the single, The Sirens Are Set in 2008. Blameshift toured through all of 2008 in the U.S. and Canada with And Then There Was You, and The Material on the Everlasting Sound Tour. At the start of 2009 producer Mike Watts demoed the bands’ Self Titled EP. With touring in between with Sky Tells All and The Material, the release of the EP was put on hold until February 2010. In May 2010 the band raised $5500 through Kickstarter to record with producer / engineer Erik Ron in Hollywood, California. In June 2010 the band signed with Restless Management out of Venice Beach, California.

Blameshift kicked off their “The Fortune and Flames Tour” with fellow East Coast rockers Dive on 10/25/2012 in Philadelphia for a set of approximately 20 dates highlighted by multiple shows with Bobaflex as well.

== Discography ==
=== Studio albums ===
- Drop Down (2006)
- The Test (2007)
- Secrets (2013)

=== EPs ===
- Blameshift (2010)
- The Black Rose (2011)
- Heart of Stone (2016)

== Sources ==
- Jenny Mann talks about recording new album Secrets set for release Summer 2013! Also hear cuts from The Black Rose album
