= Mau5ville: Level 3 =

EP / compilation album by Deadmau5
- Released: February 1, 2019
- Genre: Electronic
- Length: 55:39
- Label: Mau5trap
- Producers: Deadmau5; No Mana; C.O.Z

Deadmau5 chronology
Mau5ville: Level 2 (2018)	Mau5ville: Level 3 (2019)	Kx5 (2023)

Mau5ville: Level 3 (stylized as mau5ville: Level 3) is an extended play (EP) and compilation album by Canadian electronic music producer Deadmau5. It was released on February 1, 2019, through Mau5trap. It is a follow-up to his previous EP Mau5ville: Level 2 that was released the previous year. The EP features collaborations with Shotty Horroh and Scene of Action.

== Background ==
The first and second tracks "Polyphobia" and "Glivch" were both shown in 2017 before the release of the album. These two tracks also feature elements from "Monophobia" and "10.8" in the previous releases of the Mau5ville series. "Are You Not Afraid" was originally produced in 2014 and features vocals from British rapper Shotty Horroh, who was also featured in Deadmau5's 2017 single "Legendary".

== Track listing ==
Digital download
No.	Title	Artist(s)	Length
1.	"Polyphobia"	Deadmau5	7:30
2.	"Glivch"	Deadmau5	5:15
3.	"Are You Not Afraid"	Deadmau5 and Shotty Horroh	3:11
4.	"Are You Not Afraid" (J. Worra F No Remix)	Deadmau5 and Shotty Horroh	5:00
5.	"Are You Not Afraid" (C.O.Z Remix)	Deadmau5 and Shotty Horroh	6:35
6.	"Hurricane"	Deadmau5 and Scene of Action	3:52
7.	"Hurricane" (Mark Mackenzie Remix)	Deadmau5 and Scene of Action	5:46
8.	"Hurricane" (Offaiah Remix)	Deadmau5 and Scene of Action	6:15
9.	"Quest with Time Limits"	No Mana	5:32
10.	"Over"	C.O.Z	6:43
Total length:			55:39
