= Mau5ville: Level 2 =

EP / compilation album by Deadmau5
- Released: November 16, 2018
- Genre: Electronic
- Length: 53:26
- Label: Mau5trap
- Producer: Deadmau5

Deadmau5 chronology
Mau5ville: Level 1 (2018)	Mau5ville: Level 2 (2018)	Mau5ville: Level 3 (2019)

Mau5ville: Level 2 (stylized as mau5ville: Level 2) is an extended play (EP) and compilation album by Canadian electronic music producer Deadmau5. It was released on November 16, 2018, through Mau5trap. It is a follow-up to his previous EP Mau5ville: Level 1 that was released earlier the same year. The EP features collaborations with Lights and Mr. Bill.

== Background ==
The full track listing for the EP, along with the collaborators, was leaked in October 2018, a full month before the album's official release. The song "Drama Free" that features vocals from Canadian singer Lights, is a revision of a track that Zimmerman made in a livestream in July 2017 when it was known as "Midas' Heel". There is also a remixed version of the track by a British house music producer Chris Lorenzo. The track "10.8" is co-produced with Australian musician Mr. Bill, of which a music video was released on January 14, 2019.

== Track listing ==
Digital download
No.	Title	Artist(s)	Length
1.	"Drama Free" (featuring Lights)	Deadmau5	3:11
2.	"Drama Free" (Chris Lorenzo Remix)	Deadmau5	3:32
3.	"10.8"	Deadmau5 and Mr. Bill	5:36
4.	"GG"	Deadmau5	8:30
5.	"GG" (Gallya Remix)	Deadmau5	7:19
6.	"GG" (Monstergetdown Remix)	Deadmau5	6:31
7.	"Sunlight"	Gallya	6:37
8.	"Boui"	Monstergetdown	5:54
9.	"Drama Free" (Extended Instrumental)	Deadmau5	6:16
Total length:			53:26

== Charts ==
Chart (2018)	Peak position
US Top Dance/Electronic Albums (Billboard)	21
