= Beneath with Me =

Single by Kaskade and Deadmau5 featuring Skylar Grey
- Released: October 7, 2016
- Genre: Progressive house
- Length: 4:14
- Label: Warner Bros.
- Songwriters: Finn Bjarnson; Ryan Raddon; Joel Zimmerman; Steven Andrew Mits; Skylar Grey
- Producers: Deadmau5; Kaskade

Kaskade singles chronology
"Fakin It" (2016)	"Beneath with Me" (2016)

Deadmau5 singles chronology
"Snowcone" (2016)	"Beneath with Me" (2016)	"Saved" (2016)

Skylar Grey singles chronology
"Lemonade" (2016)	"Beneath with Me" (2016)	"Glorious" (2017)

Music video
- Kaskade x Deadmau5 feat. Skylar Grey "Beneath With Me" on YouTube

"Beneath with Me" is a song by American DJ Kaskade and Canadian electronic music producer Deadmau5. It features vocals from American singer-songwriter Skylar Grey. This is the third collaborative single by Kaskade and Deadmau5, having previously worked together on "I Remember" and "Move for Me".

== Music video ==
Skylar Grey appears in the music video. She is injured in the aftermath a car accident with her companion (played by an unknown actor) lying unconscious to the side of the road. Grey crawls out of the car as she sings through her pain and limps toward a light in the distance before the video focuses away from her to her companion, who awakens and runs towards the car. He pulls Grey (who was likely having an out-of-body experience) out of the car as she regains consciousness.

== Track listing ==
Track listing taken from iTunes

Digital Download
No.	Title	Length
1.	"Beneath with Me" (featuring Skylar Grey)	4:14

== Release history ==
Country	Date	Format	Label
Worldwide	October 7, 2016	Digital download	Warner Bros. Records
