= Nick DenBoer =

Canadian director

- Born: Nickolaas Den Boer; December 25, 1979 (age 45); Clinton, Ontario, Canada
- Occupation(s): Film director Music video director
- Notable work: Monophobia (2018); Pomegranate (2020)
- Website: nickdenboer.com

Nick DenBoer is a Canadian film and music video director.

== Early life and education ==
DenBoer was born in Clinton, Ontario on December 25, 1979. He moved to Toronto, Ontario in 1998 and studied at the Ontario College of Art and Design for 2 years before dropping out. He then started a construction company in Toronto while working in video and animation business on the side. In 2009, production work became the focus and he started Generic Versatility Inc., a video production company.

== Career ==
DenBoer has directed and produced three music videos for Canadian electronic music artist deadmau5, including Monophobia in 2018, Drama Free feat. Lights and Pomegranate, a collaboration between deadmau5 & The Neptunes, both in 2020. Nick directed and produced the critically acclaimed short film The Chickening, a visual effects remix of Stanley Kubrick's The Shining, where he and co-director Davy Force used visual effects to alter the film's characters and scenery to create a new story. The Chickening was featured in many film festivals most notably the Toronto International Film Festival in 2015 and Sundance Film Festival in 2016. Nick is also credited as a visual effects artist of the feature film Kuso by Flying Lotus and on the music video Fire is Coming By Flying Lotus featuring David Lynch.

In 2020, DenBoer directed and executive produced an ad campaign called Virtual Influencer Colonel Sanders for Kentucky Fried Chicken through the ad agency Wieden+Kennedy, which won a Webby Award for best use of social media. The campaign featured a lifelike, computer generated incarnation of Colonel Sanders and portrayed him as a virtual influencer on social media in a series of images. He has directed and produced many other advertising projects for the companies and brands such as KFC, Old Spice, DC Shoes, BBC, Adult Swim and Red Bull. among others. Prior to his advertising work and music video directing debut, Nick worked as a bit creator on Conan O'Brien, and worked for Team Coco from 2012 to 2015, producing political satire and pop culture clips for the show. Nick is responsible for creating the series Alex Trebek has Gone Insane which was a recurring bit on Conan's monologue where he took clips from the show Jeopardy! and cut up Alex Trebek's words and rearranged them through editing to make Alex say absurd sentences. Nick also created the recurring Conan monologue series If they Melded where he took celebrities faces and swapped them onto other celebrities.

== Filmography ==
=== Films ===
Films directed by Nick DenBoer
Yr	Title	Role
2016	"The Chickening"	Director

=== Music videos ===
Music videos directed by Nick DenBoer
Yr	Title	Album/artist	Production company	Role
2018	"Monophobia"	Deadmau5	Mau5trap	Director
2019	"Fire Is Coming"	Flying Lotus	Warp Records	Visual effects
2020	"Drama Free"	Deadmau5 feat. Lights	Mau5trap	Director
2020	"Pomegranate"	Deadmau5	Mau5trap	Director

== Awards and recognition ==
In 2019, DenBoer was Prism Prize Audience Award nominee for his work as a director of "Monophobia" by deadmau5. In 2020, he won a Webby Award for "Best Use of Social Media 2020" for his work on Virtual Influencer Colonel Sanders, where he served as director and executive producer. In 2021, his 3D animated music video for Pomegranate by deadmau5 & The Neptunes was nominated for the upcoming Juno Awards of 2021 for Music Video of the Year.

== Private life ==
DenBoer currently lives in Toronto with his spouse, Leanne O'Brien.

== See also ==
- Music of Canada
