= Get Scraped =

Studio album by Deadmau5
- Released: July 26, 2005
- Recorded: 1998–2005
- Genres: Big beat; IDM; house; drum and bass; downtempo
- Length: 66:26
- Label: Zoolook
- Producer: Joel Zimmerman

Deadmau5 chronology
Get Scraped (2005)	Deadmau5 Circa 1998–2002 (2006)

Get Scraped is the debut studio album by Canadian electronic music producer Deadmau5, released on July 26, 2005, by the independent record label Zoolook.

== Background ==
On November 23, 2004, the now-defunct online platform SectionZ launched a remix contest to promote Zimmerman's forthcoming debut album. Contestants were invited to remix tracks he had uploaded to his user page, with the winning entry intended for inclusion on the album.

The track title "Bored of Canada" presumably refers to Boards of Canada, a Scottish downtempo and IDM act whom Zimmerman has pointed to as one of his influences. The track itself is a short, interlude-like track that is reminiscent of the Boards of Canada signature. The track is followed by nearly one minute of silence, and then a few seconds of the track repeating from the beginning again. This is believed to be an error, since a version without the silence can be found on other releases such as Project 56.

The track "Intelstat" contains vocal samples of the song "M01 Chant I – Making of Cyborg" by Kenji Kawai from the Ghost in the Shell soundtrack.

== Release ==
The album has a 2005 demo CD release, which Zimmerman claimed to have been limited to "about 100 copies". Several copies of the demo have since been rediscovered by fans. A revised digital download was released on June 12, 2006. Two tracks "FlashTV" and "Messages from Nowhere" were omitted from the digital release. However they were digitally re-released in 2006 by Nicholas Da Silva, the owner of Zoolook Records on his since removed album Hitless. In March 2017, Zimmerman himself re-released "Messages from Nowhere" on his compilation album Stuff I Used to Do, which also included the tracks "Sometimes I Fail", "Support", "Try Again" and "Unspecial Effects" from the album as well. In 2018, the digital download version of Get Scraped was removed from all major streaming and digital download services for unknown reasons, making the album unavailable to listen to in full. In December 2018, the track FlashTV, later known as "Shift", appeared on the compilation album New Year's Eve 2019.

== Reception ==
Due to the fact that Zimmerman was unknown outside of the Internet at the time, there are no reviews that date near the album's initial release. However, as Zimmerman gained popularity during the late 2000s, online articles looking back on the album's release have emerged.

== Track listing ==
=== Digital download ===
All tracks are written by J. Zimmerman.

Get Scraped digital download track listing
No.	Title	Length
1.	"The Oshawa Connection"	3:55
2.	"Intelstat"	6:50
3.	"Careless"	6:59
4.	"Unspecial Effects"	3:16
5.	"Waking Up from the American Dream"	6:23
6.	"I Forget"	2:41
7.	"Try Again"	3:14
8.	"8bit"	4:42
9.	"Overdraft"	4:30
10.	"Bored of Canada"	2:53
11.	"Support"	4:13
12.	"Edit Your Friends"	3:40
13.	"Satisfaction"	4:34
14.	"Sometimes I Fail"	3:38
15.	"Careless" (Acoustic)	4:58
Total length:		66:26

=== CD ===
Demo CD version
No.	Title	Length
1.	"Sometimes I Fail"	3:36
2.	"American Slushie"	2:37
3.	"Feelin Fresh"	8:16
4.	"Shift"	4:58
5.	"Get Scraped"	4:30
6.	"Messages"	4:59
7.	"Bored of Canada"	1:47
8.	"Waking Up"	6:18
