= Colleen D'Agostino =

American musician and singer-songwriter

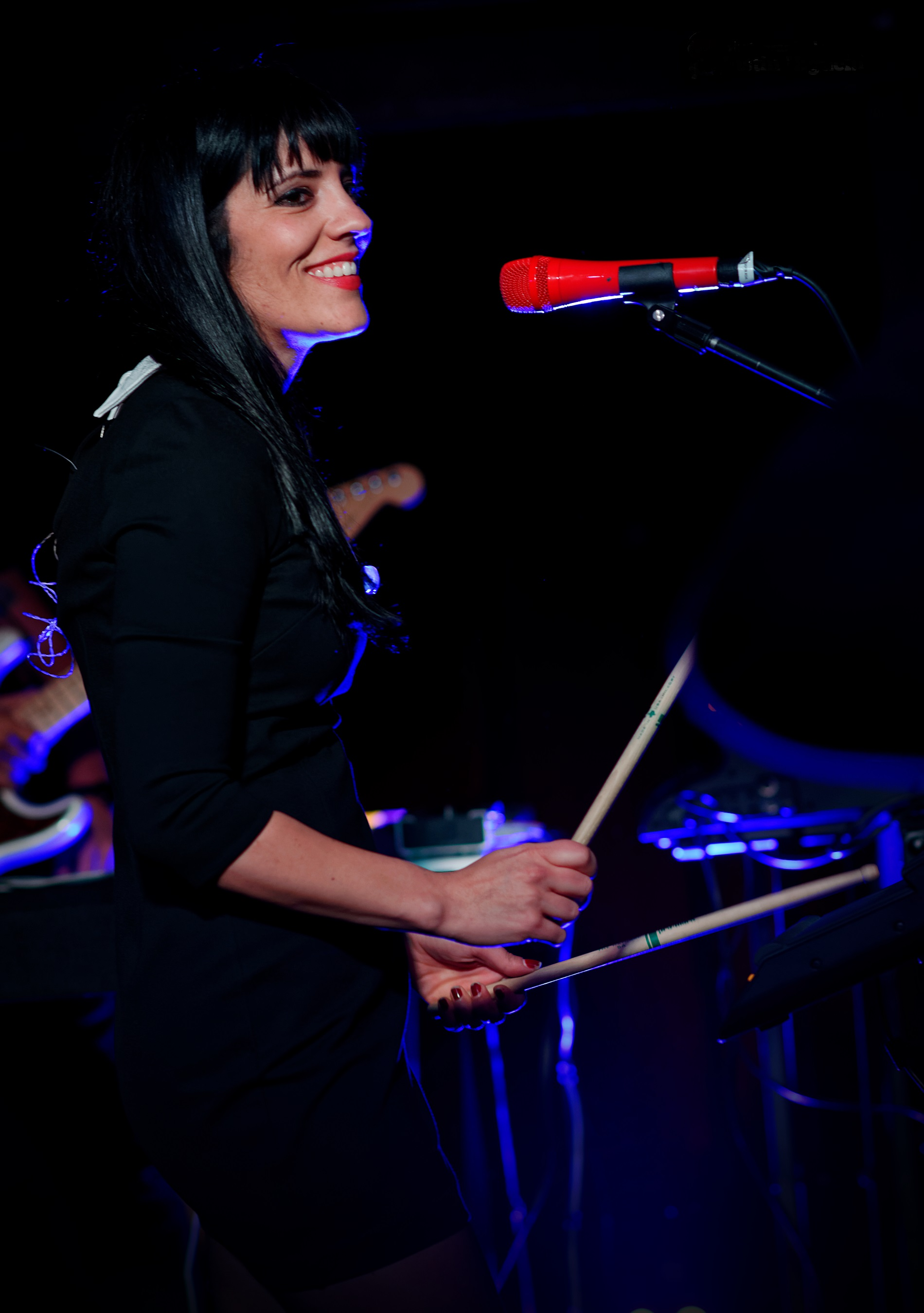
- D'Agostino performing in 2015

Background information
- Born: Colleen Marie D'Agostino
- Origin: Simi Valley, California, United States
- Genres: Rock, electropop, pop, electronic
- Occupations: Musician, singer-songwriter
- Years active: 2005–present
- Label: mau5trap
- Website: Official website

Colleen Marie D'Agostino is an American musician and singer-songwriter from Simi Valley, California. In 2005, while attending San Diego State University she formed The Material. They released their first EP entitled Tomorrow on September 1, 2007. After six years recording and touring with The Material, Colleen started an electropop side project called With Beating Hearts. The first With Beating Hearts EP was released on October 11, 2011.

In 2013, Colleen was featured on a song called "Drop the Poptart" on Canadian producer Deadmau5's SoundCloud. She was also the featured vocalist on "Seeya", the second single from Deadmau5's Grammy- and Juno-nominated studio album while(1<2). "Seeya" has since gone platinum in Canada, after Colleen and deadmau5 performed the song on the 2015 Juno Awards on March 15, 2015 in Hamilton, Ontario, Canada.

After the success of her collaborations with Deadmau5, Colleen was signed to the producer's imprint label, mau5trap. Her debut EP on mau5trap, Collide, was released on March 15, 2015. The "Drop the Poptart" demo was expanded and released as the first single from Collide as "Stay (featuring Deadmau5)."

== Career ==
=== The Material (2005–present) ===
The Material was formed in 2005 in San Diego, with an original line up of Colleen D'Agostino (vocals), Jon Moreaux (guitars), and Noah Vowles (drums). The trio soon added bassist Kevin Falk to the lineup. Before recording their debut EP, Tomorrow, Kevin was replaced by Brian Miller, and Roi Elam joined as a second guitarist. Co-produced by Brian Grider and the band, Tomorrow was released on September 1, 2007. The Material reached the Top 3 in MTV2 and Mountain Dew's Dew Circuit Breakout competition, losing to Seattle-based The Myriad. "Moving to Seattle" was made available on the multi-platform video game Rock Band.

In advance of their 2009 nationwide tour with Blameshift and And Then There Was You, The Material recorded their second EP, To Weather the Storm. This EP was released digitally on June 16, 2009.

In 2010, the band went back into the studio to record their first full-length album What We Are.Noah Vowles was replaced on drums by Kevin Pintado, and Jordan Meckley replaced Dustin Sherron on bass. After recording What We Are, the band performed on the Motel 6 Rock Yourself to Sleep Tour alongside Every Avenue, There For Tomorrow, Sing It Loud and The Secret Handshake and the 2012 Warped Tour.What We Are was released both physically and digitally on January 11, 2011. The title track "What We Are" is the theme song for MTV Australia's Freshwater Blue.

The Material returned in 2013 with their second full-length album Everything I Want To Say, released on April 9, 2013, and a west coast tour with Red Jumpsuit Apparatus. The band is currently on hiatus while Colleen pursues a solo career.

=== Solo and With Beating Hearts (2011–present) ===
In 2011, Colleen formed an electropop side project called With Beating Hearts. A five-track self-titled debut EP was released on October 11, 2011, followed by a remix EP featuring remixes from Blake Harnage of VERSA, Joel Piper, Tai LeGagnoux, Blake Miller and AiRWOLF, and RoboCLIP on July 30, 2013.

In the fall of 2013, Colleen was asked to submit some top line ideas for Deadmau5's upcoming studio album after members of his Mau5trap label's staff attended one of The Material's shows. Shortly thereafter, Deadmau5 posted a sketch called "Drop the Poptart" to his SoundCloud page. Variations of the song could be heard during future Deadmau5 live performances and several Deadmau5 live streams from his studio. The song eventually became "Stay (featuring Deadmau5)" and was included on Colleen's debut mau5trap EP, Collide.

With Beating Hearts' third EP, The Wolves was released on February 4, 2014. The music video for the first single, "Drag Me Down," premiered on popular EDM blog, LessThan3.

Colleen and Deadmau5 collaborated again on "Seeya, the second single from his while(1<2) album on Astralwerks/Virgin Records/Universal Music Group." "Seeya" was released as a digital download on May 27, 2014, with the while(1<2) album following on June 17, 2014. The song was certified gold by Music Canada in October 2014 and platinum in March 2015. Colleen and deadmau5 performed "Seeya" live for the first time on the 2015 Juno Awards in Hamilton, Ontario, Canada.

mau5trap released Colleen's Collide EP on March 15, 2015 to coincide with Colleen's performance with Deadmau5 on the Juno Awards. The EP features productions by Deadmau5, Matt Lange and Eekkoo, John Major, Roc Nation producer Ben Harrison and AyB, and Blake Harnage.

== Discography ==
=== With The Material ===
==== Studio albums ====
- What We Are (January 11, 2011)
- Everything I Want To Say (April 9, 2013)

==== Extended plays ====
- Tomorrow (September 9, 2007)
- To Weather the Storm (June 16, 2009)
- Acoustic Sessions (May 1, 2010)
- The Acoustic EP (April 9, 2014)
- Gray States (May 18, 2018)

=== Solo and with Beating Hearts ===
- With Beating Hearts EP (October 11, 2011)
- The Remixes EP (July 30, 2013)
- The Wolves EP (February 4, 2014)
- Collide EP (March 15, 2015)

=== Collaborations ===
| Year | Song | Artist | Album |
|---|---|---|---|
| 2013 | "Four Letter Words" | I the Mighty | Satori |
| 2013 | "Who You Love (John Mayer Cover)" | The Goodnight | Covers EP |
| 2014 | "Seeya" | Deadmau5 featuring Colleen D'Agostino | while(1<2) |
| 2018 | "Other Side" | No Mana featuring Colleen D'Agostino | Assorted Repetitions |
| 2020 | "Somewhere In Between" | EDDIE featuring Colleen D'Agostino | Single |
| 2021 | "Feels Like" | Attlas featuring Colleen D'Agostino | We Are Friends vol. 10 |
| 2024 | "I Am Here" | Kumarion, Bensley, Colleen D'Agostino | Single |
| 2026 | “Fight” | AZRUM, Colleen D’Agostino | Single |
