= Monophobia (song) =

Song by Deadmau5

Song by Deadmau5 featuring Rob Swire

from the EP Mau5ville: Level 1
- Released: July 13, 2018
- Recorded: 2017–18
- Genre: Progressive house
- Length: 3:35; 10:00 (extended vocal mix); 10:30 (original mix)
- Label: Mau5trap
- Songwriter: Joel Zimmerman
- Producer: Joel Zimmerman

Music video
- "Monophobia" on YouTube

"Monophobia" is a song by Canadian electronic music producer Deadmau5 featuring Australian singer Rob Swire. It was released on July 13, 2018, as the first track on Deadmau5's EP and compilation album Mau5ville: Level 1. Prior to its release on the EP, an orchestral rendition of the song was featured on Deadmau5's Where's the Drop?. On release, the song charted on the US Dance/Electronic Songs chart, peaking number 19. A music video for the song was released on Deadmau5's YouTube channel on July 16, 2018.

== Background and release ==
Deadmau5 and Rob Swire had previously collaborated on "Ghosts 'n' Stuff", nine years prior to "Monophobia". The instrumental of "Monophobia" had been created on a Twitch livestream in 2017, and an orchestral rendition of the song was featured as the sixth track on Deadmau5's orchestral compilation album, Where's the Drop?, on March 30, 2018, four months before the original song's official release. The song's release was announced for the EP and compilation album, Mau5ville: Level 1, on July 12, 2018, and was released one day later. The song was also uploaded to the SoundCloud account of Rob Swire's Knife Party on July 23, 2018. Upon the release of Mau5ville: level 1, the song independently charted in the United States, appearing on the Dance/Electronic Songs and Digital Songs charts at positions 19 and 9 respectively. The song also charted in Canada, peaking at number 37 on the Canadian Digital Song Sales chart. Despite the song's success, it was not released as a single.

== Music video ==
A still from the music video

The music video for "Monophobia" was released on Deadmau5's YouTube channel on July 16, 2018. It was directed by Nick DenBoer and Kenny Hotz, and produced by the Nick DenBoer Production Company and Generic Versatility Animation. It currently has acquired over 13 million views on YouTube.

The video is acclaimed for its "bizarre" style of computer generated 3D animation by Nick DenBoer, also known as Smearballs. It was filmed in Deadmau5's residence in Campbellville, Ontario, Canada, and shows footage of animated beings dancing and performing various activities in and around his household. Deadmau5 makes physical appearances throughout the video and Tory Belleci of MythBusters fame makes a cameo appearance as well. The surrealism of the video has been compared to Cool 3D World and Cyriak. In an interview with Animation World Network, DenBoer stated

"[The music video] was a bit of a free-form project. I had no idea what I was going to do when I shot it other than that I wanted to make a weird house party. I originally showed Joel this little clip I made of my studio and suggested we do a bigger version of his mansion. [...] and then it turned into this crazy music video".

== Credits and personnel ==
Adapted from the music video.

- Joel Zimmerman (Deadmau5) – writing, production
- Rob Swire – vocals
- Nick DenBoer – music video director, visual effects
- Kenny Hotz – music video director
- Nick DenBoer Production Company – music video production
- Generic Versatility Animation – music video production

== Charts ==
=== Weekly charts ===
| Chart (2018) | Peak position |
|---|---|
| Canadian Digital Song Sales (Billboard) | 37 |
| US Hot Dance/Electronic Songs (Billboard) | 19 |

=== Year-end charts ===
| Chart (2018) | Position |
|---|---|
| US Hot Dance/Electronic Songs (Billboard) | 98 |
