= Phantoms Can't Hang =

Single by Deadmau5

from the album While(1<2)
- Released: June 10, 2014
- Recorded: 2013–2014
- Genre: Progressive house
- Length: 9:15
- Label: Mau5trap; Astralwerks; Virgin EMI
- Songwriter: Joel Zimmerman
- Producer: Deadmau5

Deadmau5 singles chronology
"Infra Turbo Pigcart Racer" (2014)	"Phantoms Can't Hang" (2014)	"Snowcone" (2016)

"Phantoms Can't Hang" is a song by Canadian electronic music producer Deadmau5, released as the fourth and final single from his seventh studio album While(1<2) on June 10, 2014.

== Background and release ==
This song was originally combined with another song by him ("Avaritia") and uploaded to his SoundCloud account, prior to its deletion, where it was titled 'Where Phantoms Sleep 04' before the two were separated into individual tracks.

The song premiered through SoundCloud the day before its release on June 9, 2014, before officially releasing on June 10, 2014.

== Track listing ==
Digital download and stream
No.	Title	Length
1.	"Phantoms Can't Hang"	9:15

== Charts ==
Chart performance for "Phantoms Can't Hang"
Chart (2014)	Peak position
Australia (ARIA)	97
Canada Hot 100 (Billboard)	78
US Hot Dance/Electronic Songs (Billboard)	16
