= Seeya (Deadmau5 song) =

Single by Deadmau5 featuring Colleen D'Agostino

from the album While(1<2)
- Released: 27 May 2014
- Genre: Funktronica; complextro
- Length: 6:43
- Label: Mau5trap; Astralwerks; Virgin EMI
- Songwriter(s): Colleen D'Agostino; Joel Zimmerman
- Producer(s): Deadmau5

Deadmau5 singles chronology
"Avaritia" (2014)	"Seeya" (2014)	"Infra Turbo Pigcart Racer" (2014)

"Seeya" is a song by Canadian electronic music producer Deadmau5 featuring vocals by American singer Colleen D'Agostino from the punk rock band The Material. It was released as the second single from his seventh studio album While(1<2) on 27 May 2014. The track is also an updated revision of an unreleased instrumental by Deadmau5, titled "Seeya Next Tuesday".

== Track listing ==
Digital Download
No.	Title	Length
1.	"Seeya"	6:40

== Charts ==
=== Weekly charts ===
Chart (2014)	Peak position
Australia Dance (ARIA)	15
Belgium (Ultratip Bubbling Under Flanders)	90
Belgium Dance Bubbling Under (Ultratop Flanders)	5
Canada (Canadian Hot 100)	20
Canada CHR/Top 40 (Billboard)	7
Canada Hot AC (Billboard)	18
US Hot Dance/Electronic Songs (Billboard)	25

=== Year-end charts ===
Chart (2014)	Peak position
Canada (Canadian Hot 100)	66

== Certifications ==
Region	Certification	Certified units/sales
Canada (Music Canada)	Platinum	80,000^{‡}
^{‡} Sales+streaming figures based on certification alone.
