= Random Album Title =

Studio album by Deadmau5
- Released: September 2, 2008
- Recorded: 2006–2008
- Genres: Progressive house; electro house; ambient house; trance
- Length: 83:10 (unmixed version); 72:33 (mixed version)
- Labels: Mau5trap; Ultra (US); Ministry of Sound (UK)
- Producer: Joel Zimmerman

Deadmau5 chronology
Project 56 (2006)	Random Album Title (2008)	It Sounds Like (2009)

Alternate cover
- Cover art for UK physical release

Singles from Random Album Title
- 1. "Faxing Berlin" Released: October 25, 2006; 2. "Not Exactly" Released: August 27, 2007; 3. "Arguru" Released: December 13, 2007; 4. "Alone with You" Released: April 7, 2008; 5. "I Remember" Released: September 15, 2008; 6. "Slip" Released: December 8, 2008; 7. "Brazil (2nd Edit)" Released: April 9, 2009

Professional ratings
Review scores
Source	Rating
AllMusic	3/5 stars
The Skinny	4/5 stars

Random Album Title is the third studio album by Canadian electronic music producer Deadmau5, released by Ultra Records and Mau5trap on September 2, 2008. The album includes the singles "Faxing Berlin", "Not Exactly" and "I Remember" (with Kaskade). Following the success of "I Remember" in the UK, Random Album Title later entered the UK Albums Chart at number 31 in May 2009.

== Songs ==
The track "Slip" is named after its hook, which intentionally falls out of time with the beat and melody of the song.

The original mix of "Faxing Berlin" is 8:37 compared to the mixed album version's length, which is only 2:36. Combined with its preceding acoustic piano intro on the continuous mix version it is 4:15. On the unmixed version, both these tracks are replaced by the original mix.

The track "Arguru" was written in memory of Juan Antonio Arguelles Rius (nicknamed Arguru), an audio software developer and musician. The composition of the 2010 song "I Said" by deadmau5 and Chris Lake (who also co-wrote "Arguru") would later be similar to the song.

== Track listing ==
All tracks are written by Joel Zimmerman, except where noted.

Mixed version
No.	Title	Length
1.	"Sometimes Things Get, Whatever"	7:15
2.	"Complications"	5:31
3.	"Slip"	6:44
4.	"Some Kind of Blue"	6:19
5.	"Brazil (2nd Edit)"	5:33
6.	"Alone with You"	7:30
7.	"I Remember" (with Kaskade; vocals by Haley Gibby; co-written by Ryan Raddon and Finn Bjarnson)	9:07
8.	"Faxing Berlin" (piano acoustic version)	1:39
9.	"Faxing Berlin"	2:36
10.	"Not Exactly"	8:00
11.	"Arguru" (co-written by Chris Lake)	5:30
12.	"So There I Was"	6:49
Total length:		72:33

Unmixed version
No.	Title	Length
1.	"Sometimes Things Get, Whatever"	8:20
2.	"Complications"	9:52
3.	"Slip"	7:43
4.	"Some Kind of Blue"	7:59
5.	"Brazil (2nd Edit)"	6:37
6.	"Alone with You"	8:11
7.	"I Remember" (with Kaskade; vocals by Haley Gibby; co-written by Ryan Raddon and Finn Bjarnson)	9:53
8.	"Faxing Berlin"	8:41
9.	"Not Exactly"	9:15
10.	"So There I Was"	6:45
Total length:		83:16

The track “Faxing Berlin” was removed from vinyl and streaming track lists due to label issues.

== In popular culture ==
The track "Brazil (2nd Edit)" has been used numerous times by other artists. Kylie Minogue sampled the song in the sessions for her album Aphrodite in an unreleased song named "Change Your Mind". Alexis Jordan also used the song on her single, "Happiness". It has also been used by Taio Cruz in his song "Touch the Sky". It was used as part of a remixed mash-up of it and Haley Gibby's 2010 song "Falling in Love" as "Falling in Love With Brazil." The first edit of "Brazil" has seen no official release but can be found online on sites such as YouTube.

== Charts ==
Chart (2008–09)	Peak position
Scottish Albums (Official Charts)	55
UK Albums (Official Charts)	31
UK Dance Albums (Official Charts)	3
UK Album Downloads (Official Charts)	9
US Top Dance Albums (Billboard)	13

== Certifications ==
Region	Certification	Certified units/sales
Canada (Music Canada)	Gold	40,000^{^}
United Kingdom (BPI)	Gold	100,000^{‡}
^{^} Shipments figures based on certification alone.^{‡} Sales+streaming figures based on certification alone.
