= Snowcone (instrumental) =

Single by Deadmau5

from the album W:/2016Album/
- Released: May 27, 2016
- Recorded: 2016
- Genre: Trip hop; downtempo
- Length: 5:14
- Label: Mau5trap
- Songwriter: Joel Zimmerman

Deadmau5 singles chronology
| "Phantoms Can't Hang" (2014) | "Snowcone" (2016) | "Beneath with Me" (2016) |

"Snowcone" is an instrumental by Canadian electronic music producer Deadmau5. It was originally uploaded on SoundCloud before being released on May 27, 2016 as a standalone digital download single. It was later revealed to be the first single from his eighth studio album, W:/2016Album/.

== Background ==
In April 2016, Zimmerman uploaded "Snowcone" to his SoundCloud account. In May 2016, his account was hacked. After attempting to regain control of the account and receiving poor customer support, the account and all of its tracks were removed from the service. Shortly afterwards, "Snowcone" was released.

"Snowcone" is Zimmerman's first single to be independently released on Mau5trap, exclusive to digital download. After the track listing for Zimmerman's eighth studio album, W:/2016Album/, was leaked on Reddit, "Snowcone" was revealed to be the first single for the then-upcoming album. This was followed by the release of "Let Go".

The song was included on Billboard's list of The 20 Best Deadmau5 Songs, placed at number 17.

== Track listing ==
Track listing taken from iTunes.

Digital download
| No. | Title | Length |
|---|---|---|
| 1. | "Snowcone" | 5:14 |

== Charts ==
| Chart | Peak position |
|---|---|
| US Dance/Electronic Digital Songs (Billboard) | 40 |

== Release history ==
| Country | Date | Format | Label |
|---|---|---|---|
| Worldwide | May 27, 2016 | Digital download | Mau5trap |
