= Faxing Berlin =

Single by Deadmau5

from the album Random Album Title
- B-side: "Jaded"
- Released: October 25, 2006
- Recorded: 2006
- Genre: Progressive house, trance
- Length: 8:41 (original mix)
- Label: Mau5trap; Play; Cinnamon Flava
- Songwriter: Joel Zimmerman
- Producer: Deadmau5

Deadmau5 singles chronology
"Faxing Berlin" (2006)	"Not Exactly" (2007)

"Faxing Berlin" is an instrumental by Canadian electronic music producer Deadmau5. It was released as Deadmau5's debut single and is from his third studio album Random Album Title. On July 23, 2007, "Faxing Berlin" became the first release on Deadmau5's label Mau5trap. The track was originally known as "Da Outer Limits", but was renamed to "Faxing Berlin" later on, during a phone call with Max Graham, when Graham left "to fax [something] over to Berlin".

== Composition ==
"Faxing Berlin" is a progressive house song with a tempo of 128 beats per minute and is written in the key of D minor.

== Controversy ==
In 2008, an artist called DirtyCircuit claimed to have been threatened with legal action after using the sample "LP_Faxing Berlin C_128bpm" that came bundled with FL Studio, which Deadmau5 claimed copyright for. The sample was a direct clip of a full bar of the song. Deadmau5 provided a demo track that came bundled with FL Studio, along with several loop samples. The case caused a slight discomfort among the users of FL Studio, some of which have pointed out potential inconsistencies in the EULA of the software. The sample, along with other uncleared melody samples, were later removed.

== Formats and track listings ==
Digital download – Faxing Berlin
No.	Title	Length
1.	"Faxing Berlin"	8:45

Digital download – Faxing Berlin / Jaded
No.	Title	Length
1.	"Faxing Berlin" (Original Mix)	8:41
2.	"Faxing Berlin" (Chris Lake Edit)	8:13
3.	"Jaded" (Original Mix)	8:54
4.	"Jaded" (Ambient Intro Mix)	4:10

Vinyl
No.	Title	Length
1.	"Faxing Berlin" (Chris Lake Edit)	8:13
2.	"Jaded"	8:54

== Chart performance ==
Following the release of Random Album Title, "Faxing Berlin" entered the Hot Dance Club Songs chart at number 50 on March 3, 2009, and stayed on the chart for 12 more weeks, peaking at number 6.

Chart performance for "Faxing Berlin"
Chart (2009)	Peak position
US Dance Club Songs (Billboard)	6

== Release history ==
Release history for "Faxing Berlin"
Country	Date	Format	Label
Canada	October 25, 2006	Digital download	Play Digital
Canada	July 23, 2007	Digital download	Mau5trap
United Kingdom	August 2, 2007	12" vinyl	Mau5trap
Italy	November 4, 2007	12" vinyl	Cinnamon Flava
