= Meowingtons Hax Tour Trax =

Compilation album by mau5trap
- Released: 25 August 2011
- Recorded: 2011
- Length: 66:04
- Label: Mau5trap; Ultra (US/Canada); Virgin (Worldwide)

Singles from Meowingtons Hax Tour Trax
- 1. "Where My Keys" Released: August 25, 2011

Meowingtons Hax Tour Trax is a compilation album by artists who are signed to deadmau5's record label, mau5trap. It was made to promote the artists and his Meowingtons Hax Tour, which was named after his cat, Professor Meowingtons. Despite the name, only one of the tracks on the album is by deadmau5, and the rest are by other artists, including Skrillex, Moguai, Excision and Feed Me.

The Beatport edition of this album contains remix stems of both "Blast Wave" by Al Bizzare and "Deviance" by Excision and Datsik, both which are tracks on the album. "Where My Keys" was omitted.

== Track listing ==
No.	Title	Artists(s)	Length
1.	"Where My Keys"	deadmau5	6:52
2.	"Cott's Face"	Feed Me	5:56
3.	"Static"	Tommy Lee and DJ Aero	4:18
4.	"LFO Tool"	Tommy Lee and DJ Aero	5:23
5.	"Deviance"	Excision and Datsik	4:32
6.	"Scary Monsters and Nice Sprites" (Zedd Remix)	Skrillex	5:57
7.	"Beat of the Drum" (Club Mix) (featuring SOFI)	Moguai	7:19
8.	"U Turn"	James Njie	9:32
9.	"Anti Crisis"	James Njie	7:24
10.	"Blast Wave"	Al Bizzare	6:51
