= Let Go (Deadmau5 song) =

Single by Deadmau5 featuring Grabbitz

from the album W:/2016Album/
- Released: November 18, 2016
- Genre: Progressive house
- Length: 6:18; 11:32 (extended edit)
- Label: Mau5trap
- Songwriter(s): Joel Zimmerman, Nicholas Chiari
- Producer(s): Deadmau5

Deadmau5 singles chronology
"Saved" (2016)	"Let Go" (2016)	"Legendary" (2017)

Grabbitz singles chronology
"Follow Me" (2016)	"Let Go" (2016)	"In the Winter" (2017)

Music video
- Let Go on YouTube

"Let Go" is a song by Canadian electronic music producer Deadmau5, featuring vocals from American producer Grabbitz. It was released as the second and final single from his eighth studio album W:/2016Album/. It was released exclusively on his record label Mau5trap on November 18, 2016.

== Background ==
The production started when Grabbitz made a vocal bootleg version of the While(1<2) track "Silent Picture" almost two weeks after its original release. Zimmerman was impressed with the vocal edit, claiming on Twitter that he wanted to finish it (similar to how he found Chris James' vocals for "The Veldt").

Zimmerman then produced a demo of "Let Go" titled "aaddsfffsfsf" in 2015, and uploaded it to his website. However, Zimmerman later cancelled development of "aaddsfffsfsf" and its melody was later turned into a royalty free MIDI file after being put in his Chimaera pack sold by Splice in April 2016. It was renamed to "Fanaus" for release as a MIDI file in the pack. However, the project was revised over time and a new demo was uploaded to Zimmerman's SoundCloud account (prior to it being compromised) titled "Blood for the Bloodgoat".

The track was originally unreleased until a fan suggested for him to release the track on his then-upcoming album, W:/2016Album/. For the album's release, the track was given a shorter - 6 minute edit, renamed to its final title and released in late 2016 as an album pre-order single.

In 2017, Grabbitz released an edit of "Let Go" on mau5trap's 2017 compilation album We Are Friends, Vol. 7. This version is based on the original "Silent Picture" demo.

== Music video ==
A video for "Let Go" was released on deadmau5's official YouTube channel on December 16, 2016. The video showcased and promoted Zimmerman's stage set (dubbed "Cube 2.1") for his then upcoming tour, "Lots of Shows in a Row". The video was filmed in partnership with Mau5trap and TAIT Towers.

== Track listing ==
Digital download
No.	Title	Length
1.	"Let Go (Original Mix)" (featuring Grabbitz)	6:18

== Charts ==
Chart	Peak position
US Hot Dance/Electronic Songs (Billboard)	11

== Release history ==
Country	Date	Format	Label
Worldwide	November 18, 2016	Digital download	Mau5trap
