= Maths (instrumental) =

Single by Deadmau5

from the album Album Title Goes Here
- Released: February 17, 2012
- Recorded: 2010–2011
- Genre: Electro house, complextro
- Length: 6:52
- Label: Mau5trap, Ultra
- Songwriter(s): Joel Zimmerman
- Producer(s): Deadmau5

Deadmau5 singles chronology
"Aural Psynapse" (2011)	"Maths" (2012)	"The Veldt" (2012)

"Maths" is an instrumental by Canadian electronic music producer Deadmau5. It was released as the first single from his sixth studio album Album Title Goes Here.

== Background ==
An unfinished version of the song appeared in 2010. Originally intended to be the twelfth track from his fifth studio album, 4×4=12, it was omitted due to Zimmerman not being able to finish it in time. It later appeared in a YouTube video called "drowned rat", which showed Zimmerman on a water scooter in Lake Ontario, recorded via a helmet camera. It was uploaded on June 1, 2011, and scored large popularity after being uploaded.

It was played throughout the Meowingtons Hax Tour, and then released on February 17, 2012.

== Music video ==
The music video for "Maths" was released on February 23, 2012. The video consisted of a quotation board displaying a loop of various mathematical symbols and expressions. The text changes throughout the video, though recurring things as "__MATHS___", "_DEADMAU5_", and "><><><" are often displayed. deadmau5 later explained on a Facebook post that the video is indeed unofficial, and that "someone over at the label just chucked this together and uploaded it without running it by anyone".

== Chart performance ==
Chart performance for "Maths"
Chart (2012)	Peak position
UK Indie (OCC)	41
UK Dance (OCC)	31
US Dance/Electronic Digital Songs (Billboard)	20
