= Not Exactly =

Single by Deadmau5

from the album Random Album Title
- B-side: "We Fail"
- Released: August 27, 2007
- Genre: Progressive house, ambient house
- Length: 9:15 (original mix)
- Label: Mau5trap
- Songwriter: Joel Zimmerman
- Producer: Deadmau5

Deadmau5 singles chronology
"Faxing Berlin" (2006)	"Not Exactly" (2007)	"Arguru" (2007)

"Not Exactly" is an instrumental by Canadian electronic music producer Deadmau5. It was released as the second single from his third studio album, Random Album Title. First released on August 27, 2007, "Not Exactly" became the second release on Deadmau5's label Mau5trap.

== Background and composition ==
"Not Exactly" is a progressive house song with a tempo of 128 beats per minute and is written in the key of F major.

The single charted in the US Dance/Electronic Digital Song Sales Chart two years after its release, peaking at position #46. The song also won the Beatport Music Award for "Best Single" in 2008.

== Formats and track listings ==
Digital download / 12" – Single
No.	Title	Length
1.	"Not Exactly"	9:15
2.	"We Fail"	6:30

12" – Remixes
No.	Title	Length
1.	"Not Exactly" (Peter Gelderblom Remix)	7:39
2.	"Not Exactly" (Trick & Kubic Remix)	6:15
3.	"Not Exactly" (Jean Claude Ades Hypnotic Remix)	8:46
4.	"Not Exactly" (Major North Reprise)	7:31

Digital download – Remixes
No.	Title	Length
1.	"Not Exactly" (Peter Gelderblom Remix)	7:39
2.	"Not Exactly" (Trick & Kubic Remix)	6:15
3.	"Not Exactly" (Jean Claude Ades Hypnotic Remix)	8:46
4.	"Not Exactly" (Major North Reprise)	7:31
5.	"Not Exactly" (Talla 2XLC Trance Rework)	6:08

== Charts ==
Chart performance for "Not Exactly"
Chart (2010)	Peak position
US Dance/Electronic Digital Song Sales (Billboard)	46

== Release history ==
Release history and formats for "Not Exactly"
Country	Date	Format	Label
Canada	August 27, 2007	Digital download	Mau5trap
United Kingdom	August 27, 2007	12" vinyl	Mau5trap
Italy	October 22, 2007	12" vinyl	Cinnamon Flava
Germany	December 2007	12" vinyl	Electric
Germany	February 2008	12" vinyl	Electric
Germany	March 10, 2008	Digital download	Electric
United States	April 12, 2011	Digital download	Ultra
