= Avaritia (instrumental) =

Single by Deadmau5

from the album While(1<2)
- Released: 20 May 2014
- Recorded: 2013
- Genre: Progressive house; electro house
- Length: 6:43
- Label: Mau5trap; Astralwerks; Virgin EMI
- Songwriter: Joel Zimmerman
- Producer: Deadmau5

Deadmau5 singles chronology
"Suckfest9001" (2013)	"Avaritia" (2014)	"Seeya" (2014)

"Avaritia" is an instrumental song by Canadian electronic music producer Deadmau5. It was released as the lead single from his seventh studio album While(1<2) on 20 May 2014.

== Background ==
On 8 October 2013, a piano track titled "Avaritia" was uploaded to Zimmerman's SoundCloud account, along with the rest of the 7 EP. The seven piano-only tracks were each named after the seven deadly sins in Latin ("Acedia", "Avaritia", "Gula", "Invidia", "Ira", "Luxuria" and "Superbia"). All titles except "Luxuria" appear on the 2014 album. However, the melody of "Luxuria" was later tweaked into "Somewhere Up Here". "Luxuria" is also played in the background of "Coelacanth II". Of the 6 titles, "Gula", "Acedia" and "Avaritia" were edited from fully piano and includes elements of dance music, though Avaritia's original melody isn't featured on the track of the same name on the album.

The track was originally combined with another song by him titled "Phantoms Can't Hang", and was released on his SoundCloud page prior to it being compromised, where it was titled "Where Phantoms Sleep 04" - before the two were separated into individual tracks.

In 2018, Deadmau5 and Gregory Reveret recorded an orchestral rendition of "Avaritia" for the album Where's the Drop?. However, this time the original composition from the 7 EP was used, instead of the dance rework from While(1<2).

== Release ==
The song was released on 20 May 2014, alongside the iTunes pre-order for While(1<2). People who pre-ordered would be able to download the single for free. "Avaritia" was also made available for download on Beatport.

== Chart positions ==
Chart (2014)	Peak position
Canada Hot 100 (Billboard)	92
UK Dance (OCC)	26
UK Singles (Official Charts Company)	121
US Hot Dance/Electronic Songs (Billboard)	22
