= The Veldt (song) =

Single by Deadmau5 featuring Chris James

from the album Album Title Goes Here
- Released: 8 May 2012
- Recorded: 17–18 March 2012
- Genre: Progressive house, ambient house
- Length: 11:40 (original mix); 8:40 (8-minute edit); 2:50 (radio edit)
- Label: mau5trap; Ultra (US/Canada); EMI (rest of world)
- Songwriters: Joel Zimmerman, Chris James
- Producer: deadmau5

deadmau5 singles chronology
"Maths" (2012)	"The Veldt" (2012)	"Professional Griefers" (2012)

Chris James singles chronology
"Totally Worth It" (2012)	"The Veldt" (2012)	"Together We Are" (2013)

Music video
- "The Veldt" on YouTube

The Veldt EP

"The Veldt" is a song by Canadian electronic music producer Deadmau5 and Chris James, who wrote the lyrics and the vocal melody and contributed the vocals. The song ranked number 48 on Rolling Stone's list of the 50 best songs of 2012.

== Background and composition ==
"The Veldt" was inspired by the 1950 short story of the same name by Ray Bradbury. The song was initially created during a 22-hour live streaming session in March 2012. The following day, Zimmerman (Deadmau5) found Chris James, who created his own vocal rendition of the song, via Twitter. Zimmerman was impressed with James' vocals, particularly with the lyrical references to the Ray Bradbury story, and confirmed that the official release of the song would include James' vocals. The song's production was captured on a live streaming session via his official website.

"The Veldt" is a progressive house song with a tempo of 128 beats per minute and is written in the key of A major.

== Release ==
On April 20, 2012, Zimmerman and Ultra Records uploaded the eight minute-plus version of the song onto their YouTube channels, with the radio edit being uploaded onto Ultra Records' channel on May 7, 2012. Both versions of the song were released the following day.

The Veldt EP was released on June 24, 2012, and includes the eleven minute-plus original mix of the song, remixes by Freeform Five and Tommy Trash and an original song called "Failbait" featuring Cypress Hill. The original mix of "The Veldt" features a tribal drum intro.

The song was included on the album Album Title Goes Here released late September 2012, in an again slightly differently mixed eight-minute version. The tribal drum intro of the original mix has been left out in this version. The track "Failbait" from The Veldt EP was included on the album as well.

The song was also used during rallies for Justin Trudeau's campaign to become the Canadian Liberal Party Leader, and eventually Prime Minister of Canada.

The title of the song served as inspiration for the name of VELD, an annual musical festival in Toronto that inaugurated in 2012 a few months after the song's release.

== Music video ==
An official music video was posted to Zimmerman's official YouTube page on June 25, 2012. It was produced by Qudos Animations.

As with the song, the video is based on the short story "The Veldt" by Ray Bradbury. It shows two children entering "The Nursery", and running through a savannah landscape with lions and vultures eating bloody dead remains. They stop, and the boy begins to climb up a small mountain. He then suddenly finds his sister standing on the edge of a precipice. He then approaches her and, after pushing her off the edge, jumps off. They slide down the ledge and meet at the ground. The video ends with the two children holding hands as a lion walks off in the distance, leaving behind broken glasses and a trail of blood, presumably of their parents. The video is dedicated to Bradbury, who died weeks before the video was published.

== Track listing ==
Digital download – Single
No.	Title	Length
1.	"The Veldt" (Radio Edit)	2:50
2.	"The Veldt" (8 Minute Edit)	8:39

Digital download – EP
No.	Title	Length
1.	"The Veldt" (featuring Chris James) (Original Mix)	11:34
2.	"Failbait" (featuring Cypress Hill) (Original Mix)	4:49
3.	"The Veldt" (featuring Chris James) (Freeform Five Remix)	3:11
4.	"The Veldt" (featuring Chris James) (Tommy Trash Remix)	6:52

== Charts ==
=== Weekly charts ===
Chart (2012)	Peak position
Belgium (Ultratip Bubbling Under Flanders)	35
Belgium (Ultratip Bubbling Under Wallonia)	19
Canada Hot 100 (Billboard)	24
Canada CHR/Top 40 (Billboard)	13
Canada Hot AC (Billboard)	27
France (SNEP)	149
Ireland (IRMA)	31
Netherlands (Single Top 100)	63
Switzerland (Schweizer Hitparade)	68
UK Singles (Official Charts)	68
UK Dance (Official Charts)	16
US Hot Dance Club Songs (Billboard)	43
US Hot Dance/Electronic Songs (Billboard)	5

=== Year-end charts ===
Chart (2012)	Position
Canada (Canadian Hot 100)	75

== Release history ==
Region	Date	Format	Label
Worldwide (except U.S. & Canada)	8 May 2012	Digital download	EMI, Mau5trap
U.S. & Canada	8 May 2012	Digital download	Ultra Records
