= Album Title Goes Here =

2016 studio album by Deadmau5

Studio album by Deadmau5
- Released: September 21, 2012
- Recorded: 2007–2012
- Genres: Progressive house; electro house; glitch; trip hop; ambient
- Length: 79:53 (physical version); 82:07 (digital version)
- Labels: Ultra; Mau5trap; Parlophone
- Producer: Joel Zimmerman

Deadmau5 chronology
4×4=12 (2010)	Album Title Goes Here (2012)	While(1<2) (2014)

Singles from Album Title Goes Here
- 1. "Maths" Released: February 17, 2012; 2. "The Veldt" Released: May 8, 2012; 3. "Professional Griefers" Released: August 14, 2012; 4. "Channel 42" Released: February 10, 2013; 5. "Telemiscommunications" Released: March 12, 2013

Album Title Goes Here (stylized as > album title goes here <) is the sixth studio album by Canadian electronic music producer Deadmau5, released on September 21, 2012 by Mau5trap and Ultra Records in the United States and Canada and by Parlophone Records in the United Kingdom. The album is considered to be more experimental than Zimmerman's previous albums (such as 4×4=12), and he stated in an interview with Fuse that he had been considering producing music similar to his debut album Get Scraped again. It is the last studio album by Zimmerman to be released by Ultra Records, as well as his only album to be released by Parlophone.

Album Title Goes Here spawned five singles: "Maths", "The Veldt", "Professional Griefers", "Channel 42" and "Telemiscommunications". The album received a nomination for Best Dance/Electronica Album at the 55th Grammy Awards.

== Background ==
In a livestream on Ustream, Zimmerman said that the track "Sleepless" was supposed to contain the vocals he had recorded, but he claimed to have accidentally submitted the wrong file without the vocals. This led to the instrumental version of the song to appear on the final version of the album.

== Release and promotion ==
A music video for "Channel 42" was uploaded to Zimmerman's YouTube account on February 12, 2013. The video was recorded during the November 28, 2012, performance in London, UK, promoting the Nokia Lumia 920.

A music video directed by Paul Boyd was released for "Professional Griefers", which featured both Deadmau5 and Gerard Way, and was promoted by Ultimate Fighting Championship (UFC). A fully animated music video for "The Veldt" made by Qudos Animations was released on 25 June 2012.

== Reception ==
Professional ratings
Aggregate scores
Source	Rating
Metacritic	59/100
Review scores
Source	Rating
AllMusic	3/5 stars
Consequence of Sound	3.5/5 stars
The Guardian	2/5 stars
Mixmag	4/5 stars
Now	3/5 stars
Paste	8.5/10
PopMatters	6/10
Rolling Stone	3/5 stars
Spin	5/10
Sputnikmusic	2.0/5

At Metacritic, which assigns a weighted mean rating out of 100 to reviews from mainstream critics, Album Title Goes Here received an average score of 59, based on 13 reviews, indicating "mixed or average reviews". Some critics commended the album's collaborations and excellent production value, but others criticized its lack of creativity.

== Commercial performance ==
The album debuted at number two on the Canadian Albums Chart with first-week sales of 13,000 copies.

Selling 58,000 copies in the United States in its first week, Album Title Goes Here debuted at number six on the Billboard 200 and at number one on the Dance/Electronic Albums chart, becoming deadmau5's first number-one album on the latter chart. It entered the UK Albums Chart at number nine on sales of 14,325 units, his highest-charting album in the United Kingdom to date.

== Legacy ==
The track "Superliminal" was featured in Season 20 Episode 4 of Top Gear where Jeremy Clarkson drives a Mercedes-Benz SLS AMG Electric Drive. The track “Professional Griefers" was featured in Asphalt 8: Airborne & FIFA 13. The track "Channel 42" was featured in Need for Speed: Most Wanted.

== Track listing ==
CD
No.	Title	Length
1.	"Superliminal"	6:15
2.	"Channel 42" (with Wolfgang Gartner)	4:48
3.	"The Veldt (8 Minute Edit)" (featuring Chris James)	8:25
4.	"Fn Pig"	8:42
5.	"Professional Griefers" (featuring Gerard Way)	4:04
6.	"Maths"	6:38
7.	"There Might Be Coffee"	7:00
8.	"Take Care of the Proper Paperwork"	6:52
9.	"Closer"	6:58
10.	"October"	7:10
11.	"Sleepless"	4:06
12.	"Failbait" (featuring Cypress Hill)	4:49
13.	"Telemiscommunications" (with Imogen Heap)	4:03
Total length:		79:53

Digital download
No.	Title	Length
1.	"Superliminal"	6:33
2.	"Channel 42" (with Wolfgang Gartner)	4:51
3.	"The Veldt (8 Minute Edit)" (featuring Chris James)	8:41
4.	"Fn Pig"	8:52
5.	"Professional Griefers" (featuring Gerard Way)	4:06
6.	"Maths"	6:54
7.	"There Might Be Coffee"	7:03
8.	"Take Care of the Proper Paperwork"	7:13
9.	"Closer"	7:12
10.	"October"	7:23
11.	"Sleepless"	4:15
12.	"Failbait" (featuring Cypress Hill)	4:51
13.	"Telemiscommunications" (with Imogen Heap)	4:07
Total length:		82:07

iTunes bonus tracks
No.	Title	Length
14.	"Strobe (live version)"	4:55
15.	"The Veldt (Tommy Trash remix)" (featuring Chris James)	6:45
16.	"Professional Griefers (radio edit)" (featuring Gerard Way)	3:02
17.	"The Veldt" (featuring Chris James, music video)	2:54
18.	"Professional Griefers" (featuring Gerard Way, music video)	5:33
Total length:		105:19

Limited edition bonus CD (> extra <)
No.	Title	Length
1.	"Professional Griefers (instrumental mix)"	6:27
2.	"Professional Griefers (radio edit)" (featuring Gerard Way)	3:03
3.	"The Veldt (Tommy Trash remix)" (featuring Chris James)	6:50
4.	"The Veldt (Freeform Five remix)" (featuring Chris James)	3:12
5.	"Strobe (live version)"	4:57
Total length:		104:18

Spotify bonus tracks
No.	Title	Length
1.	"Creep"	6:19
Total length:		86:12

== Charts ==
=== Weekly charts ===
Chart (2012)	Peak position
Australian Albums (ARIA)	11
Austrian Albums (Ö3 Austria)	24
Belgian Albums (Ultratop Flanders)	22
Belgian Albums (Ultratop Wallonia)	35
Canadian Albums (Billboard)	2
Danish Albums (Hitlisten)	15
Dutch Albums (Album Top 100)	16
Finnish Albums (Suomen virallinen lista)	31
French Albums (SNEP)	51
German Albums (Offizielle Top 100)	39
Irish Albums (IRMA)	6
Italian Albums (FIMI)	26
New Zealand Albums (RMNZ)	17
Norwegian Albums (VG-lista)	26
Scottish Albums (Official Charts)	6
Spanish Albums (Promusicae)	85
Swiss Albums (Schweizer Hitparade)	18
UK Albums (Official Charts)	9
UK Dance Albums (Official Charts)	1
US Billboard 200	6
US Top Dance Albums (Billboard)	1
US Independent Albums (Billboard)	2

=== Year-end charts ===
Chart (2012)	Position
Australian Dance Albums (ARIA)	37
US Top Dance/Electronic Albums (Billboard)	11
US Independent Albums (Billboard)	29

Chart (2013)	Position
US Top Dance/Electronic Albums (Billboard)	12
US Independent Albums (Billboard)	47

== Certifications ==
Region	Certification	Certified units/sales
Canada (Music Canada)	Gold	40,000^{^}
^{^} Shipments figures based on certification alone.

== Release history ==
Region	Date	Label
Australia	21 September 2012	EMI
Germany	21 September 2012	EMI
Ireland	21 September 2012	mau5trap, Parlophone
United Kingdom	24 September 2012	mau5trap, Parlophone
France	24 September 2012	EMI Music Publishing
Canada	25 September 2012	mau5trap, Ultra Records
United States	25 September 2012	mau5trap, Ultra Records
Japan	26 September 2012	EMI
