= While(1 Is Less Than 2) =

While(1<2)

Studio album by Deadmau5
- Released: June 17, 2014
- Recorded: 2006–2014
- Genres: Progressive house; electro house; ambient; downtempo; experimental
- Length: 130:53 (mixed); 139:17 (unmixed)
- Labels: Mau5trap; Astralwerks; Virgin EMI
- Producer: Joel Zimmerman

Deadmau5 chronology
Album Title Goes Here (2012)	While(1<2) (2014)	5 Years of Mau5 (2014)

Singles from While(1<2)
- 1. "Avaritia" Released: 20 May 2014; 2. "Seeya" Released: 27 May 2014; 3. "Infra Turbo Pigcart Racer" Released: 3 June 2014; 4. "Phantoms Can't Hang" Released: 10 June 2014

While(1<2) (stylized in all lowercase; pronounced "while one is less than two") is the seventh studio album by Canadian electronic music producer Deadmau5, released on June 17, 2014 by Mau5trap, Virgin EMI and Astralwerks, his only album to be released by the latter.

The album is a notable departure from the bass-heavy, upbeat template of his previous work, instead foraying in a more experimental direction, with tones of downtempo and ambient music. Many of the songs on the album were originally uploaded to Deadmau5's SoundCloud account before they were removed from the site in early 2014.

The album received a positive reception from critics, who applauded its experimental nature, although some viewed this as its weak point. It peaked at number 9 on the Billboard 200, becoming his second top-ten album.

== Background ==
On January 7, 2014, Deadmau5 announced on Twitter that his seventh album was completed. He also announced that it was a double album containing a continuous mix for each disc and that the album as a whole, minus the mixes, would contain 25 tracks. On May 10, 2014, While(1<2) was officially unveiled by Deadmau5 through his subscription service, and also announced the album's digital release date of June 17, 2014 with a physical release on June 24.

The title is a piece of code, which would always evaluate to true (as 1 is always less than 2); thus, as "deadmau5" happens "while 1 is less than 2", the album is supposed to be infinitely persisting.

== Singles ==
The first single "Avaritia" became available for purchase on May 20, 2014. One week later, the second single "Seeya", featuring singer Colleen D'Agostino from the band The Material, was made available for purchase on iTunes. On 2 June 2014, the third single "Infra Turbo Pigcart Racer" premiered on Mau5trap's SoundCloud page. It was made available for download on iTunes and Beatport the next day. The album's fourth and final single, "Phantoms Can't Hang", was also premiered through SoundCloud the day before its release on iTunes and Beatport which was on 10 June 2014.

== Critical reception ==
Professional ratings
Aggregate scores
Source	Rating
Metacritic	66/100
Review scores
Source	Rating
AllMusic	3.5/5 stars
Billboard	4.5/5 stars
Consequence of Sound	B
Los Angeles Times	3/4 stars
The National	2/5 stars
Q	3/5 stars
Rolling Stone	2/5 stars
Slant Magazine	2/5 stars
Spin	8/10

While(1<2) received favorable reviews from critics. It currently holds a score of 66 on Metacritic, indicating "generally favourable reviews". Billboard gave the album 4.5/5 stars stating "Sprawling, ambitious and mostly well-executed, "While(1<2) may confuse his fan base's Ultra-attending electro house contingent, but Deadmau5's double album undoubtedly marks his most mature and forward-thinking release to date". AllMusic also reviewed positively expressing "While(1<2) is a very good, very restrained, and very inspired Deadmau5 effort. It is a welcome space-walk surprise, recommended for all aspiring EDM astronauts and Ghost in the Shell cast members", with a score of 3.5/5 stars.

Rolling Stone was more critical of the album, stating "Deadmau5 has turned from an electro-house polymath into the world's most unnecessary Nine Inch Nails tribute act", giving it 2 stars out of 5. Slant Magazine was equally critical saying "Deadmau5 enters the fray with the advantage of deeply diminished expectations. His latest, While(1<2), comfortably clears the bar set by his contemporaries, and that would be impressive if the bar wasn't buried underground", also awarding it 2 stars.

== Track listing ==
All tracks are written by Joel Zimmerman, except where noted.

Disc 1
No.	Title	Writer(s)	Length
1.	"Avaritia"		6:42
2.	"Coelacanth I"		2:46
3.	"Ice Age" (deadmau5 Remix) (by How to Destroy Angels)	Trent Reznor; Atticus Ross; Mariqueen Reznor	6:51
4.	"My Pet Coelacanth"		8:15
5.	"Infra Turbo Pigcart Racer"		9:36
6.	"Terrors in My Head"		8:37
7.	"Creep"		5:37
8.	"Somewhere Up Here"		5:10
9.	"Phantoms Can't Hang"		9:15
10.	"Gula"		6:56
Total length:			69:46

Disc 2
No.	Title	Writer(s)	Length
1.	"Acedia"		6:25
2.	"Invidia"		3:16
3.	"Errors in My Bread"		5:17
4.	"Survivalism" (deadmau5 Remix) (by Nine Inch Nails)	Reznor; Ross	3:37
5.	"Silent Picture"		3:38
6.	"Rlyehs Lament"		4:48
7.	"Superbia"		2:14
8.	"Mercedes"		9:38
9.	"Bleed"		4:00
10.	"Ira"		2:38
11.	"Monday"		3:45
12.	"A Moment to Myself"		3:28
13.	"Pets"		7:31
14.	"Coelacanth II"		2:36
15.	"Seeya" (featuring Colleen D'Agostino)	Colleen D'Agostino; Joel Zimmerman	6:40
Total length:			69:31

Disc 2 bonus track
No.	Title	Length
16.	"Petting Zoo"	7:31
Total length:		77:02

Digital bonus tracks (mixed)
No.	Title	Length
1.	"while(1<2) [disc 1]"	1:07:12
2.	"while(1<2) [disc 2]"	1:03:41
Total length:		2:10:53

Note

- Some physical copies of the album, including the vinyl version, feature the full version of "Infra Turbo Pigcart Racer", which is 10:36. The promotional single for the song also features this full version.

== Charts ==
=== Weekly charts ===
Weekly chart performance for While(1<2)
Chart (2014)	Peak position
Australian Albums (ARIA)	9
Australian Dance Albums (ARIA)	2
Austrian Albums (Ö3 Austria)	36
Belgian Albums (Ultratop Flanders)	36
Belgian Albums (Ultratop Wallonia)	52
Canadian Albums (Billboard)	5
Danish Albums (Hitlisten)	25
Dutch Albums (Album Top 100)	36
French Albums (SNEP)	165
German Albums (Offizielle Top 100)	31
Irish Albums (IRMA)	25
Italian Albums (FIMI)	52
New Zealand Albums (RMNZ)	25
Scottish Albums (Official Charts)	13
Swiss Albums (Schweizer Hitparade)	25
UK Albums (Official Charts)	14
UK Dance Albums (Official Charts)	1
US Billboard 200	9
US Top Dance Albums (Billboard)	1

=== Year-end charts ===
Year-end chart performance for While(1<2)
Chart (2014)	Position
US Dance/Electronic Albums (Billboard)	9

== Release history ==
Release history for While(1<2)
Region	Date	Format	Label
Various	17 June 2014	Digital download	Mau5trap, Astralwerks, Virgin
Various	24 June 2014	CD	Mau5trap, Astralwerks, Virgin
Various	July 2014	Vinyl	Mau5trap, Astralwerks, Virgin
