= Kaskade discography =

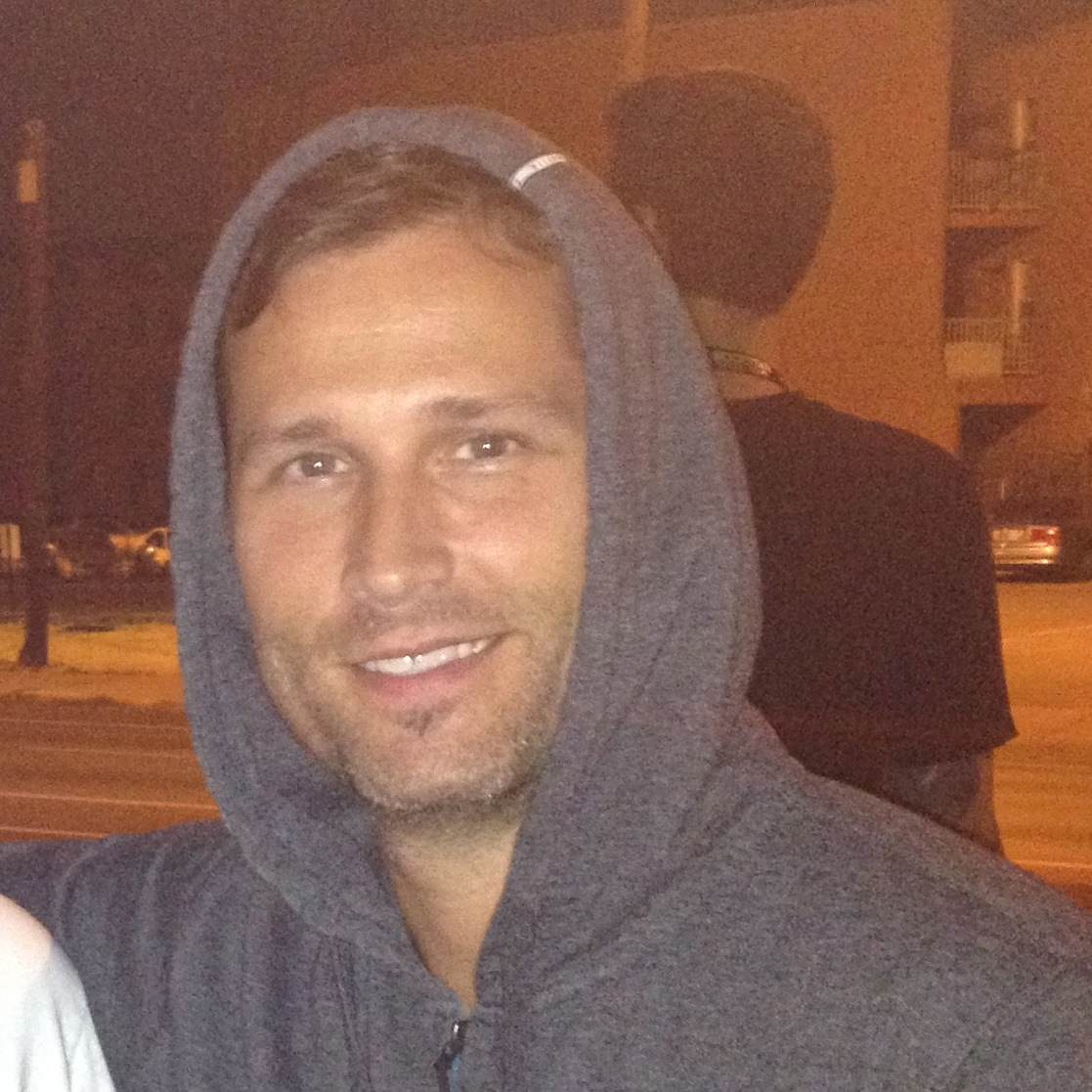
- Kaskade in Indianapolis, Indiana in 2012.
- Studio albums: 10
- Compilation albums: 3
- Singles: 54
- Mix albums: 7

American house DJ and electronic dance music producer Kaskade has released ten studio albums, three compilation albums, 54 singles, and seven mix albums.

== Albums ==
=== Studio albums ===
Title	Album details	Peak chart positions				
Title	Album details	US	US Dance	US Digital	US Indie	US Heat
It's You, It's Me	Released: March 18, 2003; Label: OM Records; Formats: CD, digital download	—	—	—	—	—
In the Moment	Released: May 18, 2004; Label: OM Records; Formats: CD, digital download	—	—	—	—	—
The Calm	Released: March 30, 2006; Label: Quiet City Recordings; Formats: CD, Digital download	—	—	—	—	—
Love Mysterious	Released: September 26, 2006; Label: Ultra Records; Formats: CD, digital download	—	18	—	—	—
Strobelite Seduction	Released: May 20, 2008; Label: Ultra Records; Formats: CD, digital download	—	7	—	36	12
Dynasty	Released: May 11, 2010; Label: Ultra Records; Formats: CD, digital download	104	4	13	17	1
Fire & Ice	Released: October 22, 2011; Label: Ultra Records; Formats: CD, digital download	17	1	6	3	—
Atmosphere	Released: September 10, 2013; Label: Ultra Records; Formats: CD, digital download	16	1	7	2	—
Automatic	Released: September 25, 2015; Label: Warner Bros. Records, Arkade; Formats: CD, digital download	25	2	11	—	—
Kaskade Christmas	Released: November 24, 2017; Label: Arkade; Formats: CD, digital download	—	8	—	—	—
Kx5 (with Deadmau5)	Released: March 17, 2023; Label: mau5trap, Arkade; Formats: CD, digital download	—	6	—	—	—
Undux	Released: December 4, 2025; Label: Monstercat, Arkade; Formats: Digital download	—	—	—	—	—
"—" denotes releases that did not chart or were not released in that territory.

=== Compilation albums ===
Title	Album details	Peak chart positions
Title	Album details	US Dance
Here & Now	Released: May 9, 2006; Label: Om; Formats: CD, digital download	—
The OM Remixes	Released: October 7, 2008; Label: Om; Formats: CD, digital download	—
I Remember	Released: July 22, 2014; Label: Ultra Records; Formats: CD, digital download	12
Arkade Destinations Tulum	Released: August 3, 2018; Label: Arkade; Formats: CD, digital download	—
"—" denotes items which were not released in that country or failed to chart.

=== DJ mix albums ===
Title	Album details	Peak chart positions	
Title	Album details	US	US Dance
Sounds of OM – 3rd Edition	Released: 2002; Label: Om; Formats: CD	—	—
San Francisco Sessions: V4 – Soundtrack to the Soul	Released: October 25, 2003; Label: Om; Formats: CD	—	—
House of OM	Released: 2005; Label: Om, digital download; Formats: CD	—	21
Bring the Night	Released: August 21, 2007; Label: Ultra; Formats: CD, digital download	—	15
The Grand	Released: March 24, 2009; Label: Ultra; Formats: CD, digital download	—	9
dance.love	Released: 2010; Label: Ultra; Formats: CD, digital download	190	4
Electric Daisy Carnival Volume 1	Released: August 17, 2010; Label: Ultra; Formats: CD, digital download	—	13
"—" denotes items which were not released in that country or failed to chart.

== Extended plays ==
- Redux EP 001 (2014)
- Redux EP 002 (2017)
- Redux EP 003 (2019)
- Redux EP 004 (2020)
- Reset (2021)
- Redux EP 005 (2021)
- Redux EP 006 (2023)

== Singles ==
Title	Year	Peak chart positions						Album
Title	Year	US	US Dance	US Club	CAN	NLD	UK	Album
"What I Say"	2001	—	—	—	—	—	—	It's You, It's Me
"Gonna Make It"	2001	—	—	—	—	—	—	It's You, It's Me
"I Feel Like"	2002	—	—	—	—	—	—	It's You, It's Me
"It's You, It's Me"	2003	—	—	—	—	—	—	It's You, It's Me
"True"	2004	—	—	—	—	—	—	Non-album singles
"Keep On"	2004	—	—	—	—	—	—	Non-album singles
"Steppin' Out"	2004	—	—	5	—	—	180	In the Moment
"Soundtrack to the Soul"	2004	—	—	—	—	—	137	In the Moment
"Sweet Love"	2004	—	—	—	—	—	—	In the Moment
"Everything"	2005	—	—	45	—	—	146	In the Moment
"Safe"	2005	—	—	—	—	—	—	Non-album single
"Be Still"	2006	—	—	10	—	—	—	Love Mysterious
"Stars Align"	2006	—	—	11	—	—	—	Love Mysterious
"In This Life"	2007	—	—	—	—	—	—	Love Mysterious
"Sorry"	2007	—	—	—	—	—	—	Love Mysterious
"Sometimes"	2007	—	—	—	—	—	—	Love Mysterious
"4 AM"	2008	—	—	—	—	—	—	Love Mysterious
"Move for Me" (with Deadmau5)	2008	—	—	—	66	—	190	Strobelite Seduction
"I Remember" (with Deadmau5)	2008	—	—	1	—	23	14	Random Album Title
"Angel on My Shoulder"	2008	—	—	49	—	—	—	Strobelite Seduction
"Step One Two"	2008	—	—	—	—	—	—	Strobelite Seduction
"So Far Away" (with Seamus Haji featuring Haley)	2009	—	—	—	—	—	—	Non-album single
"Dynasty" (featuring Haley)	2010	—	—	—	—	—	—	Dynasty
"Fire in Your New Shoes" (featuring Martina of Dragonette)	2010	—	—	—	69	—	—	Dynasty
"Don't Stop Dancing" (with EDX featuring Haley)	2010	—	—	—	—	—	—	Dynasty
"Raining" (with Adam K featuring Sunsun)	2010	—	—	—	—	—	—	Dance.love
"Only You" (with Tiësto featuring Haley)	2011	—	—	—	—	—	—	Dynasty
"All You"	2011	—	—	—	—	—	—	Love Mysterious
"All That You Give" (featuring Mindy Gledhill)	2011	—	—	—	—	—	—	Dynasty
"Call Out" (featuring Mindy Gledhill)	2011	—	—	—	—	—	—	Dynasty
"Eyes" (featuring Mindy Gledhill)	2011	—	—	—	—	—	—	Fire & Ice
"Turn It Down" (with Rebecca & Fiona)	2011	—	—	—	—	—	—	Fire & Ice
"Room for Happiness" (featuring Skylar Grey)	2012	—	—	—	—	—	—	Fire & Ice
"Lick It" (with Skrillex)	2012	—	—	—	—	—	—	Fire & Ice
"Lessons in Love" (featuring Neon Trees)	2012	94	25	—	—	27	—	Fire & Ice
"Llove" (featuring Haley)	2012	—	41	—	—	—	—	Fire & Ice
"No One Knows Who We Are" (with Swanky Tunes featuring Lights)	2012	—	34	—	—	—	—	Atmosphere
"Atmosphere"	2013	—	24	28	—	—	—	Atmosphere
"Last Chance" (with Project 46)	2013	—	25	—	—	—	—	Atmosphere
"Feeling the Night" (featuring Becky Jean Williams)	2013	—	49	—	—	—	—	Atmosphere
"Ain't Gotta Lie" (with deCarl)	2014	—	—	—	—	—	—	Redux EP
"Summer Nights" (with the Brocks)	2014	—	38	—	—	—	—	Non-album single
"A Little More" (with John Dahlbäck featuring Sansa)	2014	—	35	—	—	—	—	Automatic
"Never Sleep Alone" (featuring Tess Comrie)	2015	—	28	—	—	—	—	Automatic
"Disarm You" (featuring Ilsey)	2015	—	15	—	—	—	—	Automatic
"We Don't Stop"	2015	—	—	—	—	—	—	Automatic
"Whatever" (featuring KOLAJ)	2016	—	—	—	—	—	—	Automatic
"Us" (with CID)	2016	—	—	—	—	—	—	Automatic
"Fakin It" (with Felix Cartal featuring Ofelia K)	2016	—	26	—	—	—	—	Non-album singles
"Beneath with Me" (with Deadmau5 featuring Skylar Grey)	2016	—	—	—	—	—	—	Non-album singles
"Nobody Like You"	2017	—	35	—	—	—	—	Redux EP 002
"Deck the Halls"	2017	—	—	—	—	—	—	Kaskade Christmas
"Cold as Stone" (featuring Charlotte Lawrence)	2018	—	—	—	—	—	—	Non-album singles
"Almost Back" (with Phoebe Ryan and LöKii)	2018	—	48	—	—	—	—	Non-album singles
"Fun" (with Brohug and Mr. Tape)	2018	—	—	—	—	—	—	Non-album singles
"Tight" (featuring Madge)	2018	—	49	—	—	—	—	Non-album singles
"On Your Mind"	2018	—	32	—	—	—	—	Ninjawerks Volume 1
"Love Me Like You Used To" (with Cecilia Gault)	2019	—	—	—	—	—	—	Non-album single
"Be the One" (with Cheat Codes)	2019	—	—	—	—	—	—	Level 2
"Go Slow" (with Gorgon City and Roméo)	2019	—	22	1	—	—	—	Redux EP 003
"With You" (with Meghan Trainor)	2019	—	12	—	—	—	—	Non-album single
"No One Else" (with TELYKAST)	2019	—	—	—	—	—	—	Redux EP 003
"1990" (with Brohug)	2020	—	—	—	—	—	—	Non-album single
"Love Like That" (featuring Dani Poppitt)	2020	—	—	—	—	—	—	Redux EP 004
"Sexy" (with Kosha Dillz)	2020	—	—	—	—	—	—	Redux EP 004
"I Have Dreams" (featuring Blue Noir and Tishmal)	2020	—	—	—	—	—	—	Non-album singles
"Chains" (with Project 46)	2020	—	—	—	—	—	—	Non-album singles
"Pow Pow Pow" (with Chemical Surf)	2020	—	—	—	—	—	—	Non-album singles
"When I'm with You" (with Colette)	2020	—	—	—	—	—	—	Non-album singles
"When You're Dreaming" (with Finnstagram)	2020	—	—	—	—	—	—	Non-album singles
"Chains Chilled" (with Project 46)	2020	—	—	—	—	—	—	Non-album singles
"Haunt Me" (with the Moth & the Flame)	2020	—	—	—	—	—	—	Non-album singles
"Flip Reset" (with Will K)	2020	—	—	—	—	—	—	Reset EP
"Solid Ground"	2020	—	—	—	—	—	—	Reset EP
"Closer"	2021	—	—	—	—	—	—	Reset EP
"Miles to Go" (with Ella Vos)	2021	—	—	—	—	—	—	Reset EP
"Where Did You Go"	2021	—	—	—	—	—	—	Redux EP 005
"New James Dean" (with Tishmal)	2021	—	—	—	—	—	—	Redux EP 005
"Hot Wheels"	2021	—	—	—	—	—	—	Redux EP 005
"Hypnotized"	2021	—	—	—	—	—	—	Redux EP 005
"Escape" (as Kx5 with Deadmau5 featuring Hayla)	2022	—	11	—	—	—	—	Kx5
"Take Me High" (as Kx5 with Deadmau5)	2022	—	—	—	—	—	—	Kx5
"Alive" (as Kx5 with Deadmau5 featuring the Moth and the Flame)	2022	—	—	—	—	—	—	Kx5
"Avalanche" (as Kx5 with Deadmau5 featuring James French)	2022	—	—	—	—	—	—	Kx5
"Resonate" (with John Summit and Julia Church)	2024	—	43	—	—	—	—	Comfort in Chaos
"In My Head" (with Gryffin featuring Nu-La)	2025	—	—	—	—	—	—	Non-album singles
"Meet Again" (with Layton Giordani and Natalie Jane)	2026	—	24	—	—	—	—	Non-album singles
"—" denotes a recording that did not chart or was not released.

== Mashups ==
- All That Disaster - VS. Laidback Luke
- All You Joyenergizer - VS. Sander Van Doorn
- All You Paris - VS. David Guetta
- Angel on My MIAO Punk - VS. Thomas Gold & Ferry Corsten
- Angel on My Shoulder Reaver 76 - VS. Tiësto, Hardwell, EDX & Marco V.
- Angel on My Stronger - (Freaks of Nature Mashup) VS. Kelly Clarkson & Nicky Romero
- Be Still Avon - VS. Paris & Simo
- Be Still And Show Me Love - (DBN Mix) VS. Robin S.
- Be Still Big Bang - VS. Franz Novotny
- Be Still Ladi Dadi - (Freaks of Nature Mashup) VS. Steve Aoki & Tommy Trash
- Call Out Epic - VS. Sandro Silva & Quintino
- Chasing How It Is - VS. Tiesto, R3hab & Quintino
- Coming Home at 4 AM - VS. Diddy-Dirty Money ft. Skylar Grey
- Don't Stop Hells Bells - VS. Albin Myers
- Don't Stop Kissing - VS. Alex Gaudino
- Don't Stop Jumangee (Kaskade's Atmosphere Mash up) VS. Wayne & Woods & Henrix
- Dynasty Noise - VS. Dada Life
- Empty Streets Cascade - VS. Tommy Trash
- Empty Streets Solar End - VS. Nicky Romero & Tommy Trash
- Everything Artefact (Kaskade's Atmosphere Mash Up) VS. Florian Picasso
- Eyes Reloaded - VS. Sebastian Ingrosso & Tommy Trash
- Eyes Wherever You Go - VS. Swanky Tunes
- Falling in Love With Brazil - Haley VS. Deadmau5
- Fire in Your New Antidote - VS. Swedish House Mafia & Knife Party
- Fire in Your New Rage - VS. Deniz Koyu
- Hit it/No One Know Who We Are - VS. Deorro
- How Long Allein - (Freaks of Nature Mashup) VS. Eric Prydz
- I'll Never Dream I'm in Love - VS. Alex Gaudino
- In Common - with Alicia Keys
- Invisible 5 AM - Skylar Grey VS. Carl Louis & Martin Danielle & Thomas Sagstad
- It's You It's Hertz - VS. Deniz Koyu
- Lessons in Love - (Kaskade & Ken Loi Mashup) VS. Headhunterz & Promised Land
- Lessons Up In This - VS. Julian Jordan
- Louder Than Empty Streets - (Kaskade & Digital Lab Mash Up) VS. Afrojack & David Guetta
- Move For First Aid - VS. Michael Woods
- Move For Me The Legend - VS. Swanky Tunes & Matisse & Sadko
- Nufunk I'm Someone Else - (Deadmau5 Mix) VS. NuBreed
- Only You Flash - (Nicky Romero Mix) & Tiësto VS. Green Velvet
- Only You Tundra - VS. Paris & Simo, Merk & Kremont
- Please Say Quick Quack - VS. Patric la Funk & DBN
- Quasar 4 AM - VS. Hard Rock Sofa
- Room For Noise (Kaskade's EDC Chicago Mash Up) VS. Tiësto, Swanky Tunes & Dyro
- Something Something Champs - (Kaskade & ZZTTN) VS. Moguai
- Sorry Bom - VS. Avicii
- Sorry Monday - VS. Steve Angello
- Stars Align Tomorrow - (Digital Lab & Pedro Henrique DUB) VS. Dimitri Vegas, Like Mike & Dada Life
- Stars Align Tomorrow - VS. Dimitri Vegas & Like Mike & Dada Life
- Stars Troll - VS. Qulinez
- Step One For Redemption - VS. BDN & Menck
- Step One Two The Day Before - (Kaskade Remash) VS. Tommy Trash (feat. Location Location)
- Steppin' Out On Melancholy Hill (AN21 & Max Vangeli Mix) - VS. Gorillaz
- Steppin' Out Undertaker - VS. Wolfgang Gartner
- Summer Nights Bang Bang (Kaskade & The Brocks) - VS. Dada Life
- THIS Room For Happiness - VS. Sander van Doorn & Oliver Heldens
- Turn It Down Animals - VS. Martin Garrix
- Turn It Down Flashlight Bring the Voice - VS. R3hab, Deorro & Cobra Effects
- Turn It Down Toulouse - VS. Nicky Romero

== Remixes ==
- Above & Beyond - Love Is Not Enough (Kaskade Remix)
- Afro-Mystik - Natural (Kaskade Roots Remix)
- Alicia Keys - In Common (Kaskade Remix)
- Amma - Heartbeat (Kaskade Mix)
- Amma - On My Own (Kaskade Mix)
- Andy Caldwell - I Can't Wait (Kaskade Remix)
- Astrud Gilberto - Fly Me to the Moon (Kaskade Remix)
- The Beard featuring Phillipa - For Me (Kaskade Mix)
- Beyoncé - Run The World (Girls) (Kaskade Extended Mix) – No. 1 Billboard Hot Dance Club Play
- Bing Crosby - White Christmas (Kaskade Mix)
- Britney Spears - Break the Ice (Kaskade Remix) – No. 1 Billboard Hot Dance Play
- Britney Spears - Gimme More (Kaskade Remix) – No. 1 Billboard Hot Dance Club Play
- Britney Spears - Womanizer (Kaskade Remix) – No. 2 Billboard Hot Dance Airplay
- Cabin Crew - Can't Stop It (Kaskade Remix)
- Chieko Kinbara - If You Only (Kaskade Original Mix)
- Chieko Kinbara - Stay With Me (Kaskade Remix)
- Colette - Didn't Mean To Turn You On (Kaskade Extended Mix)
- Colette - Hypnotized (Kaskade Extended Mix)
- Colette - What Will She Do For Love (Kaskade's Big Room Mix)
- Conjure One - Face the Music (Kaskade Club Mix)
- Crystal Method featuring Emily Haines - Come Back Clean (Kaskade Remix) – No. 11 Billboard Hot Dance Club Songs
- Dada Life - Happy Violence (Kaskade Remix)
- Daft Punk - Rinzler (Kaskade Remix)
- David Morales featuring Tamra Keenan - Here I Am (Kaskade Remix) – No. 1 Billboard Hot Dance Club Play
- Diplo and Blond:ish featuring Kah-Lo - Give Dem (Kaskade Remix)
- Disney - Baby Mine (Kaskade Remix) - Dconstructed
- Dissent - Bleeding Together (Kaskade Remix)
- Empire of the Sun - Walking on a Dream (Kaskade Club Remix)
- Esmée Denters - Outta Here (Kaskade Club Remix)
- Floetry - SupaStar (Kaskade Vocal Mix)
- Frank Sinatra - Mistletoe & Holly (Kaskade Mix)
- Galantis - Runaway (U & I) (Kaskade Remix)
- Galantis - Smile (Kaskade Remix)
- Galantis - You (Kaskade Remix)
- Genki Rockets - Breeze (Kaskade Remix)
- Haley - This Is How It Goes (Kaskade's Grand Club Edit)
- Imagine Dragons - Believer (Kaskade Remix)
- Jay-J & Mark Grant - Love Is (Kaskade Mix)
- Jack Ü - Where Are Ü Now (Kaskade Remix)
- J-Boogie's Dubtronic Science - Rainfall (Kaskade Remix)
- Jennifer Lopez featuring French Montana - Medicine (Kaskade Remix)
- Jes - Imagination (Kaskade Club Remix) – No. 1 Billboard Hot Dance Airplay
- Joachim Garraud - The Computer (Kaskade Mix)
- Joslyn - Funk 2 Night (Kaskade Remix)
- Jyongri - Lullaby For You (Kaskade Mix)
- Justin Timberlake - LoveStoned (Kaskade Remix) – No. 1 Billboard Hot Dance Club Play
- Justin Timberlake - Like I Love You (Kaskade Full Vox Mix)
- Kaskade - Cold As Stone (Kaskade's Sunsoaked Mix)
- Kaskade and The Moth & The Flame - Haunt Me (V.2)
- Katy Perry - Teenage Dream (Kaskade Club Mix)
- Keri Hilson - Slow Dance (Kaskade Remix)
- King Kooba - If I Could (Kaskade More Pop Mix)
- Kings of Tomorrow - Finally (Kaskade's dance.love Mix)
- Koda Kumi - Run For Your Life (Kaskade Remix)
- Kygo - Stargazing (Kaskade Remix)
- Lady Gaga - Bad Romance (Kaskade Remix) – No. 1 Billboard Hot Dance Club Songs
- Lady Gaga featuring Beyoncé - Telephone (Kaskade Remix)
- Lana Del Rey - Young & Beautiful (Kaskade Remix)
- Late Night Alumni - All For Nothing (Kaskade Mix)
- Late Night Alumni - Another Chance (Kaskade's 'Homage To Roger' Remix)
- Late Night Alumni - Empty Streets (Kaskade Remix)
- Late Night Alumni - I Knew You When (Kaskade Mix)
- Late Night Alumni - It's Not Happening (Kaskade Remix)
- Late Night Alumni - One More Chance (Kaskade Mix)
- Late Night Alumni - The This This (Kaskade Remix)
- LeAnn Rimes - What I Cannot Change (Kaskade Remix) – No. 1 Billboard Hot Dance Airplay
- Lil - Your Affection (Kaskade Remix)
- Little Boots - Remedy (Kaskade Club Remix)
- Livvi Franc - Now I'm That Bitch (Kaskade Remix) – No. 1 Billboard Hot Dance Club Play
- Location Location - Let's Begin (Kaskade Extended Edit)
- Madonna - Miles Away (Kaskade Remix)
- Mark Farina - Cali Spaces (Kaskade Remix)
- Mark Farina - To Do (Kaskade Carry On Mix)
- Maroon 5 featuring Future - Cold (Kaskade & Lipless Remix)
- Mocean Worker - Chick a Boom Boom Boom (Kaskade Remix)
- Mr. O featuring Sara Smith - Lights Out (Kaskade Remix)
- Naked Music NYC - If I Fall (Kaskade Soulshower Mix)
- Natalie Bassingthwaighte - Alive (Kaskade Remix)
- Nicole Scherzinger - Don't Hold Your Breath (Kaskade Remix)
- Nelly Furtado - All Good Things (Come to an End) (Kaskade Remix) – No. 1 Billboard Hot Dance Club Play
- Noisettes - Never Forget You (Kaskade Mix)
- Neon Trees - Animal (Kaskade Mix)
- Odesza featuring Sasha Sloan - Falls (Kaskade Remix)
- Outkast - The Way You Move (Kaskade Mix)
- Paul van Dyk - Home (Kaskade Remix)
- Paris Hilton - Nothing in This World (Kaskade Remix) – No. 12 Billboard Hot Dance Club Play
- Peyton - I'll Rise (Kaskade Remix)
- Plumb - In My Arms (Kaskade Extended Remix)
- Pussycat Dolls - Don't Cha (Kaskade Remix) – No. 1 Billboard Hot Dance Club Play.
- Rasmus Faber - Are You Ready (Kaskade Remix)
- R3hab & Swanky Tunes - Sending My Love (Kaskade Remix)
- Rithma - Builder (Kaskade Let's Make Out Mix)
- Rithma - Love & Music (Kaskade Remix)
- Robyn - Call Your Girlfriend (Kaskade Remix)
- Roomsa featuring Lady Sarah - This Girl (Kaskade Remix)
- Rufus Wainwright - Go Or Go Ahead (Kaskade Mix)
- Samantha James - Waves of Change (Kaskade Extended Remix)
- Seal - Amazing (Kaskade Remix) – No. 1 Billboard Hot Dance Club Play (two weeks)
- The Sellars - Fair Game (Kaskade Remix)
- Skrillex - Scary Monsters and Nice Sprites (Kaskade Remix)
- Skylar Grey - Invisible (Kaskade Remix)
- Skylar Grey - I Know You (Kaskade Remix)
- Slander and Dylan Matthew - Love Is Gone (Kaskade Remix)
- Sultan & Ned Shepard featuring Nadia Ali - Call My Name (Kaskade Club Mix)
- Summer Of Space - Hearts Reaction (Kaskade Electro Rubb)
- Summer Of Space - With You (Kaskade Does Rock Mix)
- Terri Walker - Guess You Didn't Love Me (Kaskade Remix)
- Timbaland - Morning After Dark (Kaskade Extended Mix)
- truth® - Smaller Babies (Kaskade Remix)
- Usher - Climax (Kaskade Remix)
- West Magnetic - Give It Up For Free (Kaskade's Vision Mix)
- The World's Most Beautiful - I'm A Lot Like You (Kaskade's Vocal Mix)
- Zedd - Shave It (Kaskade Remix)
- Zip Zip Through The Night - Beestung (Kaskade's Grand Mix)
