= EDX discography =

This is the discography of Swiss DJ and music producer EDX.

== Studio albums ==
- 2012: On the Edge
- 2017: Two Decades

== Other albums ==
- 2011: No Xcuses – The Violet Edition
- 2014: On the Edge – Remixed

== Singles ==
- 1997: "I'm Not Interested"
- 1999: "Dancing with You" (with Leon Klein)
- 2000: "Gonna Catch You" (with Leon Klein)
- 2000: "Tango!" (with Leon Klein)
- 2002: "Lift Me Up"
- 2003: "I Need Love"
- 2008: "Please Don’t Go" (with DJ Tatana as Dobenbeck featuring Joanna)
- 2008: "Casa Grande"
- 2009: "Shy Shy"
- 2009: "Ready to Go" (with Chris Reece and Jerome Isma-Ae)
- 2010: "Hoover"
- 2010: "Don’t Stop Dancing" (with Kaskade)
- 2010: "Out of the Rain" (featuring Tamra Keenan)
- 2010: "Thrive"
- 2011: "Embrace"
- 2011: "Falling Out of Love" (featuring Sarah McLeod)
- 2011: "D.A.N.C.E."
- 2011: "Give It Up for Love" (with John Williams)
- 2012: "This Is Your Life" (with Nadia Ali)
- 2012: "Love Express" (with Seamus Haji feat. Jerique)
- 2012: "Sunset Miracles"
- 2012: "Everything" (featuring Hadley)
- 2012: "Miami Device" (with Stan Kolev and Chris Reece)
- 2012: "Touched"
- 2013: "Blessed"
- 2013: "The Sun" (with Leventina)
- 2013: "Hazed"
- 2013: "Live My Life"
- 2013: "Acido"
- 2013: "Hyped"
- 2013: "Reckless Ardor"
- 2014: "Cool You Off"
- 2014: "Air for Life"
- 2014: "Empathy"
- 2014: "Collateral Effects"
- 2014: "Breathin'"
- 2014: "Make Me Feel Good"
- 2015: "Remember House"
- 2015: "Want You"
- 2015: "Belong"
- 2016: "Missing" (featuring Mingue)
- 2016: "My Friend"
- 2016: "Omertà"
- 2016: "High on You"
- 2017: "Dharma"
- 2017: "All I Know"
- 2017: "Bloom"
- 2017: "We Can't Give Up"
- 2017: "Feel The Rush"
- 2018: "Jaded"
- 2018: "Anthem"
- 2018: "Sillage"
- 2019: "Who Cares"
- 2019: "Off the Grid" (with Amba Shepherd)
- 2019: "Ubuntu"
- 2019: "Stay"
- 2019: "Neptune"
- 2019: "Voltaic"
- 2020: "Adore Me"
- 2020: "The Time Is Now"
- 2020: "I Found You (Neptune)" (featuring Jess Ball)
- 2020: "Umoja"
- 2020: "Indian Summer"
- 2021: "Take Me Home" (featuring Jess Ball)
- 2021: "Vommuli"
- 2022: "On My Mind"
- 2022: "Don't Be Afraid" (featuring Allie Crystal)
- 2022: "Holy Wood" (with Frey)
- 2022: "Out Of Control" (with Nicky Romero)
- 2022: "Conundrum"
- 2022: "So Good"
- 2023: "Renascence"
- 2023: "Rhythm Of The Night" (with Frey)

== Selected remixes ==
2006:

- Fuzzy Hair and Steve Angello – "In Beat"
- Martin Solveig – "Rocking Music"

2007:

- Dubfire – "Roadkill"
- Sikk – "The Whisper"
- Sucker DJs – "Lotta Lovin'"
- Armin van Buuren – "The Sound of Goodbye"
- deadmau5 – "Arguru"

2008:

- John O’Callaghan – "Big Sky"
- Kaskade – "Angel on My Shoulder"
- Sebastian Ingrosso and Laidback Luke – "Chaa Chaa"
- Yves Larock – "Say Yeah"
- Axwell and Bob Sinclar – "What a Wonderful World"
- Robbie Rivera – "In Too Deep"

2009:

- Funkagenda – "Breakwater"
- Afrojack – "Radioman"
- Paul Harris feat. Sam Obernik – "The Take"
- ATB featuring Flanders – "Behind"
- Beyoncé – "Why You Don’t Love Me"
- Mary J. Blige – "Stronger"
- Roger Sanchez – "Get2Gether"

2010:

- Dinka – "Elements"
- Dannii Minogue – "You Won't Forget About Me"
- Roger Sanchez – "2Gether"
- Adam K – "My Love"
- Cedric Gervais – "Ready or Not"
- Nadia Ali – "Fantasy"
- Benny Benassi featuring Kelis and Apl.De.Ap – "Spaceship"

2011:

- Gala – "Freed from Desire"
- Gaia – "Stellar"

2012:

- Avicii – "Silhouettes"

2013:

- Cazzette – "Weapon"
- Calvin Harris – "Thinkin' About You"
- Avicii - "Wake Me Up"

2014:

- Calippo - "Back There"

2015:

- Sam Feldt - "Show Me Love" (featuring Kimberly Anne) (EDX's Indian Summer Remix)
- Spada featuring Anna Leyne – "Catchfire" (Sun Sun Sun)
- Robin Schulz featuring Francesco Yates - "Sugar"

2016

- EDX - "Roadkill" (EDX's Ibiza Sunrise Remix)

2017:

- Tiësto - "On My Way" (EDX's Miami Sunset Remix)
- Lika Morgan - "Feel The Same" (EDX's Dubai Skyline Remix)
- Haevn - "Finding Out More" (EDX's Acapulco At Night Remix)
- Charlie Puth - "How Long" (EDX's Dubai Skyline Remix)

2018:

- Janelle Monáe - "Make Me Feel" (EDX Dubai Skyline Remix)
- David Guetta featuring Anne-Marie - "Don't Leave Me Alone" (EDX's Indian Summer Remix)

2019

- Loud Luxury and Bryce Vine - "I'm Not Alright" (EDX's Dubai Skyline Remix)
- Charli XCX — "White Mercedes" (EDX's Miami Sunset Remix)

2020

- Tom Gregory — "What Love Is" (EDX's Acapulco At Night Remix)

2022

- Noa Kirel — "Thought About That" (EDX's Ibiza Sunset Remix)
