= In the Moment =

In the Moment may refer to:

- In the Moment (Kaskade album), 2004
- In the Moment (Gateway album), 1996
- In the Moment (Larnell Lewis album), 2018

== See also ==
- In the Moment – Live in Concert, a 2000 album by Dianne Reeves
