= Dynasty (Kaskade album) =

2010 American electronic album

Studio album by Kaskade
- Released: 27 April 2010 (digital); 11 May 2010 (physical)
- Genre: House; dance
- Length: 48:19
- Label: Ultra Records
- Producer: Kaskade

Kaskade chronology
Strobelite Seduction (2008)	Dynasty (2010)	Fire & Ice (2011)

Singles from Dynasty
- 1. "Dynasty" Released: April 6, 2010; 2. "Fire in Your New Shoes" Released: August 31, 2010; 3. "Don't Stop Dancing" Released: October 12, 2010; 4. "Only You" Released: February 1, 2011; 5. "All That You Give" Released: February 22, 2011; 6. "Call Out" Released: March 8, 2011

Dynasty is the sixth solo album by house DJ Kaskade. It was released on iTunes on April 27, 2010, and physically on May 11, 2010. It debuted at number 1 on the Billboard Heatseekers Albums chart, number 4 on the Billboard Dance/Electronic Albums chart, and number 104 on the Billboard 200. The songs "Dynasty," "Fire in Your New Shoes" and "Call Out" were released as promo singles on iTunes in April, 2010, preceding the album's release.

== Track listing ==
This album was also released with extended versions available on Beatport and Juno.

Standard version
No.	Title	Writer(s)	Producer(s)	Length
1.	"Start Again" (featuring Becky Jean Williams)	Ryan Raddon, Finn Bjarnson, John Hancock, Mark Phillips	Raddon, Bjarnson	4:15
2.	"Don't Stop Dancing" (with EDX featuring Haley)	Raddon, Bjarnson, Maurizio Colella, Christian Hirt	Raddon, Bjarnson, Colella, Hirt	4:36
3.	"Dynasty" (featuring Haley)	Raddon, Bjarnson	Raddon, Bjarnson	3:16
4.	"Say It's Over" (featuring Mindy Gledhill)	Raddon, Bjarnson, Hancock	Raddon, Bjarnson	4:05
5.	"Fire in Your New Shoes" (featuring Martina Sorbara from Dragonette)	Raddon, Bjarnson, Phillips, Martina Sorbara	Raddon, Bjarnson	2:39
6.	"Human Reactor" (featuring Polina)	Raddon, Bjarnson, Hancock, Polina Goudieva	Raddon, Bjarnson	4:10
7.	"Only You" (with Tiësto featuring Haley)	Raddon, Bjarnson, Tijs Verwest, D.J. Waakop Reijers-Fraaij	Raddon, Tiësto, Bjarnson	4:50
8.	"Call Out" (featuring Mindy Gledhill)	Raddon, Bjarnson	Raddon, Bjarnson	4:02
9.	"To the Skies" (featuring Polina)	Raddon, Bjarnson, Hancock, Goudieva	Raddon, Bjarnson	4:08
10.	"Don't Wait" (featuring Haley)	Raddon, Bjarnson, Hancock	Raddon, Bjarnson	3:40
11.	"Empty Streets" (featuring Becky Jean Williams)	Bjarnson	Raddon, Bjarnson	4:06
12.	"All That You Give" (featuring Mindy Gledhill)	Raddon, Bjarnson, Hancock	Raddon, Bjarnson	4:32

iTunes Store version (bonus track)
No.	Title	Length
13.	"Only You" (with Tiësto featuring Haley) (Kaskade remix)	6:42

== Chart performance ==
Chart (2010)	Peak position
US Billboard 200	104
US Dance/Electronic Albums	4
US US Digital	13
