= Love Mysterious =

Studio album by Kaskade
- Released: September 26, 2006
- Genre: House; deep house
- Length: 54:21
- Label: Ultra Records
- Producer: Kaskade, Finn Bjarnson, Andy Caldwell, John Hancock

Kaskade chronology
The Calm (2006)	Love Mysterious (2006)	Strobelite Seduction (2008)

Singles from Love Mysterious
- 1. "Be Still" Released: 2006; 2. "Stars Align" Released: 2006; 3. "In This Life" Released: 2007; 4. "Sorry" Released: 2007; 5. "Sometimes" Released: 2007; 6. "4 AM" Released: 2008; 7. "All You" Released: 2011

Professional ratings
Review scores
Source	Rating
AllMusic	3.5/5 stars

Love Mysterious is the fourth solo album by house DJ Kaskade. It was released on September 26, 2006 by Ultra Records.

The first single from the album, "Be Still", reached #4 on Billboard Magazine’s Hot Dance Club Play chart. The single features vocalist Sunsun and includes remixes by Jay-J and Robbie Rivera. The follow-up single "Stars Align" hit number #8 on "Billboard Magazine" Hot Dance Airplay chart and just missed the top ten at #11 on the Hot Dance Club Play chart. The fourth single "Sorry" was his third consecutive top ten hit on Billboard's Hot Dance Airplay Chart, at #9. Dirty South provided a remix for "Sorry". The remix was nominated for a 2008 Grammy for Best Remixed Recording.

== Track listing ==
No.	Title	Writer(s)	Length
1.	"Stars Align"	Ryan Raddon, Finn Bjarnson	4:18
2.	"Be Still"	Ryan Raddon, Finn Bjarnson	3:45
3.	"In This Life"	Ryan Raddon, Finn Bjarnson	4:21
4.	"All You"	Ryan Raddon, Finn Bjarnson	4:05
5.	"Sorry"	Ryan Raddon, Finn Bjarnson, Andy Caldwell	4:38
6.	"Distance"	Ryan Raddon, Finn Bjarnson	3:39
7.	"The X"	Ryan Raddon, Finn Bjarnson	4:47
8.	"Fake"	Ryan Raddon, Finn Bjarnson	3:00
9.	"Sometimes"	Ryan Raddon, Finn Bjarnson	5:14
10.	"Never Ending"	Ryan Raddon, Finn Bjarnson	3:59
11.	"4 AM"	Ryan Raddon, Finn Bjarnson	4:18

- Note: The track listing of the American CD release is the same, but the tracks appear in a different order to those listed (specifically tracks 2–9).

Bonus Track For Japanese Edition
No.	Title	Writer(s)	Length
12.	"Arrival"	Ryan Raddon, Finn Bjarnson	2:57

== Charts ==
Chart performance for Love Mysterious
Chart (2006)	Peak position
US Top Dance Albums (Billboard)	12

== Personnel ==
- Ryan Raddon - Producer, Writer
- Finn Bjarnson - Producer (All tracks), Writer (All tracks), Vocals ("Sorry" and "The X")
- Andy Caldwell - Additional Production ("Sorry" and "The X")
- John Hancock - Additional Production ("Sometimes")
- Marcus Bentley - Vocals ("Stars Align" and "Sometimes")
- Sunsun - Vocals ("Be Still")
- Mark Phillips - Guitar ("Be Still")
- Joslyn Petty (Joslyn) - Vocals ("In This Life", "Distance", "Fake", and "Never Ending")
- Chuck Love - Trumpet ("Distance")
- Craig Poole - Bass ("Distance")
- Becky Jean Williams - Vocals ("All You" and "4 AM")
- Haley Gibby (Haley) - Vocals ("Arrival")
