= Strobelite Seduction =

Studio album by Kaskade
- Released: May 20, 2008
- Genre: House; deep house
- Length: 39:06
- Label: Ultra Records
- Producer: Kaskade, Finn Bjarnson, Deadmau5, Count De Money, Late Night Alumni

Kaskade chronology
Love Mysterious (2006)	Strobelite Seduction (2008)	Dynasty (2010)

Singles from Strobelite Seduction
- 1. "Move for Me" Released: 1st February 2009 (US) 11th December 2011 (UK); 2. "I Remember" Released: 2008; 3. "Angel On My Shoulder" Released: 8th May 2012 (US) 7th January 2013 (UK); 4. "Step One Two" Released: 2008

Strobelite Seduction is the fifth solo album by the house DJ Kaskade. It was released on May 20, 2008, by Ultra Records.

The first single from the album, "Move for Me", with the Canadian progressive house/trance musician Deadmau5 and the vocalist Haley Gibby, reached number one on Billboard's Hot Dance Airplay chart on September 6, 2008, becoming Kaskade's fifth top ten hit, and his first number one, on the list. The dance single has become a crossover hit, managing to reach number 71 on the Canadian Hot 100 on February 14, 2009. The third single from the album, "Angel on My Shoulder" (with Tamra Keenan), was released in late 2008. It also found success on the dance chart, reaching number 5 on Billboard's Hot Dance Airplay Chart. The fourth and final single, "Step One Two", was released in late 2008 with remixes by various artists, such as Tommy Trash.

"I Remember", another collaboration with Deadmau5 and Haley, was released as the third single from Deadmau5's 2008 album Random Album Title. It became Kaskade's first UK hit, peaking inside the top 15 on the UK Singles Chart. The single was his second chart topper on the Billboard dance chart. The video clip which accompanied "I Remember" was filmed in Manchester, England.

The bonus track, the Adam K and Soha remix of "4 AM", became a digital single from the album. The original version of this track is featured on Kaskade's 2006 album Love Mysterious.

== Track listing ==
No.	Title	Writer(s)	Length
1.	"Move for Me" (with deadmau5)	Joel Zimmerman, Ryan Raddon, Finn Bjarnson	3:57
2.	"Angel On My Shoulder"	Ryan Raddon, Finn Bjarnson, Tamra Keenan	3:47
3.	"Back On You"	Julien Louis Marc Aletti, Raphael Marc Roman Aletti	3:42
4.	"Step One Two"	Finn Bjarnson, Ryan Raddon	3:20
5.	"Pose"	Finn Bjarnson, Ryan Raddon	3:34
6.	"I Remember" (Strobelite Edit) (with deadmau5)	Joel Zimmerman, Ryan Raddon, Finn Bjarnson	4:43
7.	"Borrowed Theme"	Finn Bjarnson, Ryan Raddon	3:44
8.	"I'll Never Dream"	Finn Bjarnson, Ryan Raddon	3:47
9.	"One Heart"	Finn Bjarnson, Ryan Raddon	4:00
10.	"Your Love Is Black"	John Hancock, Tamra Keenan	4:32

U.S. iTunes Bonus Track
No.	Title	Writer(s)	Length
11.	"4 AM" (Adam K & Soha Radio Edit)	Ryan Raddon, Finn Bjarnson	3:39

Bonus Track For Japanese Edition
No.	Title	Writer(s)	Length
11.	"Are You Listening"	Ryan Raddon, Finn Bjarnson	3:09

== Personnel ==
- Ryan Raddon (Kaskade) - producer, writer
- Finn Bjarnson - producer, writer
- Joel Zimmerman (deadmau5) - producer, writer ("Move for Me" and "I Remember")
- Haley Gibby (Haley) - vocals ("Move for Me", "Step One Two" and "I Remember")
- Tamra Keenan (Tamra) - writer, vocals ("Angel On My Shoulder" and "Your Love Is Black")
- Julien Louis Marc Aletti (Count De Money) - additional production, writer ("Back On You")
- Raphael Marc Romain Aletti (Count De Money) - additional production, writer ("Back On You")
- Sunsun - vocals ("Back On You", "I'll Never Dream" and "Are You Listening")
- Latrice Barnett - vocals ("Pose")
- John Hancock - writer ("Borrowed Theme" and "Your Love Is Black"), additional keyboards ("Pose")
- Becky Jean Williams - writer, vocals ("Borrowed Theme", "One Heart" and "4 AM")
- Late Night Alumni (Raddon, Bjarson, Hancock and Williams) - additional production ("Borrowed Theme")
- Ellen Bridger - cello ("Your Love Is Black")
- Aaron Ashton - violin ("Your Love Is Black")

== Charts ==
Chart (2008–2023)	Peak position
US Dance/Electronic Albums	7
US Independent Albums	36
US Top Heatseekers	12
