= Of Birds, Bees, Butterflies, Etc. =

Studio album by Late Night Alumni
- Released: November 3, 2009 (digital download); February 02, 2010 (CD)
- Recorded: 2009
- Genre: House
- Label: Ultra Records

Late Night Alumni chronology
Empty Streets (2005)	Of Birds, Bees, Butterflies, Etc. (2009)	Haunted (2011)

Singles from Of Birds, Bees, Butterflies, Etc.
- 1. "You Can Be the One" Released: September 1, 2009; 2. "Finally Found" Released: December 22, 2009

Of Birds, Bees, Butterflies, Etc. is the second studio album by American house music group Late Night Alumni. It was released through Ultra Records as a digital download on November 3, 2009, with the physical CD being released later on February 2, 2010.

On September 1, 2009, the group released "You Can Be the One" as their first single from the album. The singles contains remixes by Sultan & Ned Shepard, Killgore & John Hollow, while the Sultan & Ned Shepard remix became its own single later on September 22, 2009. A music video for the live version of the song was uploaded to Late Night Alumni's YouTube channel on October 12, 2009, and it has often been compared to Kaskade's music video for his song, "4AM", with Becky Jean Williams. Another single for the song "Finally Found" was released on December 22, 2009, as well as a music video on March 16, 2010.

== Track listing ==
No.	Title	Length
1.	"What's in a Name"	3:41
2.	"Finally Found"	3:45
3.	"You Can Be the One"	3:13
4.	"Light Reading"	3:32
5.	"Golden"	3:40
6.	"Uncharted"	3:46
7.	"Small Things"	3:59
8.	"Run a Mile"	4:57
9.	"Of Birds, Bees, Butterflies, Etc."	4:14
10.	"It's All the Same to Me"	3:27
11.	"Potions"	3:51
12.	"What If I Say Please"	3:03
13.	"Minutes"	6:02
