= Automatic (Kaskade album) =

Studio album by Kaskade
- Released: September 25, 2015
- Recorded: 2014–2015
- Genre: Dance; progressive house; deep house
- Length: 53:11
- Label: Warner Bros.; Arkade

Kaskade albums chronology
Atmosphere (2013)	Automatic (2015)	Kaskade Christmas (2017)

Singles from Automatic
- 1. "A Little More" Released: December 10, 2014; 2. "Never Sleep Alone" Released: April 6, 2015; 3. "Disarm You" Released: July 24, 2015; 4. "We Don't Stop" Released: August 21, 2015; 5. "Whatever" Released: February 12, 2016; 6. "Us" Released: March 4, 2016

Professional ratings
Review scores
Source	Rating
AllMusic	4/5 stars
PopMatters	5/10 stars
Rolling Stone	2.5/5 stars

Automatic is the ninth studio album of the American house DJ and electronic music producer Kaskade. It was released on September 25, 2015, through Warner Bros. Records & Arkade.

== Track listing ==
No.	Title	Writer(s)	Producer(s)	Length
1.	"We Don't Stop"	Ryan Raddon; Finn Bjarnson; Kenneth Nathaniel Pyfer	Raddon; Bjarnson	4:15
2.	"Us" (with CID)	Raddon; Bjarnson; Julia Karlsson; Anton Rundberg	Raddon; Bjarnson; Carlos Cid	3:15
3.	"Mercy" (with Galantis)	Raddon; Bjarnson; Christian Karlsson; Henrik Jonback; Svidden; Salem Al Fakir	Raddon; Bjarnson; Christian Karlsson; Linus Eklöw; Salem Al Fakir	4:02
4.	"Tear Down these Walls" (featuring Tamra Keenan)	Raddon; Bjarnson; Jayme David Silverstein; Steve Mits	Raddon; Bjarnson	4:05
5.	"Phoenix" (featuring Sasha Sloan)	Raddon; Bjarnson; Cody Tarpely; Jarrod Gorbel; Sasha Yatchenko	Raddon; Bjarnson; Cody Tarpley	3:35
6.	"Disarm You" (featuring Ilsey)	Raddon; Bjarnson; Nathaniel Motte; Ilsey Juber; Jeremy Coleman	Raddon; Bjarnson; Nathaniel Motte	3:41
7.	"Never Sleep Alone" (featuring Tess Comrie)	Raddon; Bjarnson; Pyfer	Raddon; Bjarnson	3:44
8.	"Day Trippin'" (featuring Estelle)	Raddon; Bjarnson; Thomas Troelsen; Andreas Schuller; Bonnie McKee	Raddon; Troelsen; Axident	3:12
9.	"Promise" (featuring K. Flay)	Raddon; Bjarnson; Kristine Flaherty	Raddon; Bjarnson	3:35
10.	"Breaking Up" (featuring Scott Shepard)	Raddon; Bjarnson; Mark Phillips	Raddon; Bjarnson	4:46
11.	"A Little More" (Kaskade with John Dahlbäck featuring Sansa)	Raddon; Bjarnson; Karolus Viitala; Otto Yliperttula; Sannaliisa Ikka	Raddon; Bjarnson; John Dahlbäck	3:53
12.	"Papercuts" (Kaskade with Two Nations)	Raddon; Bjarnson; Pyfer; Marcus Bentley	Raddon; Bjarnson	3:08
13.	"Where Are You Now" (featuring Tamra Keenan)	Raddon; Bjarnson	Raddon; Bjarnson	3:56
14.	"Whatever" (featuring KOLAJ)	Raddon; Bjarnson; Michael McGarity; Theresa Houston	Raddon; Bjarnson; McGarity	4:03
Total length:				53:11

== Charts ==
=== Weekly charts ===
Weekly chart performance for Automatic
Chart (2015)	Peak position
US Billboard 200	25
US Top Dance Albums (Billboard)	2

=== Year-end charts ===
Year-end chart performance for Automatic
Chart (2015)	Position
US Top Dance/Electronic Albums (Billboard)	19

== Release history ==
Region	Date	Label	Format
Canada; European Union; United States; United Kingdom	September 25, 2015	Warner Bros. Records	CD, digital download
