= Empty Streets =

Studio album by Late Night Alumni
- Released: August 29, 2005
- Genre: House; progressive house; downtempo
- Label: Hed Kandi

Late Night Alumni chronology
Empty Streets (2005)	Of Birds, Bees, Butterflies, Etc. (2009)

Singles from Empty Streets
- 1. "Empty Streets" Released: September 2005

Empty Streets is the debut album by the American house group Late Night Alumni, released through Hed Kandi Records. It was released physically in the UK on August 29, 2005.

The lead single from the album of the same name, "Empty Streets", was released in September 2005 and it features remixes by Haji & Emanuel, Kaskade and Aurora. The Haji & Emanuel remix was featured in Tiësto's compilation album In Search of Sunrise 5: Los Angeles (without crediting it as a remix) and, at the time, became one of the series' most downloaded tracks. Kaskade remade the song for his 2010 album Dynasty.

== Track listing ==
No.	Title	Length
1.	"Seemingly Sleepy"	3:40
2.	"Rainy Days"	4:07
3.	"Empty Streets"	5:55
4.	"The Rest of You"	5:17
5.	"Sunrise Comes Too Soon"	3:49
6.	"Eros"	4:01
7.	"Keep Up with Me"	4:57
8.	"Heaven"	4:30
9.	"Beautiful"	3:58
10.	"Meant to Be"	4:21
11.	"All for Nothing"	4:57
12.	"Nothing Left to Say"	4:33
