= Dynasty (song) =

Single by Kaskade featuring Haley

from the album Dynasty
- Released: April 6, 2010
- Recorded: 2010
- Genre: Progressive house
- Length: 3:16
- Label: Ultra
- Songwriter(s): Ryan Raddon; Finn Bjarnson; Haley Gibby
- Producer(s): Kaskade; Finn Bjarnson

Kaskade singles chronology
"I Remember" (2008)	"Dynasty" (2010)	"Fire in Your New Shoes" (2010)

Haley singles chronology
"So Far Away" (2009)	"Dynasty" (2010)	"Don't Stop Dancing" (2010)

Music video
- "Dynasty" on YouTube

"Dynasty" is the title track from the electronic dance album of the same name by American DJ/producer and musician Kaskade. It features vocals by longtime collaborator Haley Gibby (simply credited as Haley), who for the first time was given lead billing on this single – which was inspired by an event that Kaskade was headlining. This track would become Kaskade's first number one on Billboard's Hot Dance Airplay chart after collaborating with deadmau5 (his third number one overall), as well as Gibby's first number one as a featured lead vocalist.

== Track listings ==
- Digital download - single
1. "Dynasty" - 3:16
- Dynasty (Remixed)
1. "Dynasty" (Kaskade Club Mix) - 8:00
2. "Dynasty" (Kaskade Arena Remix) - 7:38
3. "Dynasty" (Michael Woods Club Mix) - 7:55
4. "Dynasty" (Michael Woods Vocal Mix) - 7:55
5. "Dynasty" (Dada Life Remix) - 5:30
6. "Dynasty" (Sunnery James & Ryan Marciano Remix) - 7:00
- Digital download - Beatport contest winner remix single
1. "Dynasty" (Alex Rich Remix) - 6:18

== Chart positions ==
- Hot Dance Airplay: #1
