= Mindy Gledhill =

American singer-songwriter

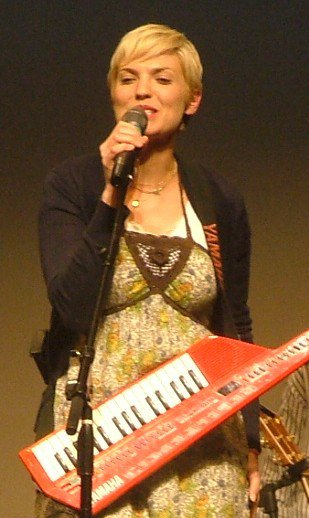

Background information
- Born: March 7, 1981 (age 44)
- Origin: Eureka, California, United States
- Genres: Pop; indie folk; folk rock
- Instrument: Vocals
- Years active: 2004–present
- Labels: Lumen
- Website: mindygledhill.com

Mindy Gledhill (born March 7, 1981) is an American singer-songwriter from Eureka, California who is best known for her songs "I Do Adore" and "Anchor". She is also known for her guest vocal work with DJ Kaskade.

== Early life ==
Gledhill spent most of her youth in Eureka, California and was raised as a member of the Church of Jesus Christ of Latter-day Saints (LDS Church), being the eighth of nine children. In her early teens, she lived in Spain with her family. After moving back to the United States, she studied music at Brigham Young University. After marriage and becoming a parent, Gledhill decided to leave the LDS Church.

== Career ==
Gledhill released her debut album, The Sum of All Grace, in the beginning of 2004 with Lumen Records. However, she soon dropped her label in pursuit of a more indie sound, citing her desire to not be contained by a single musical category. All of her subsequent albums have been released through her own Blue Morph label. She is recognized for her albums Feather in the Wind (2007), Anchor (2010), and Pocketful of Poetry (2013).

She has performed alongside artists including Katie Herzig, Juno Award winner Meaghan Smith, and Meteor Choice Music Prize winner Julie Feeney.

In addition to performing solo, Gledhill also appears with her brother-in-law, Dustin Gledhill, as Hive Riot. In 2012, Gledhill was included in a list of "Utah Valley's 40 Under 40" in Utah Valley Business Quarterly (she was 31 at the time). In January 2014, she was the featured cover story in its sister publication, Utah Valley Magazine.

=== Anchor ===
Gledhill's third album, Anchor, was produced and engineered by Stuart Brawley. Studio musicians that played on the album include Jamie Wollam, Joe Corcoran, and Matt Mayhall.

Anchor was self-released in the United States and by FarGo Music in South Korea. The album featured several favorably received pop/folk rock tracks and led to Gledhill's invitation to the Durango Songwriters Expo 2011. On April 3, 2011 the single "Crazy Love" reached No. 1 on the Korean streaming service Bugs Music. The song also reached No. 7 on the South Korea (GAON) music chart. Seven other tracks also charted on the South Korean charts.

Music videos for "Anchor" and "Whole Wide World" have both amassed more than 1 million views on YouTube.

Gledhill performed at Monaco Film Festival 2009, Sundance Film Festival 2010.

=== Winter Moon ===
Winter Moon, a Christmas compilation album featuring two original tracks, was released on October 16, 2011. It was also produced and engineered by Stuart Brawley. The album pre-sold more than 4,500 hard copies through local outlets in the USA alone and was later released via a limited release in Japan. In support of the album, she toured the west coast supported at select dates by the Teton Chamber Orchestra. In December 2012, she toured Japan in support of the album's release there.

=== Pocketful of Poetry ===
Her fourth album, Pocketful of Poetry, produced by Cason Cooley in Nashville, was released on September 11, 2013. It features Nashville-based studio musicians including the Love Sponge Strings and Gledhill's frequent guitarist, Joe Corcoran. The album was mixed by Justin Gerrish and mastered by Joe LaPorta.

=== Rabbit Hole ===
Gledhill's most recent album, released on January 25, 2019. The album was based on her leaving the LDS after researching the church's history.

== Kaskade appearances ==
Gledhill is featured as a guest vocalist on Kaskade's song, "Eyes", the first single from his album Fire & Ice which hit No. 1 on Billboard Dance Airplay and No. 17 on Billboard 200. The album was nominated for a GRAMMY for Best Dance/Electronica Album. She also appears in the music video for "Eyes".

She also provided guest vocals on three tracks on Kaskade's 2010 album Dynasty including "Say It's Over", "Call Out" and "All That You Give". "Call Out" and "All That You Give" eventually were released as singles. The album reached No. 104 on Billboard 200 and No. 4 on Billboard Dance Airplay. It also earned Kaskade nominations for "Best American DJ", "Best Producer", and "Best Full Length DJ Mix" at the 2009 IDMA's.

== Television and film ==
Gledhill's music has appeared in various television shows (We Got Married, Bones, 20/20, and Jane by Design) and films (Beau Jest, Christmas Angel, Scents and Sensibility, The Power of Two, and Meet the Mormons).

== Commercials ==
The non-album track "Bring Me Close" was used in a Fruit of the Loom commercial that aired during the 2012 Summer Olympics. Gledhill also provided piano and vocal tracks for a AAA Super Bowl XLVIII commercial.

== Discography ==
=== Albums ===
- The Sum of All Grace (2004, Lumen)
- Feather in the Wind (2007, Blue Morph)
- Anchor (2010, Blue Morph)
- Winter Moon (2011, Blue Morph)
- Pocketful of Poetry (2013, Blue Morph)
- Rabbit Hole (2019, Blue Morph)

=== Singles ===
- "See The Good" (2011)
- "California" 7" (2012, Production Dessinée)
- "Bring Me Close" (2012)
- "Pocketful of Poetry" 7" (2015, Production Dessinée)
- "Despacito" (2017, digital self-release)

=== Other appearances ===
- Various artists - Summer Fever (2005, Shadow Mountain) — song: "A Little More Like Thee"
- Nashville Tribute Band - Joseph: A Nashville Tribute to the Prophet (2005, Highway) — song: "Emma"
- Nashville Tribute Band - Trek: A Nashville Tribute to the Pioneers (2007, Highway) — songs: "Sleep", "One Who Understands"
- Various artists - Steady and Sure: Especially for Youth 2008 (2008, Platinum Sounds) — song: "Jesus, the Very Thought of Thee"
- Various artists - Nearer: A New Collection Of Favorite Hymns (2009, Shadow Mountain) — song: "Be Still, My Soul"
- Kaskade - Dynasty (2010, Ultra) – featured in "Say It's Over", "Call Out", "All That You Give"
- Kaskade - Fire & Ice (2011, Ultra) – featured in "Eyes"

== Awards and nominations ==
Year	Nominee / work	Award	Result
2012	Fire & Ice (featured artist)	Grammy Award for Best Dance/Electronica Album	Nominated

=== Pearl Awards ===
- New Recording Artist (2005)
- Inspirational Album: The Sum of All Grace (2005)
- Inspirational Recording: "Emma" from Nashville Tribute Band's Joseph: A Nashville Tribute to the Prophet (2006)
- Singer-Songwriter or Folk Recorded Song: "Hard" from Feather in the Wind (2008)

== Music videos ==
Year	Video	Director
2007	"Feather in the Wind"	N/A
2010	"Anchor"	Matt Eastin
2011	"Whole Wide World"	Julian Acosta & Derek Pueblo
2011	"Eyes (feat. Mindy Gledhill)"	Matt Eastin
2011	"Winter Moon (with puppet friends)"	Christopher Clark
2013	"Pocketful of Poetry"	Matt Eastin & Corey Fox
2017	"Oh No!"	Trisha Zemp
2019	"Boo Hoo!"	Trisha Zemp
