= I Remember (Deadmau5 and Kaskade song) =

Single by Deadmau5 and Kaskade

from the album Random Album Title and Strobelite Seduction
- Released: 15 September 2008
- Recorded: 2008
- Genre: Progressive house, ambient house
- Length: 9:54 (vocal mix); 9:08 (mixed album version); 3:21 (radio edit); 4:44 (Strobelite edit)
- Label: mau5trap (CAN); Virgin (UK); Ultra (US)
- Songwriters: Finn Bjarnson; Ryan Raddon; Joel Zimmerman
- Producer: Deadmau5

Deadmau5 singles chronology
"Move for Me" (2008)	"I Remember" (2008)	"Ghosts 'n' Stuff" (2008)

Kaskade singles chronology
"Move for Me" (2008)	"I Remember" (2008)	"Dynasty" (2010)

Music video
- "I Remember" (extended) on YouTube

Professional ratings
Review scores
Source	Rating
Digital Spy	4/5 stars

"I Remember" is a song by Canadian electronic music composer Deadmau5 and American DJ Kaskade. It was produced by Deadmau5, co-written by Kaskade with Finn Bjarnson and features vocals by English singer Haley Gibby. It was released as the fifth single from Deadmau5's third studio album, Random Album Title, on 15 September 2008.

== Music video ==
There are two video versions, a 10-minute short film and an edited 4-minute version. It was produced by Anthony and Christopher Donnelly of Mancunian Gio-Goi fame and Mike Moran from Mojofuel. The video was directed by Colin O'Toole, cast by Graeme Brown, and stars British actor Stephen Graham, Warren Brown, Aston Kelly (Graham's brother), Greg Costello, and Coronation Street actress Emma Edmondson. It was filmed in Manchester and features Graham's character talking to two young men (Brown & Kelly) about life and rave culture. The young men then proceed to find a suitable venue for what is later revealed to be an illegal rave with Deadmau5 performing as the DJ.

The video features a raver (Costello) wearing a Kaskade t-shirt, and Deadmau5 wearing a YourOwnClothing t-shirt. At the end of the video, the Deadmau5 song "Brazil (2nd edit)" is mixed in as an outro. Graham was almost arrested after police mistook the video for a genuine illegal rave. The video also ends with a "to be continued" title card but no video appears to have been designated as the plot continuation.

The audio-only version upload on September 19, 2008, onto the Ultra Music YouTube channel has been played 84.2 million times as of June 2024.

== Appearances ==
A remix of the song by FreeStyleGames appears in the 2010 video games GoldenEye 007 and DJ Hero 2.

"I Remember" was also featured on the soundtrack of the 2011 film The Lincoln Lawyer. The song can be heard during the film when Jesus Martínez, played by Michael Peña, explains his version of the events which occurred on the night of Donna Rentería's murder.

This song is also featured in the television series Gossip Girl episode "The Empire Strikes Jack" (Season 3 episode 16). The song, being played by Deadmau5 himself, appears in the scene of Eleanor Waldorf's pop up fashion show.

Large sections of "I Remember" were sampled by hip-hop duo Suicideboys on their song "Antarctica". Deadmau5 publicly lambasted the duo for this on Twitter, claiming that Suicideboys were "publicizing other people's intellectual property without consent." "Antarctica", which had been out since January and subsequently reached millions of plays on both YouTube and SoundCloud, was taken down by Suicideboys on both platforms and no further action was taken. "Antarctica" was reuploaded to Spotify and YouTube in late 2021, with Deadmau5 getting considerable publishing credits.

== Impact and legacy ==
In 2022, American magazine Rolling Stone ranked "I Remember" number 149 in their list of 200 Greatest Dance Songs of All Time.

== Track listings ==
Digital download
No.	Title	Length
1.	"I Remember" (Original Mix)	10:01
2.	"I Remember" (Instrumental Mix)	9:57

12" vinyl
No.	Title	Length
1.	"I Remember" (Vocal Mix)	9:53
2.	"I Remember" (Instrumental)	9:57

12" vinyl (Italy)
No.	Title	Length
1.	"I Remember" (Vocal Mix)	9:57
2.	"Bye Friend" (Original)	5:40

CD promo (US)
No.	Title	Length
1.	"I Remember" (Radio Edit)	3:50
2.	"I Remember" (Vocal Mix)	9:53
3.	"I Remember" (Instrumental)	4:42

CD single (UK)
No.	Title	Length
1.	"I Remember" (Extended Version)	9:54
2.	"I Remember" (Extended Version) (Edit)	6:00
3.	"I Remember" (Instrumental)	9:58
4.	"I Remember" (J Majik & Wickaman Vocal Mix)	6:15
5.	"I Remember" (Radio Edit)	3:21
6.	"I Remember" (Caspa Remix)	5:35

Digital download (Remixes)
No.	Title	Length
1.	"I Remember" (Radio Edit)	3:20
2.	"I Remember" (Vocal Mix)	9:53
3.	"I Remember" (Instrumental)	4:42
4.	"I Remember" (J Majik & Wickaman Remix)	6:14
5.	"I Remember" (J Majik & Wickaman Dub)	6:13
6.	"I Remember" (Caspa Remix)	5:35
7.	"I Remember" (Caspa Remix Instrumental)	5:35

=== Strobelite Edit ===
Kaskade released an edit of the song on his Strobelite Seduction album.

No.	Title	Length
6.	"I Remember" (Strobelite Edit)	4:43

== Charts performance ==
In the United Kingdom, the single charted and peaked at number 14 on the UK Singles Chart on 17 May 2009. It spent a total of nine weeks in the top 40 chart. The song has since been certified silver by the British Phonographic Industry (BPI) for sales of 200,000 units. In the summer of 2009, the single was regularly played in UK clubs, especially in bigger clubs in London. In the United States, it reached number one on Billboard's Hot Dance Airplay chart on the issue dated 17 October 2009 giving the duo their second consecutive number one together, following "Move for Me" (2008).

=== Weekly charts ===
Chart (2009)	Peak position
Belgium Dance (Ultratop Flanders)	14
Belgium Dance (Ultratop Wallonia)	14
European Hot 100 Singles (Billboard)	46
Netherlands (Dutch Top 40)	14
Netherlands (Single Top 100)	23
Scottish Singles Sales (Official Charts)	37
UK Singles (Official Charts)	14
UK Dance (Official Charts)	3
US Dance/Electronic Digital Songs (Billboard)	29
US Dance Airplay (Billboard)	1

=== Year-end charts ===
Chart (2009)	Position
Netherlands (Dutch Top 40)	84
UK Singles (OCC)	114
US Dance/Mix Show Airplay (Billboard)	13

== Certifications ==
Region	Certification	Certified units/sales
Canada (Music Canada)	Gold	40,000^{‡}
New Zealand (RMNZ)	Gold	15,000^{‡}
United Kingdom (BPI)	Platinum	600,000^{‡}
^{‡} Sales+streaming figures based on certification alone.
