= Faded Paper Figures =

American new wave band

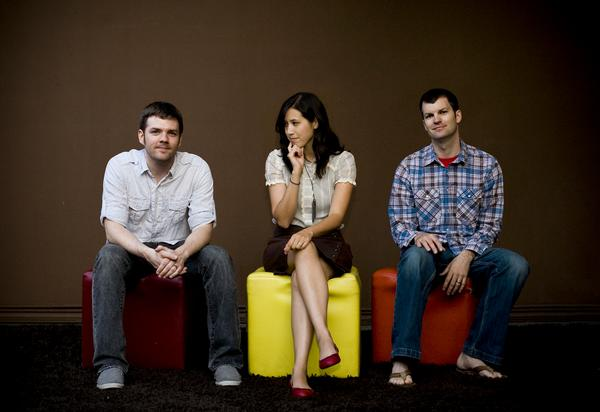
- Faded Paper Figures in 2008

Background information
- Origin: Irvine, California, U.S.
- Genre: Synthpop Indie Pop Indietronica
- Years active: 2007–present
- Label: Shorthand
- Members: Kael Alden, R. John Williams, Heather Alden
- Website: www.fadedpaperfigures.com

Faded Paper Figures (abbreviated as FPF) is an American indie pop electronica band from Los Angeles, California. FPF is known for their electro-organic sound sometimes compared to bands and artists like Weevil, The Postal Service, Belle and Sebastian, Lights and Morrissey.

The band consists of three members, R. John Williams (guitar and vocals), Kael Alden (bass, guitar, drums), and Heather Alden (vocals). The band formed in February 2007 and released their debut album Dynamo in 2008. Their second album New Medium, was released on May 25, 2010. Their third album The Matter was released on October 22, 2012. The band's fourth album, Relics released on August 5, 2014. Their E.P Chronos was released on January 24, 2017. The band released the albums Kairos on July 17, 2020, Morningside on February 3, 2023, and Triangles on December 3, 2025.

== Career ==
Faded Paper Figures met in early 2007 at a party in Irvine, California, where John Williams and Kael Alden were discussing music. Kael was composing music for TV and film with his older brother's company, Robot Repair. Williams already had some experience as a musician and songwriter. Over the next few months the pair wrote and composed a number of songs, experimenting with blending traditional guitar with electronica. The songs posted on Myspace page under the name "Machine Discourse." Heather Alden later joined the group as a harmony vocalist, and the band's name was changed to Faded Paper Figures.

Faded Paper Figures released their first album, Dynamo, on July 11, 2008. The track "Being There" won Best Song of the Year in the UC Irvine Songwriting Contest. A music video of "Metropolis" came out and the band began to play live concerts. They were chosen Best Electronic live band by the OC Music Awards in 2009, and were declared one of the New York Post's "must have" new music of 2009.

The group's second album, New Medium, was released May 25, 2010. During their summer 2010 west coast tour, Kurt Deninger (drums) and Sebastian Hackett (additional keys and guitars) were added to the band's lineup.

The band's third studio album, along with two new music videos, was released in late 2012. The album was among the CMJ top 100 albums during November and December 2012, before falling off the chart again in early 2013. The Matter was also recently released in China (along with Dynamo and New Medium) in a box set on the Chinese "Wind Music" record label.

The band's fourth album was released on Aug. 5, 2014, with various tracks previewing in the weeks before that. The album has already received wider coverage than any of the band's previous albums, with reviews in the U.S. in Paste Magazine, BULLETT Magazine, PopDose; and at Clash Magazine and Wonderland in the UK. The album also debuted in the CMJ top 100.

The band's fifth full-length album "Kairos" was announced for summer 2020 at Variance Magazine.

John's sister is Late Night Alumni singer, Becky Jean Williams

== Discography ==
=== Albums ===
- Dynamo (July 11, 2008)
- New Medium (May 25, 2010)
- The Matter (October 23, 2012)
- Relics (Aug. 5, 2014)
- Remnants (EP) (July 30, 2015)
- Chronos (January 24, 2017)
- Kairos (July 17, 2020)
- Morningside (February 3, 2023)
- Triangles (December 3, 2025)

=== Singles ===
- "Logos (remix)" (2010)
