= Dinka (DJ) =

Swiss DJ from Lucerne

- Birth name: Tamara Hunkeler
- Born: 24 June
- Genres: Progressive house
- Occupations: Disc jockey; remixer
- Years active: 2007–present
- Labels: S2 Records; Vandit Records; Anjunabeats; A State of Trance; Silk Music; Pineapple Digital

Dinka (born Tamara Hunkeler on 24 June; also known as Tamara Maria Kler) is a Swiss DJ from Lucerne. She performs progressive house music with elements of world music, which she describes as "Multicultural Dance Music".

After coming in contact with Above & Beyond, who appreciated her music, Tamara signed with their label, Anjunabeats. She also earned a deal with A State of Trance, a subsidiary of Dutch DJ Armin van Buuren's Armada Music. In September 2012, she reached #2 at the Billboard Next Big Sound chart.

Her stage name comes from the Dinka people from South Sudan. When asked for the reason she chose such a name, she commented:

I've been amazed by their story of fighting for their culture. And it seemed to be the right start to connect continents. I want people to be aware of everything happening on this planet. And on a second level to accept and share similarities rather than go crazy about differences.

== Discography ==
=== Studio albums ===
- 2008 The Temptation Album
- 2010 Hotel Summerville
- 2011 Tales of the Sun

=== Singles / EPs ===
- 2007 "The Sin"
- 2007 "The Temptation"
- 2008 "Chemistry"
- 2008 "Wildfire"
- 2008 "Native"
- 2008 "Autumn Leaves" (with Chris Reece)
- 2008 "Asylum"
- 2009 "Temptation" (Vandit Records)
- 2009 "Canonball"
- 2009 "Green Leaf" (feat. Lizzie Curious)
- 2009 "Civilisation / Zero Altitute"
- 2009 "Eyelash"
- 2009 "Elements"
- 2009 "Scarlet"
- 2010 "Elements - Remixes" (inkl. EDX Remix)
- 2010 "Soma Is Language" (with George F. Zimmer)
- 2010 "Some People Will Never Learn"
- 2010 "Aircraft"
- 2010 "Camouflage"
- 2010 "Hive"
- 2010 "Hive - The Remixes" (includes Stan Kolev Remix)
- 2010 "Violet"
- 2011 "Luminal" (with Stan Kolev)
- 2011 "Violet (The Remixes)"
- 2011 "On The Beach"
- 2011 "The Sleeping Beauty"
- 2011 "Reach For Me" (feat. Hadley & Danny Inzerillo)
- 2011 "SkyScraper"
- 2011 "White Christmas"
- 2012 Purple EP
- 2012 "Chariots" (with Leventina)
- 2012 Innocence EP
- 2012 "Lotus"
- 2012 "Radiate" (feat. Julie Thompson)
- 2012 Polarity EP
- 2012 "Inseparable" (feat. Angelika Vee)
- 2013 "Elements" (Reload 2013) with Leventina
- 2013 "Closer"
- 2013 "Waterproof"
- 2014 "In Caelo" (with Morttagua)
- 2014 "Not Okay" (with Tania Zygar)
- 2015 "Breathe"
- 2015 "Ueberflieger" (with Atlantis Ocean)
- 2016 Phobos/Lumino EP (with Atlantis Ocean)
- 2016 "First Pluto"
- 2017 "Philomena" (with Erik Iker)
- 2017 "Campfire 2017" (Sons of Maria Retouch)
- 2023 "Delightful"
- 2023 "Turning Leaves"
- 2024 "Escape from Society"
- 2024 "Daytona"
- 2024 "Runaway"
- 2024 "Silent Waves"
- 2024 "Tokyo"
