= The Calm (Kaskade album) =

Studio album by Kaskade
- Released: March 30, 2006
- Genre: Electronic; electronic rock; house
- Length: 38:02
- Label: Quiet City
- Producer: Ryan Raddon

Kaskade chronology
In the Moment (2004)	The Calm (2006)	Love Mysterious (2006)

The Calm is the third studio album by American DJ and producer Kaskade. It was released on March 30, 2006, by Quiet City Recordings. In 2014, it was announced that the album was published on YouTube.

== Track listing ==
No.	Title	Length
1.	"Wink Of An Eye"	4:08
2.	"Heart Attack"	3:35
3.	"McCammon"	3:51
4.	"Right Dream"	3:57
5.	"Soft Upon The Lips" (with Haley Gibby)	2:55
6.	"Remembering Rufus"	4:45
7.	"Stay This"	2:47
8.	"Nobody Else"	4:52
9.	"Words And Melody"	3:57
10.	"Surrender"	3:15
