= It's You, It's Me =

Studio album by Kaskade
- Released: March 18, 2003; March 28, 2013 (Deluxe Edition)
- Genre: House
- Length: 1:02:51
- Label: OM Records

Kaskade chronology
It's You, It's Me (2003)	In the Moment (2004)

Professional ratings
Review scores
Source	Rating
AllMusic	4/5 stars

It's You, It's Me is the debut studio album by American house DJ Kaskade. It was released on March 18, 2003, by OM Records.

A deluxe edition of the album was released on March 28, 2013, before Kaskade's It's You, It's Me Redux tour. The deluxe album edition contains the full-length original album with tracks and remixes from Kaskade's first four official singles: "What I Say", "Gonna Make It", "I Feel Like" and "It's You, It's Me". The nine-city tour commemorates ten years of the album's release by performing in areas similar to where the artist began.

== Track listing ==
No.	Title	Writer(s)	Length
1.	"Meditation to the Groove"	Ryan Raddon, Finn Bjarson, Yoni Gileadi	6:58
2.	"I Feel Like"	Ryan Raddon, Finn Bjarson, Yoni Gileadi	5:48
3.	"What I Say" (Soft Shuffle Mix)	Ryan Raddon, Finn Bjarson, Yoni Gileadi, Craig Poole, Rob Wannamaker	4:57
4.	"This Rhythm"	Ryan Raddon, Finn Bjarson, Yoni Gileadi, Craig Poole	4:34
5.	"Mak Mop"	Ryan Raddon, Finn Bjarson, Yoni Gileadi	1:17
6.	"Seeing Julie" (featuring Amy Michelle)	Ryan Raddon, Finn Bjarson, Yoni Gileadi	4:40
7.	"It's You, It's Me"	Ryan Raddon, Finn Bjarson, Yoni Gileadi	4:55
8.	"Get Busy" (featuring Rob Wannamaker)	Ryan Raddon, Finn Bjarson, Yoni Gileadi, Craig Poole, Rob Wannamaker	4:13
9.	"Tonight" (featuring Amy Michelle)	Ryan Raddon, Finn Bjarson, Yoni Gileadi, Amy Gileadi	5:34
10.	"Charlie's Plight"	Ryan Raddon, Finn Bjarson	3:55
11.	"My Time"	Ryan Raddon, Finn Bjarson, Yoni Gileadi	4:55
12.	"Call Me Wise"	Ryan Raddon, Finn Bjarson, Yoni Gileadi, Rob Wannamaker	5:31
13.	"Close" (featuring Amy Michelle)	Ryan Raddon, Finn Bjarson	5:39

=== Deluxe Edition ===
Disc 1
No.	Title	Writer(s)	Length
1.	"Meditation to the Groove"	Ryan Raddon, Finn Bjarson, Yoni Gileadi	6:58
2.	"I Feel Like"	Ryan Raddon, Finn Bjarson, Yoni Gileadi	5:48
3.	"What I Say"	Ryan Raddon, Finn Bjarson, Yoni Gileadi, Craig Poole, Rob Wannamaker	4:57
4.	"This Rhythm"	Ryan Raddon, Finn Bjarson, Yoni Gileadi, Craig Poole	4:34
5.	"Mak Mop"	Ryan Raddon, Finn Bjarson, Yoni Gileadi	1:17
6.	"Seeing Julie" (featuring Amy Michelle)	Ryan Raddon, Finn Bjarson, Yoni Gileadi	4:40
7.	"It's You, It's Me"	Ryan Raddon, Finn Bjarson, Yoni Gilead	4:55
8.	"Get Busy" (featuring Rob Wannamaker)	Ryan Raddon, Finn Bjarson, Yoni Gileadi, Craig Poole, Rob Wannamaker	4:13
9.	"Tonight" (featuring Amy Michelle)	Ryan Raddon, Finn Bjarson, Yoni Gileadi, Amy Gileadi	5:34
10.	"Charlie's Plight"	Ryan Raddon, Finn Bjarson	3:55
11.	"My Time"	Ryan Raddon, Finn Bjarson, Yoni Gileadi	4:55
12.	"Call Me Wise"	Ryan Raddon, Finn Bjarson, Yoni Gileadi, Rob Wannamaker	5:31
13.	"Close" (featuring Amy Michelle)	Ryan Raddon, Finn Bjarson	5:39
14.	"It's You, It's Me" (Marques Wyatt's Deep Interpretation Remix)	Ryan Raddon, Finn Bjarson, Yoni Gilead	6:47
15.	"It's You, It's Me" (Jason Hodges Remix)	Ryan Raddon, Finn Bjarson, Yoni Gilead	6:33

Disc 2
No.	Title	Writer(s)	Length
1.	"What I Say" (Original Mix)	Ryan Raddon, Finn Bjarson, Yoni Gileadi, Craig Poole, Rob Wannamaker	8:23
2.	"What I Say" (Gravel Sax Dub)	Ryan Raddon, Finn Bjarson, Yoni Gileadi, Craig Poole, Rob Wannamaker	7:56
3.	"What I Say" (Bonus Beats)	Ryan Raddon, Finn Bjarson, Yoni Gileadi, Craig Poole, Rob Wannamaker	2:00
4.	"Gonna Make It" (Original Mix)	Ryan Raddon, Finn Bjarson, Craig Poole, Rob Wannamaker	7:44
5.	"Gonna Make It" (Truth Be Told Mix)	Ryan Raddon, Finn Bjarson, Craig Poole, Rob Wannamaker	3:30
6.	"Gonna Make It" (Ryan Raddon's West Coast Dub)	Ryan Raddon, Finn Bjarson, Craig Poole, Rob Wannamaker	5:50
7.	"Gonna Make It" (Tribal Jazz Mix)	Ryan Raddon, Finn Bjarson, Craig Poole, Rob Wannamaker	6:51
8.	"I Feel Like" (Extended Mix)	Ryan Raddon, Finn Bjarson, Yoni Gileadi	8:55
9.	"I Feel Like" (Flute Dub)	Ryan Raddon, Finn Bjarson, Yoni Gileadi	6:50
10.	"I Feel Like" (Accapella)	Ryan Raddon, Finn Bjarson, Yoni Gileadi	3:29

== Personnel ==
- Ryan Raddon (Kaskade) – Production (all tracks), Writing (all tracks)
- Finn Bjarnson – Additional Production (all tracks), Writing (all tracks)
- Yoni Gileadi – Additional Production (all tracks), Writing (all tracks except 13)
- Craig Poole – Writing (3, 4, 8), Bass
- Rob Wannamaker – Writing (3, 8, 12), Vocals in "What I Say" (Soft Shuffle Mix) and "Get Busy", Keyboards
- Amy Michelle – Vocals in "Seeing Julie", "Tonight" and "Close"
- Joslyn Petty (Joslyn) – Vocals in "Meditation to the Groove", "I Feel Like", "This Rhythm", "It's You, It's Me" and "My Time"
- Scott Johnson – Electric Piano
- Rich Dixon – Guitar
- Darron Bradford – Flute
- Nathan Botts – Trumpet
- Mike Roskelley – Mixing
- Barry Gibbons – Mastering
