= Sunsun =

American singer-songwriter and performer

- Born: Melisa Sunsun Morgan; September 29
- Origin: United States
- Genres: House
- Occupations: Singer-songwriter, performer
- Website: www.myspace.com/sunsunmusic

Sunsun is an American singer-songwriter and performer.

In September 2006, Sunsun debuted on DJ Kaskade's fourth solo album Love Mysterious as the vocalist for the album's first single, "Be Still", which reached No. 4 on Billboard Magazine’s Hot Dance Club Play.

Sunsun is also a vocalist on Kaskade's seventh album, Strobelite Seduction, for the songs "Back On You" and "I'll Never Dream" (and the Japanese bonus track "Are You Listening"). She is also heard on Kaskade's dance.love DJ mix in the song "Raining" (with Adam K).

In 2011, Sunsun was a featured vocalist in the song "Happiness" for Swimming With Dolphins' first studio album, Water Colours.

She has since participated with Kaskade in the recording of "Baby Mine" for the Disney remix album Dconstructed, performing Betty Noyes' original vocals.
