= Atmosphere (Kaskade album) =

Studio album by Kaskade
- Released: September 10, 2013
- Recorded: 2012–13
- Genre: Dance, progressive house, deep house
- Length: 51:35
- Label: Ultra Records
- Producer: Ryan Raddon, Finn Bjarnson, John Hancock, Project 46, Swanky Tunes, Benjamin Curtis, Mark Phillips

Kaskade albums chronology
Fire & Ice (2011)	Atmosphere (2013)	Automatic (2015)

Singles from Atmosphere
- 1. "No One Knows Who We Are" Released: December 24, 2012; 2. "Atmosphere" Released: June 10, 2013; 3. "Last Chance" Released: November 22, 2013

Atmosphere is the eighth studio album of American house DJ and electronic dance music producer Kaskade. It was released in the United States and Canada on September 10, 2013, through Ultra Records.

== Reception ==
Professional ratings
Aggregate scores
Source	Rating
Metacritic	62/100
Review scores
Source	Rating
AllMusic	3.5/5 stars
Los Angeles Times	2.5/4 stars
Las Vegas Weekly	2.5/5 stars
NOW	3/5 stars
PopMatters	6/10
Rolling Stone	2.5/5 stars

The album shares similar success with his previous studio album Fire & Ice. It became Kaskade's second No. 1 on the Billboard Dance/Electronic Albums chart. It also made its debut at No. 16 on the Billboard Top 200 chart, as well as number 7 on the Billboard Digital Albums chart and number 2 on the Billboard Independent Albums chart. Atmosphere earned Kaskade his second Grammy nomination for Best Dance/Electronica Album in 2014.

The album received mixed reviews from mainstream critics. Metacritic rated Atmosphere an average score of 62 out of 100 based on 5 reviews, indicating "generally positive reviews".

== Track listing ==
All tracks are written by Ryan Raddon and Finn Bjarnson, except for tracks 3, 7 and 11.

No.	Title	Writer(s)	Producer(s)	Length
1.	"Last Chance" (with Project 46) (vocals by Stef Lang)	Ryan Henderson, Tman "Thomas" Shaw, Andrew Allen	Raddon, Bjarnson, Project 46	4:18
2.	"Why Ask Why" (with Late Night Alumni)	Becky Jean Williams, John Lee Hancock	Raddon, Bjarnson, Hancock	4:35
3.	"MIA to LAS"	Ryan Raddon	Raddon	3:31
4.	"No One Knows Who We Are" (Kaskade's Atmosphere Mix) (with Swanky Tunes featuring Lights)	Lights, Vadim, Dmitry, Stanislav	Kaskade, Swanky Tunes	4:34
5.	"Feeling the Night" (featuring Becky Jean Williams)		Raddon	4:14
6.	"Take Your Mind Off"		Raddon, Bjarnson	3:42
7.	"LAX to JFK"	Ryan Raddon	Raddon	3:07
8.	"Atmosphere"	Nate Pyfer, McKay Stevens	Raddon, Bjarnson	3:51
9.	"Missing You" (with School of Seven Bells)	Pyfer, Alejandra de la Deheza, Benjamin Curtis	Curtis	3:51
10.	"Something Something" (with Zip Zip Through The Night)	Mark Phillips	Raddon, Bjarnson, Phillips	4:51
11.	"SFO to ORD"	Ryan Raddon	Raddon	3:43
12.	"Floating" (featuring Haley)		Raddon, Bjarnson	3:42
13.	"How It Is" (featuring Debra Fotheringham)		Raddon, Bjarnson	3:36
Total length:				51:35

iTunes bonus tracks
No.	Title	Length
14.	"Atmosphere" (Kaskade Redux Edit)	4:40
15.	"Atmosphere" (video)	4:04

== Credits and personnel ==
Credits adapted from AllMusic and Discogs.

Technical personnel

- Chuck Anderson – artwork
- Kevin Granger – mastering
- Stephanie LaFera – liner notes, management
- Mark Owens – photography

Additional musicians

- Stephanie Lang – vocals (1)
- Aaron Ashton – string arrangement (4)
- John Lee Hancock – string arrangement (4)
- Nicole Pinnell – cello (4)
- Jay Lawrence – vibraphone (6)

== Chart performance ==
Chart (2013)	Peak position
US Billboard 200	16
US Dance/Electronic Albums	1
US Digital Albums	7

== Release history ==
Region	Date	Label	Format
United States; Canada	September 10, 2013	Ultra Records	CD, digital download
