= Atmosphere (Kaskade song) =

Single by Kaskade

from the album Atmosphere
- Released: June 10, 2013
- Genre: Progressive house
- Length: 5:47 (single version); 3:51 (album version)
- Label: Ultra
- Songwriter(s): Ryan Raddon; Finn Bjarnson; Nate Pyfer; McKay Stevens
- Producer(s): Kaskade

Kaskade singles chronology
"No One Knows Who We Are" (2012)	"Atmosphere" (2013)	"Last Chance" (2013)

"Atmosphere" is a song by the American record producer Kaskade. It was released on 10 June 2013, through Ultra Music, as the second single from his tenth studio album Atmosphere. The song was nominated for the 2014 Grammy Award for Best Dance Recording.

== Music video ==
A music video to accompany the release of "Atmosphere" was first released onto YouTube on 27 June 2013 at a total length of four minutes and thirteen seconds.

== Track listings ==
Digital download - Radio Edit
No.	Title	Length
1.	"Atmosphere" (Radio Edit)	3:51

Digital download - Extended Mix
No.	Title	Length
1.	"Atmosphere" (Extended Mix)	5:47

Atmosphere (GTA Remix) - single
No.	Title	Length
1.	"Atmosphere" (GTA Remix)	5:47

Atmosphere (Remixes)
No.	Title	Length
1.	"Atmosphere" (Chocolate Puma Remix)	6:28
2.	"Atmosphere" (Amtrac Remix)	6:18

Atmosphere (Remixes), Pt. 2
No.	Title	Length
1.	"Atmosphere" (Hook N Sling Remix)	5:47
2.	"Atmosphere" (East & Young Remix)	5:44
3.	"Atmosphere" (Cave Kings Remix)	5:30

== Chart performance ==
=== Weekly charts ===
Chart (2013)	Peak position
Belgium (Ultratop 50 Flanders)	110
US Hot Dance/Electronic Songs (Billboard)	24

=== Year-end charts ===
Chart (2013)	Position
US Hot Dance/Electronic Songs (Billboard)	53

== Release history ==
Region	Date	Format	Label
Worldwide	10 June 2013	Digital download - single	Ultra Music
Worldwide	5 July 2013	Digital download - GTA Remix	Ultra Music
Worldwide	26 July 2013	Digital download - Remixes	Ultra Music
Worldwide	23 August 2013	Digital download - Remixes, Pt. 2	Ultra Music
