= On My Way (Tiësto song) =

Single by Tiësto featuring Bright Sparks
- Released: January 13, 2017
- Genre: Tropical house; dance-pop
- Length: 3:03
- Label: Musical Freedom; PM:AM; Universal
- Songwriter(s): Tijs Verwest; Ashley Hicklin; Sergio Popken; Kimberley Sawford
- Producer(s): Tiësto; Ashley Hicklin

Tiësto singles chronology
| "Summer Nights" (2016) | "On My Way" (2017) | "Boom" (2017) |

Bright Sparks singles chronology
| "Your Skin" (2016) | "On My Way" (2017) | "Lying In the Sun" (2017) |

Music video
- "On My Way" on YouTube

"On My Way" is a song released by Dutch DJ and record producer Tiësto on January 13, 2017 via Musical Freedom. The song featured English duo Bright Sparks.

== Reacts and reviews ==
Ruben from French webmedia Guettapen points out the plagiarism practicised by Tiësto to produce the track: "Tiësto hasn't hesitated to take up the main idea of the track 'This Girl' of Kungs and Cookin' on 3 Burners. If only the Dutchman had bothered to edit entirely the melody and the notes of the Frenchman... No way! A beautiful cut, copy, and paste in all its gorgeousness."

Kungs himself reacted to the release of the track on Twitter: "I'm flattered to see that many people think I produced the new Tiësto's track... It's not the case but good track."

== Music video ==
The music video of the song was released on February 9, 2017. A total of seven international YouTube stars, including Werevertumorro, RCLBeauty101, Dagi Bee, Hikakin, Seikin, Royal Stampede, and LubaTV, were starred in the music video and was heading to Tiësto's performance at Hakkasan Nightclub in Las Vegas, on January 14, 2017.

== Track listing ==
Digital download
| No. | Title | Length |
|---|---|---|
| 1. | "On My Way" (featuring Bright Sparks) | 3:03 |

Digital download – EDX’s Miami Sunset Remix
| No. | Title | Length |
|---|---|---|
| 1. | "On My Way" (featuring Bright Sparks) (EDX’s Miami Sunset Remix) | 3:23 |

Digital download – Danny Avila Remix
| No. | Title | Length |
|---|---|---|
| 1. | "On My Way" (featuring Bright Sparks) (Danny Avila Remix) | 2:55 |

== Personnel ==
Credits adapted from Tidal.

- Tiësto – production
- Bright Sparks – vocals
- Ashley Hicklin – production
- Sergio Popken – engineering, mixing
- Addy van der Zwan – master engineering

== Charts ==
=== Weekly charts ===
| Chart (2017) | Peak position |
|---|---|
| Hungary (Dance Top 40) | 7 |
| Hungary (Rádiós Top 40) | 2 |
| Hungary (Single Top 40) | 5 |
| Poland (Polish Airplay Top 100) | 1 |
| Poland (Dance Top 50) | 2 |
| US Hot Dance/Electronic Songs (Billboard) | 36 |

=== Year-end charts ===
| Chart (2017) | Position |
|---|---|
| Hungary (Dance Top 40) | 16 |
| Hungary (Rádiós Top 40) | 13 |
| Hungary (Single Top 40) | 19 |
| Poland (ZPAV) | 2 |

| Chart (2018) | Position |
|---|---|
| Hungary (Dance Top 40) | 69 |

== Certifications ==
| Region | Certification | Certified units/sales |
|---|---|---|
| Brazil (Pro-Música Brasil) | Gold | 30,000^{‡} |
^{‡} Sales+streaming figures based on certification alone.

== Release history ==
| Region | Date | Format | Label | Ref. |
|---|---|---|---|---|
| United States | January 13, 2017 | Digital download | Musical Freedom | |
| United States | March 10, 2017 | Digital download – EDX’s Miami Sunset Remix | Musical Freedom | |
| United States | March 24, 2017 | Digital download – Danny Avila Remix | Musical Freedom | |

== See also ==
- List of number-one singles of 2017 (Poland)
