= Move for Me =

Single by Kaskade and Deadmau5

from the album Strobelite Seduction
- Released: May 14, 2008
- Recorded: 2008
- Length: 3:56 (album version); 2:56 (radio edit); 6:30 (extended mix)
- Label: Ultra
- Songwriter(s): Ryan Raddon; Joel Zimmerman; Finn Bjarnson
- Producer(s): Kaskade; Deadmau5

Kaskade singles chronology
"4 AM" (2008)	"Move for Me" (2008)	"I Remember" (2008)

Deadmau5 singles chronology
"Fifths" (2008)	"Move for Me" (2008)	"I Remember" (2008)

"Move for Me" is a song by American DJ and record producer Kaskade and Canadian electronic music producer Deadmau5. It was released as the lead single from Kaskade's fifth studio album, Strobelite Seduction. The single, which features vocals by British singer Haley Gibby (who has separate 2005 collaboration with Kaskade and writer Finn Bjarnson called "Summer of Space"), reached number one on the Billboard Hot Dance Airplay chart in its issue dated September 6, 2008, giving Kaskade his first number one on the chart after having reached the top ten four times, and deadmau5 his first number-one single on an American chart. Both artists would reach that same summit in October 2009 with "I Remember" with Deadmau5 getting the lead billing and Kaskade being the featured collaborator. In late January 2009 it began charting in Canada. It debuted at number 98 on the Canadian Hot 100, and later peaked at 66.

The song is also featured in DJ Hero 2.

== Track listing ==
Single (US and Canada)
No.	Title	Length
1.	"Move for Me" (Radio Edit)	2:56
2.	"Move for Me" (Extended Mix)	6:29
3.	"Move for Me" (Extended Instrumental)	6:29

Remixes (US)
No.	Title	Length
1.	"Move for Me" (Mind Electric Mix)	7:06
2.	"Move for Me" (Santiago & Bushido Mix)	5:16
3.	"Move for Me" (Rasmus Faber Epic Mix)	7:48
4.	"Move for Me" (Santiago & Bushido Dub)	6:32
5.	"Move for Me" (Rasmus Faber Epic Mix Instrumental)	7:48

GTA Remix (2013)
No.	Title	Length
1.	"Move for Me" (GTA Remix)	4:38

== Charts ==
Chart performance for "Move for Me"
Chart (2008–2010)	Peak position
Canada (Canadian Hot 100)	66
Canada CHR/Top 40 (Billboard)	44
Canada Hot AC (Billboard)	38
UK Dance (OCC)	24
US Dance/Mix Show Airplay (Billboard)	1
