= In the Moment (Kaskade album) =

Studio album by Kaskade
- Released: May 18, 2004; May 24, 2004 (Australia)
- Genre: House; deep house
- Length: 35:22
- Label: OM Records
- Producer: Ryan Raddon

Kaskade chronology
It's You, It's Me (2003)	In the Moment (2004)	The Calm (2006)

In the Moment is the second studio album by American DJ and producer Kaskade. It was released on May 18, 2004, by OM Records.

== Reception ==
Professional ratings
Review scores
Source	Rating
AllMusic	4/5 stars

Tim O'Neil from PopMatters wrote that: "Kaskade — AKA Ryan Raddon ... was discovered with the track “What I Say” and quickly rose to prominence when this track was featured on Mark Grant's Sound Design Volume 2. He was later invited to mix the third volume in the Sounds of Om series, as well as the fourth volume of Om's San Francisco Sessions".

== Track listing ==
No.	Title	Writer(s)	Length
1.	"Steppin' Out"	Ryan Raddon, Finn Bjarson	3:49
2.	"Maybe"	Ryan Raddon, Finn Bjarson, John Hancock	4:40
3.	"I Like the Way" (featuring Colette)	Ryan Raddon, Finn Bjarson, Colette Marino	3:43
4.	"Honesty"	Amy Gileadi, Craig Poole, Yoni Gileadi	4:26
5.	"Sweet Love"	Ryan Raddon, Finn Bjarson	5:26
6.	"Strum"	Amy Gileadi, Yoni Gileadi	4:26
7.	"One You"	Ryan Raddon, Finn Bjarson	3:35
8.	"Interlude"	Ryan Raddon, Finn Bjarson	0:42
9.	"Soundtrack to the Soul" (Slow Motion Mix)	Ryan Raddon, Finn Bjarson, Anthony Green	4:05
10.	"Everything" (with Andy Caldwell)	Ryan Raddon, Finn Bjarson, Andy Caldwell	3:30
11.	"Yeah Right"	Ryan Raddon, Finn Bjarson	3:19
12.	"Move"	Ryan Raddon, Finn Bjarson, Anthony Green	3:41
13.	"Let You Go"	Ryan Raddon, Finn Bjarson, Anthony Green	5:42

Australian Bonus Disc
No.	Title	Writer(s)	Length
1.	"It's You, It's Me" (Original 12" Version)	Ryan Raddon, Finn Bjarson, Yoni Gileadi	8:19
2.	"It's You, It's Me" (Jason Hodges Remix)	Ryan Raddon, Finn Bjarson, Yoni Gileadi	6:33
3.	"Meditation To The Groove" (Johnny Fiasco Remix)	Ryan Raddon, Finn Bjarson, Yoni Gileadi	7:37
4.	"It's You, It's Me" (Marques Wyatt Deep Interpretation Remix)	Ryan Raddon, Finn Bjarson, Yoni Gileadi	6:49
5.	"What I Say" (Original 12" Version)	Ryan Raddon, Finn Bjarson, Yoni Gileadi, Craig Poole, Rob Wannamaker	8:26
6.	"What I Say" (Gravel Sax Dub)	Ryan Raddon, Finn Bjarson, Yoni Gileadi, Craig Poole, Rob Wannamaker	7:55
7.	"Gonna Make It" (Original 12" Version)	Ryan Raddon, Finn Bjarson, Craig Poole, Rob Wannamaker	7:44
8.	"Gonna Make It" (West Coast Dub)	Ryan Raddon, Finn Bjarson, Craig Poole, Rob Wannamaker	5:46

- The Australia-only release includes a bonus CD with mixes of 3 tracks from the It's You, It's Me album.
