= Jay-J =

Background information
- Birth name: Joseph John Hernandez
- Also known as: Shuffle Inc., Moulton Manglers, Your Friends from Moulton Studios
- Born: 1969 (age 55–56)
- Origin: New Jersey, United States
- Genres: Funky house, deep house
- Occupation(s): Disc jockey, producer
- Years active: 1995–present
- Labels: Shifted Music; Ultra Records; Om Records
- Website: www.shiftedmusic.com

Jay-J (born 1969), real name Joseph John Hernandez, is an American house DJ and producer from San Francisco. He has released over 120 recordings since his 1995 debut. From his Moulton Studios he has collaborated with producers and DJs including Kaskade, Miguel Migs, Marques Wyatt, Halo, Julius Papp, Mark Grant and Chris Lum.

He has performed at La Terraza (Spain), Pacha (Ibiza), Zouk (Singapore) and Ministry of Sound (United Kingdom), and performed live at the 2006 MTV Australia Awards, on both the Red Carpet and during the Awards Show.

In 2008, he was selected as one of eight musical artists for Coca-Cola's "WE8" project for the 2008 Summer Olympics in Beijing. Each artist was provided with a theme, and created a song that expanded on the theme.

Jay-J has released compilations as well as co-producing Latrice’s debut album, Illuminate (Ultra), with Kaskade. In 2007 he released Jay-J & Friends Volumes 1-3, a collection of re-mastered tracks from his Moulton Studio recordings and multitracked catalogues, as well as productions from the previous 15 years.

"Live From..." is an iTunes podcast of his sets from clubs in Europe, the Americas, Asia and Australia.

== Discography ==
=== Albums ===
- Electronic Discussions (2011)
- Love Alive (2009)
- Re:Souled | The Shifted Music Remix Collection Vol. 2 (2009)
- Re:Souled | The Shifted Music Remix Collection (2006)
- Illuminate (2006)
- Connected (2005)
- Loveslapped Vol. 3 (2004)
- Defected In The House (2003)
- Reflections (Distance, 2001)
- Jay-J Does Tilted Housework Vol. 1 (2000)

=== Remixes ===
- Airpushers feat Lamont Dozier - Hold The Onionz (2007)
- Mary J Bliige - Everything (2007)
- Jill Scott - He Loves Me (2003) - Grammy nomination for Best Re-mixer.
- Lil' Kim - The Jump Off (2003)
- Donnie McClurkin - Get Back (2001)
- David Gray - Babble On (2001)
- Koffee Brown - Where Da Party At (2001)
