= EDX (DJ) =

Swiss DJ and producer (born 1976)

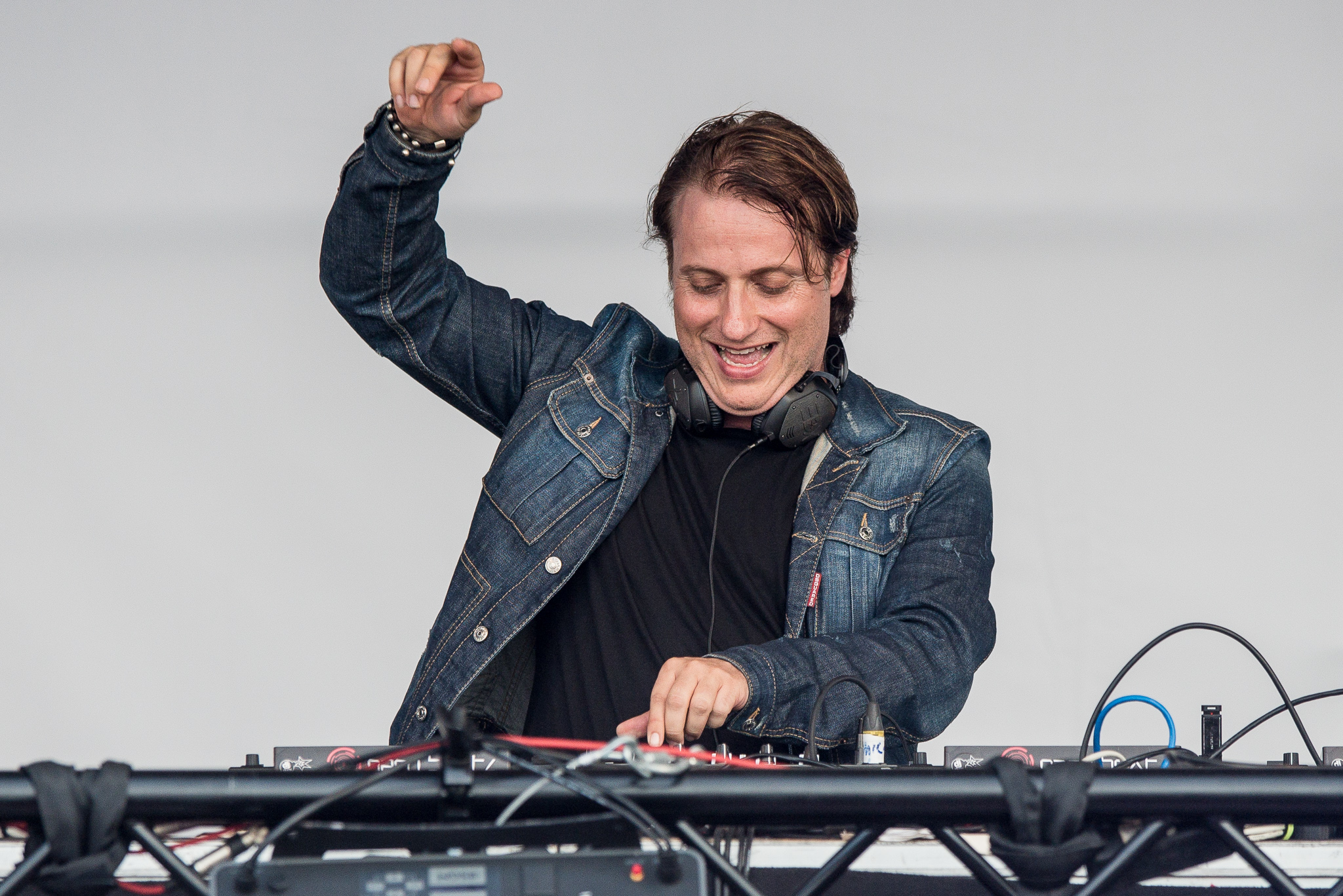
- EDX at Open Beatz 2016

Background information
- Born: Maurizio Colella; 2 November 1976 (age 49); Zurich, Switzerland
- Genres: Progressive house; electro house; deep house
- Occupations: Producer, musician, DJ
- Instruments: Keyboards, turntable
- Years active: 1994–present
- Labels: Armada; Spinnin'; Spinnin' Deep; Toolroom
- Website: edx.ch

Maurizio Colella (born 2 November 1976), better known by his stage name EDX, is a Swiss DJ and Grammy-nominated music producer. The #1 Swiss artist on Spotify, he was proclaimed a genius by British electronic dance music magazine Mixmag for his production and remixing talent. EDX is currently signed to the Spinnin' Deep sublabel of Spinnin' Records, although he also releases via his own label Sirup Music. His radio mix show, No Xcuses, debuted in 2011 on SiriusXM and is now broadcast weekly on several stations around the world including iHeartRadio's Evolution, Sri Lanka's Yes 101, Ukraine's Kiss FM, and Hawaii's My 95.9.

== Biography ==
Ethnically Calabrian and Campanian, EDX was born in Zürich to Italian parents; he credits his Italian heritage for his involvement with music from a young age as well as his summer visits to Italy and experience with the dance music culture there, which influenced his interest in DJing and producing music.

EDX's earliest releases were cassette tape mixes in 1994 for the "Tarot Techno" party series at Club Oxa in Zürich. EDX released his first track, "I'm Not Interested", under Warner Music Switzerland in 1997. The following year, he formed his own record label, Club Control, on which he released several tracks including collaborations with Leon Klein. EDX's most well-known releases with Klein were "Gonna Catch You", which was picked up by Warner Music Switzerland, and DJ Dado's "Where Are You?" on Vale Music, both in 2000; the latter would peak at chart position #17 in Italy. The pair also released remixes of Kool & The Gang, Armand Van Helden, and Steve Angello. EDX also released several mix CDs during this time, both solo and with Klein, mostly for the Energy and Evolution series by Energetic Records, a sublabel of Warner Music.

EDX returned to the music scene in 2007 with a more distinct progressive house style. His remix of Dubfire's "Roadkill" in 2007 featured on Armin van Buuren's Universal Religion Chapter 3. Over the following months, EDX released several more remixes, most notably of van Buuren's "The Sound of Goodbye" and Kaskade's "Angel on my Shoulder", the latter of which EDX credits for his breakthrough in the United States. He also collaborated with Tatana Sterba as a duo under the name Dobenbeck, releasing the track "Please Don't Go" featuring vocals by Sarah Vieth.

EDX was named in the top 3 of Beatport's annual "Best Progressive House Artist" award, along with deadmau5 and Eric Prydz, in 2009. He followed this up with the debut of his still-running weekly radio show, No Xcuses, on SiriusXM and a residency at Ibiza's Space nightclub in 2011. Armada Music also released EDX's dual CD mix, No Xcuses - The Violet Edition in 2011, and the following year EDX released his debut studio album, On the Edge, featuring collaborations with Tamra Keenan, Seamus Haji, Sarah McLeod, and Nadia Ali.

EDX was Beatport's second best-selling deep house artist in 2014, and by the end of 2015, was the top charting artist across all of Beatport, with his original releases "Belong" reaching number one on the Beatport overall chart, and "Breathin'", "Cool You Off", "Reckless Ardor", and "Collateral Effects" as well as his remixes of Nora En Pure's "Uruguay", Cazzette's "Weapon", and Avicii's "Wake Me Up" all charting in the Beatport overall Top 20.

EDX's remix of Sam Feldt's "Show Me Love" in 2015 peaked at #2 on the Beatport overall charts and has reached over 100 million plays on Spotify.

In 2017, EDX signed a Las Vegas residency with Wynn Nightlife. He also continued with his steady stream of releases, including the four Beatport-charting tracks "All I Know", "Feel the Rush", "Bloom", and "We Can't Give Up", as well as his remix of Tiësto's "On My Way".

EDX was nominated for the 2019 Grammy Award for Best Remixed Recording for his remix of Charlie Puth's song "How Long".

== Record label and associated acts ==
EDX founded his own record label, Sirup Music, in 2001. In 2008, EDX formed The Helvetic Nerds along with Dinka and other artists from Christian Hirt's label Enormous Tunes; today, the group consists of EDX, Daniel Portman, Croatia Squad, Sons of Maria, Cedric Zeyenne, and Nora En Pure.
