= Tamra Keenan =

Irish singer/songwriter

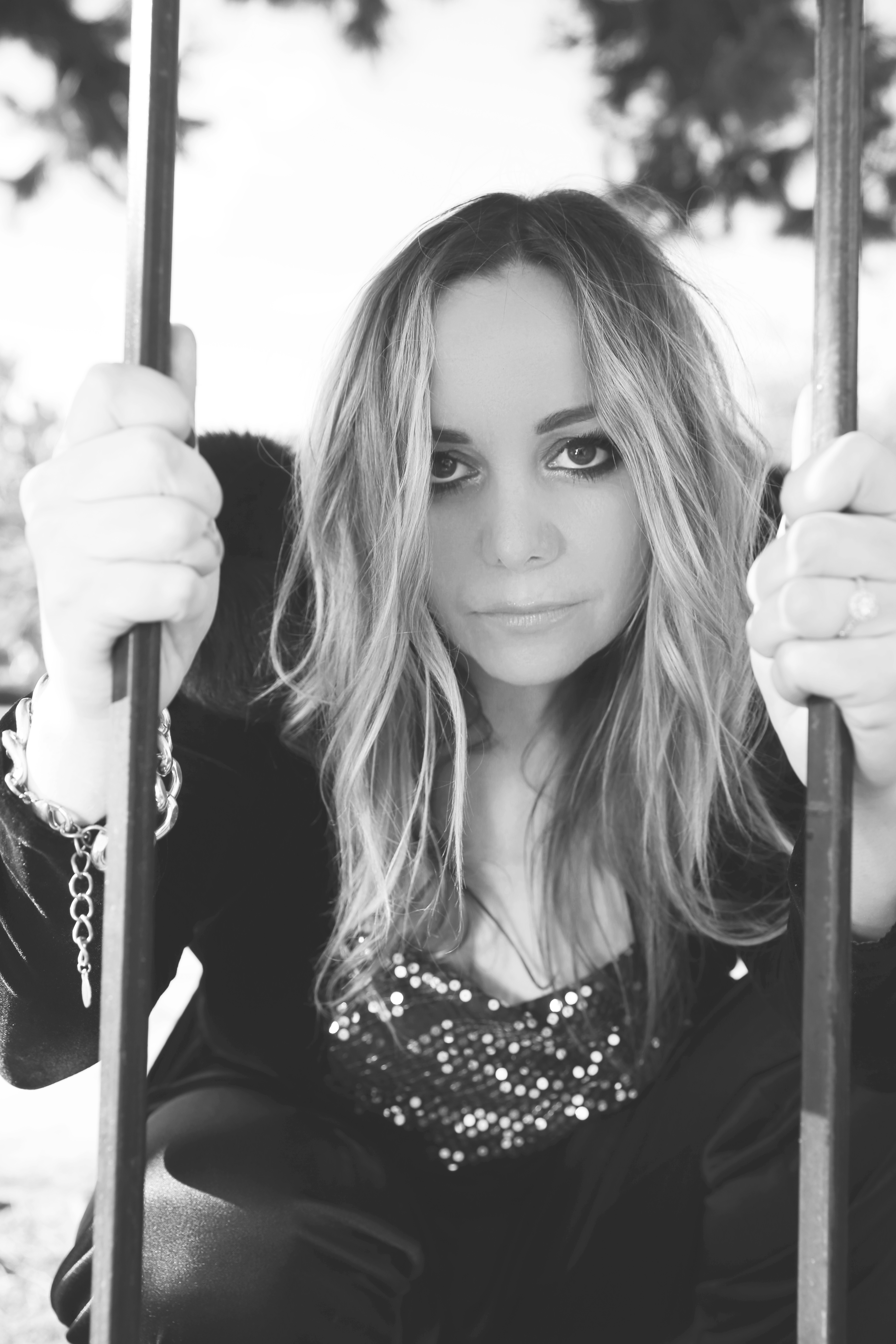
Tamra Keenan

Tamra Keenan is an Irish singer/songwriter. She has collaborated with many of the world's leading electronic dance music producers. Keenan also writes music for television and film, and writes lyrics for and collaborates with many other recording artists in most genres of popular music.

== Biography ==
Keenan moved to London at the age of 17 to pursue a career in music. After a few failed attempts at getting her demos heard with major labels, she started passing them out to DJs on the London Club scene. One of these demo tapes brought her to the attention of London-based Trance producer Blu Peter, with whom she recorded her first single, "Biological Response".

She then met producer Kevin Beber and they became the breakout breakbeat act Beber & Tamra. On the strength of their first white-label single "Traveling On", they signed with Mob Records. "Traveling On" became single of the week in NME and on BBC Radio 1. Their debut album received critical acclaim in major music magazines, including the cover of DJ Mag. After several Album of the Month honors, Beber & Tamra went on to tour Europe, including a killer debut set at Glastonbury Festival. The duo's follow-up album was delayed, so Tamra joined up with Glen Nicholls of the Future Funk Squad with whom she wrote and sang "Kissing Air" and "Demystified"; she also wrote Future Funk Squad's "Towards the Sun", which her brother Ben sang on.

After touring with Future Funk Squad across Europe and Asia, Keenan set her sights on recording her debut album which would be a return to her musical roots of folk, rock and blues, and a far cry from the breakbeat/synth acts she had worked with early on in her career.

With her new band assembled, she set about writing, recording and performing on the road, garnering the attention of legendary music mogul Derek Green of A&M and China Records. Despite teaming Keenan with guitar virtuoso Phil Manzanera of Roxy Music, Green struggled to get the album signed. Certainly ahead of its time, Keenan's blend of soulful rock and heartfelt lyrics didn't fit into the pop music landscape of the moment.

While continuing to pursue her solo project, Keenan was contacted by house music legend David Morales, who had been spinning "Traveling On" to sold-out crowds in his DJ sets across the globe. Entranced with Tamra's lyrics and vocals, Morales flew her to New York City where she collaborated on his second artist album, 2 Worlds Collide, writing and singing the title track as well as "You Came" and "Here I Am". Up-and-coming DJ/producer Kaskade's remix of the Morales/Keenan collaboration "Here I Am" reached #1 on the Dance Billboard Charts and was featured in the CBS television series The Beautiful Life and the Hollywood blockbuster film The Devil Wears Prada.

This relationship proved to be beneficial to both Keenan and Kaskade as she went on to write and sing "Your Love Is Black" and international club smash "Angel on My Shoulder" for his album Strobelite Seduction.

Keenan has written and recorded with Kaskade, David Morales, BT, Paul Oakenfold, EDX, Bad Boy Bill, Cedric Gervais, Steve Smooth, Tony Arzadon, Starkillers, Nick Terranova, Lenno and many more.

In 2013, Tamra teamed up with producer Andy Gray for TV and film placements with their songs feat on Channel 4 and BBC.

Tamra's anthem "Beautiful People" became the soundtrack to the Summerland Festival in Cartagena, Colombia in 2014.

Her collaborations with Kaskade have continued as well. His album Automatic features two songs written and performed by Keenan as follow-ups.

After a move to Los Angeles in December 2013, Keenan has carved out a niche in the realm of film and television also, penning the theme song for Nickelodeon's hit show Make It Pop with fifteen additional tracks over the first two seasons.

== Discography ==
=== Studio albums ===
- 2002: Suite Beat Boy – with Kevin Beber
- 2015: Tear Down These Walls – Kaskade (feat. Tamra Keenan) (Warner Music)
- 2015: Where Are You Now? – Kaskade (feat. Tamra Keenan) (Warner Music)
- 2018: Mama Ghost

=== Collaborations ===
- 2001: "Traveling On" – Beber & Tamra
- 2002: "YOU Wonder" – Beber & Tamra
- 2003: "Love in the Time of Thieves" – BT & Kevin Beber
- 2004: "Here I Am" – David Morales
- 2004: "U Came" – David Morales
- 2004: "2 Worlds Collide" – David Morales
- 2005: "Towards the Sun" – Future Funk Squad
- 2005: "De-Mystified" – Future Funk Squad
- 2005: "Kissing Air" – Future Funk Squad
- 2008: "Your Love Is Black" – Kaskade
- 2008: "Angel on My Shoulder" – Kaskade
- 2009: "Days" – Nick Terranova
- 2009: "Why" – Nick Terranova
- 2009: "Moments" – Nick Terranova & Austin Leeds
- 2009: "Calling" – Nick Terranova
- 2009: "Body Soul" – Nick Terranova
- 2009: "Underground" – Nick Terranova
- 2009: "Heartbleed" – Nick Terranova
- 2010: "Out of the Rain" – EDX
- 2011: "Knowing You" – Sergio Galoyan
- 2011: "You Take Me Here" – Steve Smooth
- 2012: "I'm Not Going Back" – Krystina Myles
- 2012: "Stalker" – Steve Smooth
- 2012: "All You & I" – Steve Smooth & Tony Arzadon
- 2012: "Unsaid" – Bad Boy Bill
- 2012: "I Don't Belong Here" – David Morales & Kaskade
- 2012: "Maybe It's Over" – Paul Oakenfold
- 2012: "Sleep" – Paul Oakenfold
- 2012: "Warrior" – EDX
- 2012: "2 Hearts, 1 Mind" – EDX
- 2013: "Beautiful People" – Moska & MYNC
- 2013: "7 Days" – David Morales
- 2013: "Lost in the City" – Inphinity & Kalendr
- 2013: "Just 3 Little Words – Kristyna Myles
- 2013: "Does He Love You Better" – Bo Saris
- 2014: "Temptation" – Greyson Chance
- 2015: "The Higher Ground" – Matt Simons
- 2015: "Changing Man" – The 3 J's
- 2016: "Soldier" – Blasterjaxx & Breathe Carolina
- 2017: "Sunrise Riot" – Ravell
- 2019: "Away From the Storm" – David Morales

=== Singles ===
- 2012: "Pontius Pilate" – Tamra Keenan (Blackhole)

=== Songs for TV and film ===
- 2006: "Here I Am" – The Devil Wears Prada
- 2008: "Here I Am" – CBS Beautiful Life
- 2015: Make It Pop – Nickelodeon
  - "Now I Am Here"
  - "Get It Right"
  - "Spotlightz"
  - "My Girls"
  - "Girls"
  - "The Rules"

== See also ==
- List of number-one dance hits (United States)
- List of artists who reached number one on the US Dance chart
