= Late Night Alumni =

American house music group

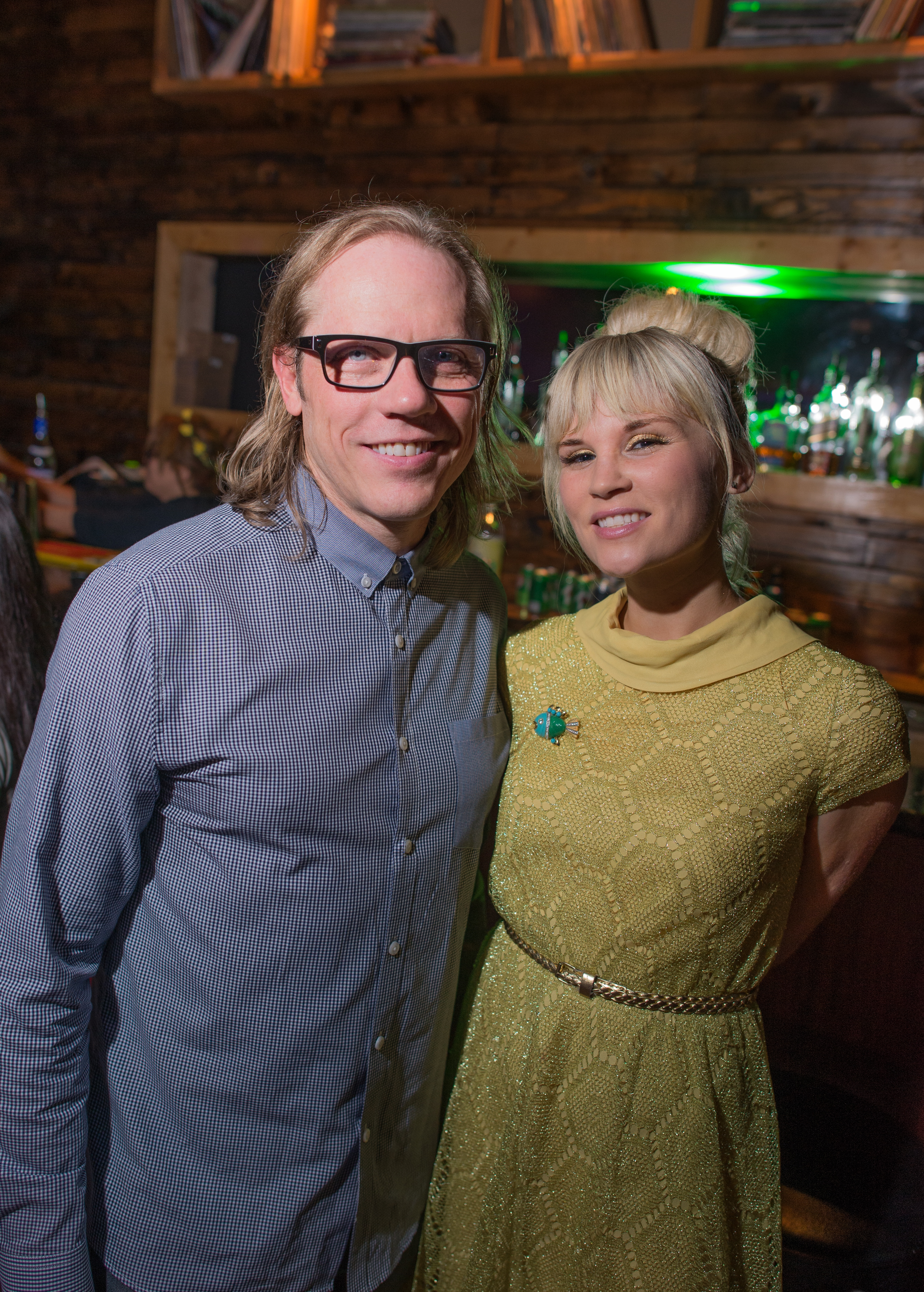
- Late Night Alumni at Nextdoor in Honolulu, Hawaii on October 10, 2014. (l-r: John Hancock, Becky Jean Williams)

Background information
- Also known as: Keyrah Kaskade
- Origin: Salt Lake City, Utah, U. S.
- Genres: House; downtempo; chill-out
- Years active: 2003–present
- Labels: Hed Kandi; Ultra Records; Arkade
- Members: Ryan Raddon; Finn Bjarnson; John Hancock; Becky Jean Williams
- Website: latenightalumni.com

Late Night Alumni is an American house group composed of Becky Jean Williams, John Hancock, Finn Bjarnson (Finnstagram), and Ryan Raddon (Kaskade). They are primarily known for mixing dance music with strings and soft trance-like vocals.

== Biography ==
Finn Bjarnson stumbled upon Becky Jean Williams (sister to R. John Williams, the lead singer of Faded Paper Figures) in the summer of 2003. “I had just been given a local Christmas CD that I had produced a couple tracks for,” Finn recalls, “and as I was listening through the tracks, there she was! Her beautiful voice and style immediately struck me.” A couple of phone calls later and they were in the studio together for the first time. “I had worked up this song called ‘Empty Streets’ and wanted to try her voice out on it...” Finn continues, “and it took off from there!”

Finn had already been working in the studio with Ryan Raddon (aka Kaskade) and soon Finn, Ryan, and Becky formed Late Night Alumni. In 2004, Hed Kandi made an offer to license and release a full-length Late Night Alumni album. “At that point,” Finn says, “I knew the band was not ready. We were missing an element.” That missing element turned out to be John Hancock.

== Empty Streets (2005–2008) ==
Empty Streets was released in September 2005. About the same time Hed Kandi was bought out by Ministry of Sound and the album got shelved. However, despite lack of support from the group's record label, it soon grew into an underground classic.

The single of the same name received massive support in both clubs and on radio, getting Top Ten Radio Play in the UK and EU, and reaching #1 in Spain. “Empty Streets” has also been licensed to commercials including a spot for the Toyota IQ. In addition, more than a dozen dance compilations have licensed the track, and it remains the most popular and downloaded song on Tiesto's “In Search Of Sunrise” compilation.

== Of Birds, Bees, Butterflies, Etc. (2009–2011) ==
Of Birds, Bees, Butterflies, Etc., the follow-up album to Empty Streets, was released as a digital download on November 3, 2009, with the physical CD released on February 2, 2010, on Ultra Records. On September 1, 2009, the group released "You Can Be The One," their first single from the album, which was available on Beatport & iTunes. This single was followed up with a remix by Sultan & Ned Shepard, which was released on September 22, 2009.

The second single from the album, "Finally Found", was released on December 22, 2009. It contains the original track, remixes by Max Vangeli and DJ Eco and a reprise of the song. A music video was released on March 16, 2010.

A music video for a live rendition of "You Can Be The One" was recorded at Velour in Utah. It features four violinists along with the four members of Late Night Alumni. Fans are comparing the video to Kaskade's live version of "4AM," which also features Becky Jean Williams on lead vocals and Finn Bjarnson on guitar.

An acoustic version of the song "Golden" and a live version of their track "What's in a Name" was also posted on their YouTube channel.

Two of their songs, "Uncharted" and "You Can Be the One", were featured in the film Crazy, Stupid, Love, which was released 29 June 2011.

== Haunted (2011) ==
Haunted was released as a digital download on February 8, 2011. During the recording process, the group hoped to create a different dynamic by physically working together through most of the process rather than being isolated and using electronic communication methods to collaborate. The name of the album was inspired by ideas of being haunted by nostalgia and memories from the past while dealing with change in the present, although the old character of the undisclosed location in Salt Lake City where they recorded may have also influenced the title.

Only one single has been released so far, "It's Not Happening".

A music video for the song "Main Street" was uploaded to YouTube on October 17, 2011.

The song "In The Ashes" was also well received, and is a fan favorite.

== The Beat Becomes A Sound (2012–2014) ==
The group released their fourth studio album, The Beat Becomes A Sound, through iTunes on January 29, 2013.

The first single, "Shine," was released earlier on September 18, 2012, and the remixes were released later on February 26, 2013. Ultra Records has uploaded the official music video to YouTube on October 3, 2012.

Singles after the album's release include "Sapphire" (May 28, 2013) and the Myon & Shane 54 remix of "Every Breath Is Like a Heartbeat" (September 3, 2013).

== Eclipse (2015–present) ==
The group released their fifth studio album "Eclipse" on June 6, 2015. The album has elements of electro-house and trance.

== Discography ==
=== Albums ===
- 2005 - Empty Streets
- 2009 - Of Birds, Bees, Butterflies, Etc.
- 2011 - Haunted
- 2013 - The Beat Becomes a Sound
- 2015 - Eclipse
- 2019 - Silver
- 2023 - Echos

=== Singles/EPs ===
Title

Empty Streets
I Knew You When
Another Chance (Kaskade Mix)
You Can Be The One (Single)
You Can Be The One (Sultan & Ned Shepard Remix)
You Can Be The One (EP)
You Can Be The One (Remixes)
Finally Found
Finally Found (Extended Mixes)
It's Not Happening
Shine
Shine (Remixes)
Sapphire (Remixes)
Every Breath Is Like a Heartbeat (Myon & Shane 54 Summer of Love Mix)
Love Song
Startled Heart (EP)
The Ghost (EP)
LOW, LOW Remixes (Single)

Label - Catalog Number

Hed Kandi – HEDK12013
Quiet City Recordings – QCR002
Quiet City Recordings – QCR008
Ultra Records – UL2202
Ultra Records – UL2256
Ultra Records – UL2320
Ultra Records – UL2273
Ultra Records – UL2363
Ultra Records – UL2366
Ultra Records – UL2767
Ultra Records – UL3513
Ultra Records – UL3542
Ultra Records – UL4046
Ultra Records – UL4549

Arkade – AA030-2, AA036, AA034, RIDE049

Arkade – AA043

Ride Recordings - RIDE071, RIDE076

Release Date

September 2005
January 17, 2006
September 24, 2008
September 1, 2009
September 22, 2009
October 27, 2009
November 17, 2009
December 22, 2009
January 19, 2010
January 11, 2011
September 18, 2012
February 26, 2013
May 28, 2013
September 3, 2013
2017
July 7, 2017
November 10, 2017

2019

=== Collaborations ===
- 2009 - "A Whole New World" (from the album House Disney by Peabo Bryson)
- 2012 - "How Long" (with Kaskade & Inpetto) (from the album Fire & Ice by Kaskade)
- 2013 - "Why Ask Why" (with Kaskade) (from the album Atmosphere by Kaskade)
- 2014 - "Under Your Cloud" (with Myon & Shane 54) (Ride/Blackhole Recordings)
- 2018 - "Hearts & Silence" with Myon (Ride/Blackhole Recordings, https://soundcloud.com/myonmuzik/tune-of-the-week-myon-x-late-night-alumni-hearts-silence-myon-club-mix)
- 2019 - "LOW" with Myon (Ride/Blackhole Recordings)

=== Remixes ===
- 2004 - Kaskade "Steppin' Out" (Late Night Alumni Slow Dance Mix)
- 2007 - Kaskade "Sometimes" (Late Night Alumni Mix)
- 2009 - Late Night Alumni "Finally Found" (LNA Reprise)
- 2011 - Late Night Alumni - Empty Streets (Haji & Emanuel Remix)
- 2013 - Kaskade "Raining" (Late Night Alumni Mix)
- 2013 - Polytype "Cyclone" (Late Night Alumni Remix)
- 2013 - Late Night Alumni - Every Breath Is Like a Heartbeat (Myon & Shane 54 Summer of Love Mix) (Ultra Records)
- 2014 - Ivan Gough & Feenixpawl feat. Christine Hoberg "Hear Me" (Late Night Alumni Remix)
- 2014 - Colette "Physically" (Late Night Alumni Remix)
- 2017 - Late Night Alumni - Love Song (Kaskade's Redux Mix) (https://soundcloud.com/arkade/late-night-alumni-love-song-kaskades-redux-remix)
- 2017 - Late Night Alumni - Montage (Mitiska Signature / Movement Machina Mix) (Ride/Blackhole Recordings)
- 2017 - Late Night Alumni - Only for Tonight (Fatum Signature Mix) (Ride/Blackhole Recordings)
- 2018 - Late Night Alumni - Love Song (Myon Definitive Mix) (Ride/Blackhole Recordings)
- 2019 - Late Night Alumni - Low (Myon Tales From Another World Mix) (Ride/Blackhole Recordings)
- 2019 - Late Night Alumni - Empty Streets (Alpha9 / Lumisade / Sean Darin / Jack Trades Remix) (Ride/Blackhole Recordings)
- 2020 - Late Night Alumni - Empty Streets (Parallels Remix / Myon's intro edit) (Ride/Blackhole Recordings)
- 2022 - Late Night Alumni - Empty Streets (Morgin Madison / Markus Schulz / Daniel Dash remix) (Ride/Blackhole Recordings)
- 2022 - Late Night Alumni - Beautiful (Myon x Hoten Tales From Another World Mix) (Ride/Blackhole Recordings)
- 2022 - Late Night Alumni - Wake Me Up (Myon x Kodyn Tales From Another World Mix) (Ride/Blackhole Recordings)
