= Kaskade =

American DJ and music producer (born 1971)

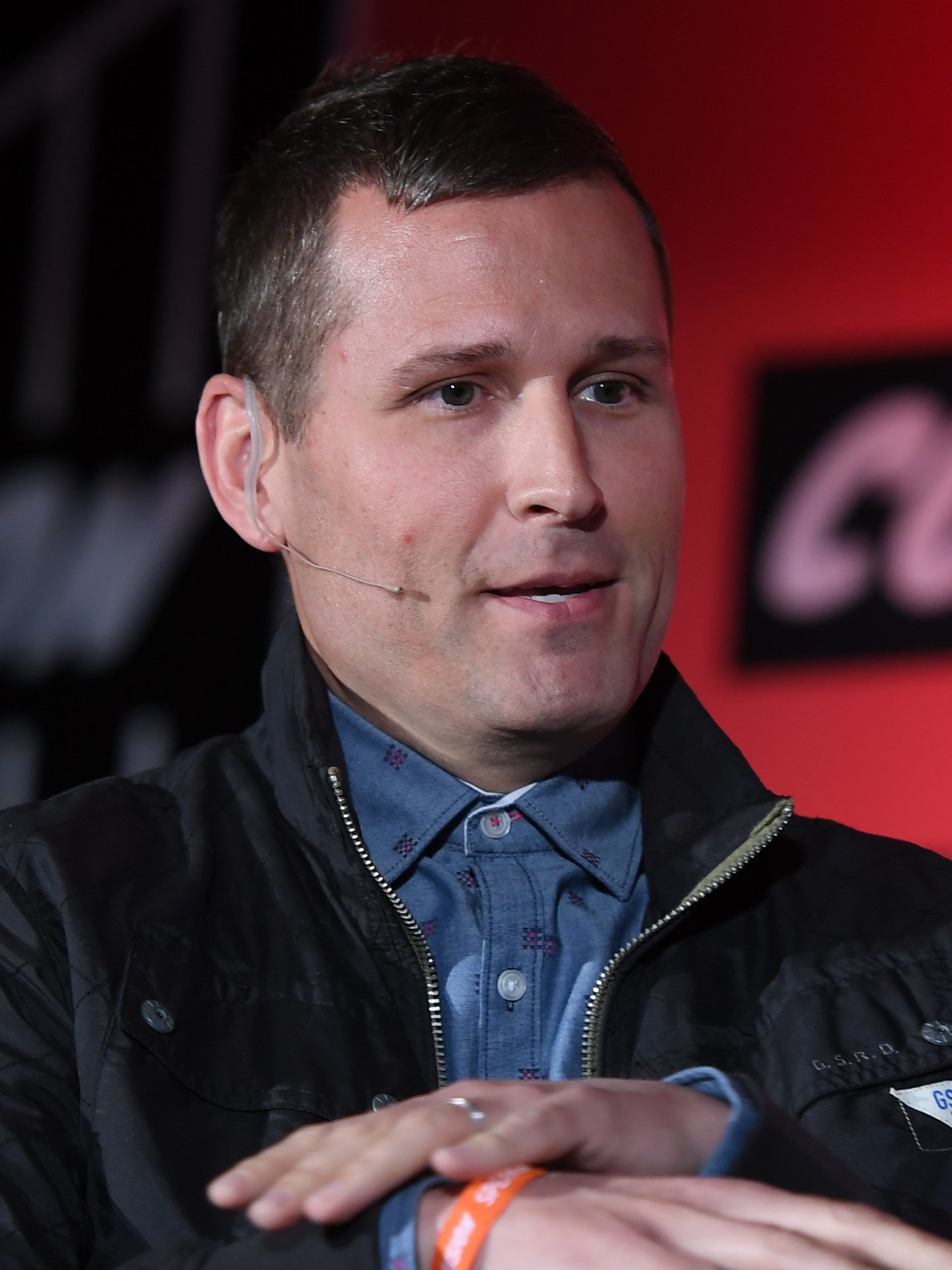
- Kaskade at Collision 2017 in New Orleans

Background information
- Also known as: Kaskade
- Born: Ryan Gary Raddon; February 25, 1971 (age 55); Chicago, Illinois, U.S.
- Genres: House; progressive house; electro house; deep house; downtempo; lo-fi
- Occupations: DJ; music producer; remixer
- Years active: 1995–present
- Labels: Om; Ultra; mau5trap; Ministry of Sound; Warner Bros.; Monstercat
- Member of: Kx5
- Spouse: Naomi Raddon (m. 1996; div. 2024)
- Website: kaskademusic.com

Signature
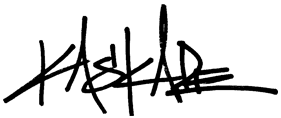

Ryan Gary Raddon (born February 25, 1971), better known by his stage name Kaskade, is an American DJ, songwriter, music producer and remixer. DJ Times voted Kaskade as "America's Best DJ" in 2011 and 2013. DJ Mag named Kaskade fifty-first on its 2009 list of Top 100 DJs.

== Early life ==
Born in Chicago, Kaskade grew up in nearby Northbrook and attended Glenbrook North High School. As a teenager, he bought music at Gramaphone Records on Clark Street in Chicago. His brother, Rich Raddon, became an entrepreneur and film producer. Ryan attended Brigham Young University in Provo, Utah from 1989 to 1990, working on DJ skills in his dorm room. At age 19, Ryan Raddon went on a two-year full-time mission for the Church of Jesus Christ of Latter-day Saints in Japan. Next he went to the University of Utah in Salt Lake City, eventually graduating with a degree in communications. While attending school, Kaskade and his close friend Jodi Call ran a record store in Salt Lake City called Mechanized.

== Career ==
=== 1995–2000: Early beginnings ===
In 1995, Raddon was a DJ at his first monthly Monday night party at a basement venue called Club Manhattan. He used the additional income to purchase studio essentials. In May 2000, Raddon moved to San Francisco with his wife where he got a job working as an A&R assistant to John Elkins at Om Records, a house and electronic label. To Raddon's benefit, San Francisco was an emerging site of a new deep house movement. While at OM records he continued DJing and producing music. Soon after, Raddon created his alter ego, Kaskade, which his wife worried would remind people of the dish detergent. He took his stage name from a nature book when he saw a picture of a waterfall and a co-worker agreed "cascade" was a good choice, but he changed the spelling. His name is not from the Cascade Range in the Pacific Northwest as fans sometimes cite.

After mixing the third volume in the Sounds of Om series, Ryan was offered a three-album deal for Kaskade. He kicked off the deal with a full-length house debut, It's You, It's Me. Garnering critical acclaim, spawning several singles, and receiving a prestigious Dance Star nomination for Best New Artist, the release put Kaskade squarely on the dance music world's radar. Concentrating on his DJing skills, Kaskade started to experiment and develop his own sound.

=== 2001–2006: Debut single ===
Kaskade released his first single "What I Say" on the label in 2001. In the Moment was Kaskade's first top 10 single with "Steppin' Out" reaching No. 5 on Billboard Magazine's Hot Dance Club Play chart and No. 6 on Dance Radio Airplay. The fourth single to be released from the album, "Everything", reached No. 1 on Billboard Magazine's Hot Dance Club Play.

Kaskade's fourth solo album Love Mysterious was released in September 2006. The first single from the album, "Be Still", reached No. 4 on Billboard Magazine's Hot Dance Club Play. The single features vocalist Sunsun, and includes remixes by Jay-J and Robbie Rivera. Follow up single "Stars Align" hit number No. 8 on "Billboard Magazine" Hot Dance Airplay chart and just missed the top ten, No. 11, on the Hot Dance Club Play chart. His fourth single released from "Love Mysterious", "Sorry", was his third consecutive top ten hit on Billboard's Hot Dance Airplay Chart, at No. 9. Dirty South provided a remix for "Sorry". The remix was nominated for a 2008 Grammy for Best Remixed Recording.

=== 2006–2009: Ultra Records and Deadmau5 ===
In late 2006, Kaskade left OM Records and signed with Ultra Records. He worked with electronic musician Deadmau5 from Niagara Falls, Ontario, to produce tracks on the album Strobelite Seduction, including the first single (released as an EP) "Move for Me". The single became his fifth top ten hit on Billboard's Hot Dance Airplay Chart, reaching the number one position in its September 6, 2008 issue. It also gave Kaskade his first number one single on this chart. The dance single became a crossover hit and reached number 71 on the Canadian Hot 100 as of February 14, 2009. "I Remember", another collaboration with Deadmau5, became his first UK hit, peaking inside the top 15 on the UK Singles Chart. The video-clip which accompanied "I Remember" was filmed in Manchester, England. The single became his second chart topper on the Billboard dance chart. The follow-up single, "Angel on My Shoulder" with Tamra Keenan, was also a success on the dance chart, placing fifth on Billboard's Hot Dance Airplay Chart. His song "Step One Two" was the last single from the album, being released late in 2008.

=== 2010–2015: Headlining UMF and Grammy nominations ===
In 2010, he had another number one Billboard Hot Dance Airplay track with "Dynasty", featuring Haley Gibby on vocals. In March 2012, Kaskade headlined at Ultra Music Festival in Miami performing before Armin van Buuren on Sunday night.

In April 2012, Kaskade played two weekends at Coachella Festival in Indio, California. In June 2012, he was one of the headlining acts at Electric Daisy Carnival in Las Vegas. Also in June 2012, he started the "Freaks of Nature" summer tour in support of his released album Fire & Ice. In December 2013, Kaskade was nominated for two Grammy Awards: the song "Atmosphere" for Best Dance Recording and the album Atmosphere for Best Dance/Electronica Album. In 2014, Kaskade was listed as the No. 8 highest paid DJ in the world according to Forbes, earning $17 million.

In 2015, he appeared on BYUtv's Studio C. Additionally in 2015, he headlined Coachella alongside Drake for two weekends and, over the course of the two weekends, pulled in the two largest crowds the festival had ever seen.

=== 2015–present: Automatic, Kaskade Christmas and Kx5 ===
On September 25, 2015, Kaskade released his album Automatic featuring collaborations with CID, Galantis, John Dahlbäck and Two Nations. On November 24, 2017, Kaskade released a Christmas-themed album titled "Kaskade Christmas". In 2022, Kaskade and Deadmau5 announced a collaboration project named Kx5, marking the fourth time the producers have worked together. The first single from the project, "Escape", was released on March 11. On January 27, 2023, Deadmau5 announced the self-titled album, Kx5, would be released March 17, 2023.

On November 17, 2023, Kaskade released his second Christmas-themed album titled Kaskade Christmas Volume 2. On February 11, 2024, he performed at Super Bowl LVIII in Las Vegas both before and during the game, making him the first DJ to perform throughout the Super Bowl. He replaced Tiësto, who dropped out after a family emergency.

== Other projects ==
On May 30, 2010, Kaskade became a resident DJ for daytime pool parties at Encore Beach Club in Las Vegas. The parties were entitled "Kaskade Sundays". On March 26, 2021, he had a virtual event happen in the popular video game Fortnite.

== Personal life ==
Raddon has three children from his previous marriage. He is a member of the Church of Jesus Christ of Latter-day Saints. His net worth was estimated to be US$50 million as of 2023, making him one of the Top 20 highest net worth DJ/producers in the world.

On October 17, 2024, it was reported on TMZ that Raddon's wife Naomi filed for divorce, ending their relationship of 28 years.

== Discography ==
- It's You, It's Me (2003)
- In the Moment (2004)
- The Calm (2006)
- Love Mysterious (2006)
- Strobelite Seduction (2008)
- Dynasty (2010)
- Fire & Ice (2011)
- Atmosphere (2013)
- Automatic (2015)
- Kaskade Christmas (2017)
- Kaskade Christmas II (2023)
- Kx5 (with Deadmau5) (2023)
- Undux (2025)
- Origin (2026)

== Official tours ==
- Urban Tour (2011)
- Freaks of Nature Tour (2012)
- United States Formula 1 Grand Prix Weekend (2012)
- It's You, It's Me Redux Tour (2013)
- Atmosphere Tour (2013)
- Redux Tour 001(2014)
- Automatic Tour (2015)
- Redux 002 (2017)
- Redux 003 (2019)

== Awards and nominations ==
=== Grammy Awards ===
Year	Nominee / work	Award	Result
2013	Fire & Ice	Best Dance/Electronica Album	Nominated
2014	Atmosphere	Best Dance/Electronica Album	Nominated
2014	"Atmosphere"	Best Dance Recording	Nominated
2015	"Smile (Kaskade Edit)"	Best Remixed Recording, Non-Classical	Nominated
2016	"Runaway (U & I) (Kaskade Remix)"	Best Remixed Recording, Non-Classical	Nominated
2017	"Only (Kaskade x Lipless Remix)"	Best Remixed Recording, Non-Classical	Nominated
2019	Stargazing (Kaskade Remix)	Best Remixed Recording, Non-Classical	Nominated

=== America's Best DJ Award ===
Year	Place
2009	4th
2010	2nd
2011	1st
2013	1st
2015	2nd
2016	2nd
2017	6th

== See also ==
- Om Records
- List of number-one dance hits (United States)
- List of artists who reached number one on the US Dance chart
- List of artists who reached number one on the U.S. dance airplay chart
