= Rezz discography =

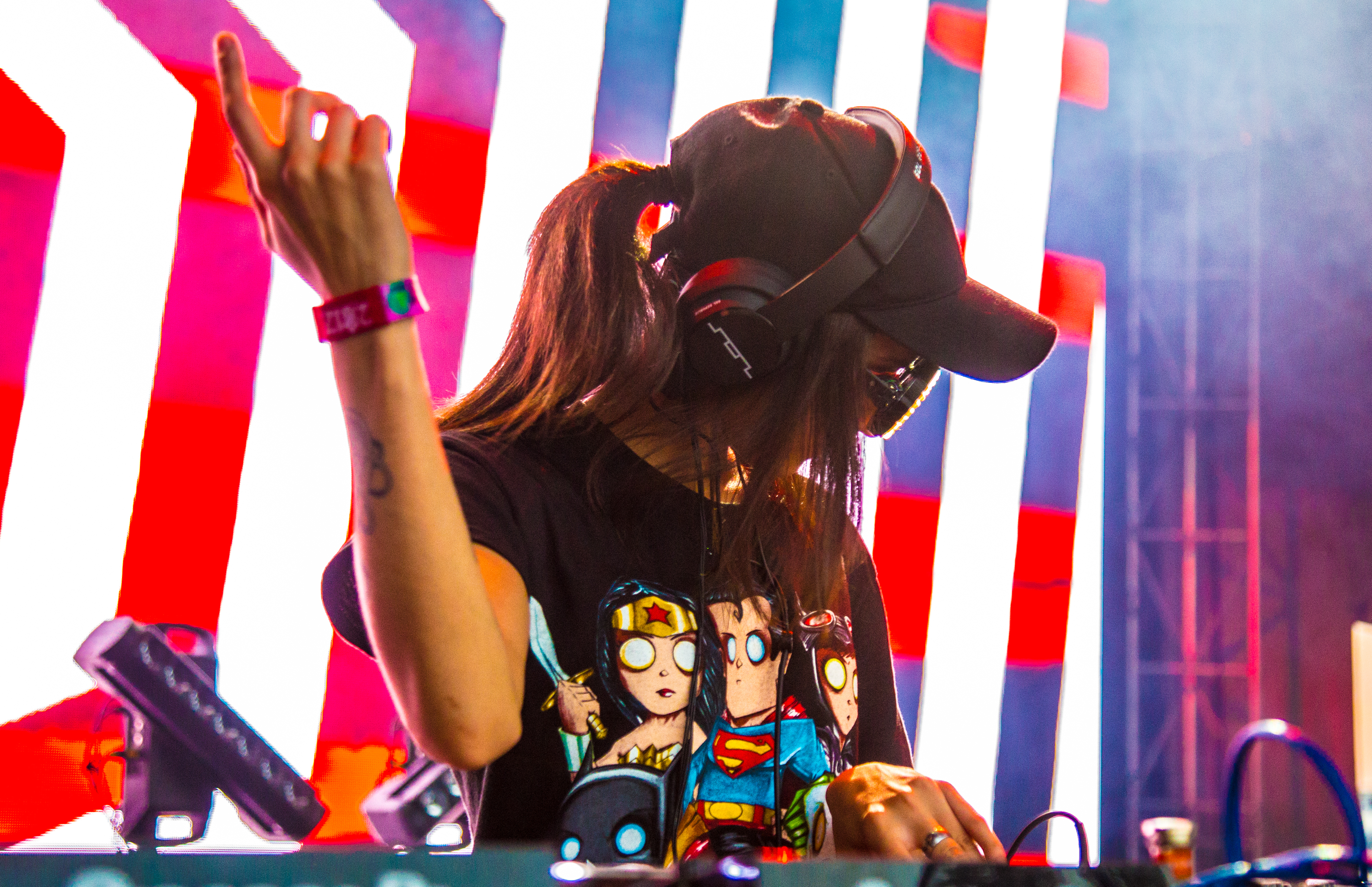
- Rezz at Bonnaroo in 2017
- Studio albums: 3
- EPs: 6
- Singles: 38
- Music videos: 9
- Remixes: 8

Ukrainian–Canadian record producer and DJ Rezz has released four studio albums, five extended plays (EPs), and 38 singles. Her 2015 debut EP was released through Owsla's subsidiary Nest HQ. Afterwards, her music was released through the independent record label mau5trap, her own HypnoVizion Records, and most recently RCA Records.

Her 2016 EP Something Wrong Here was her first project to chart, peaking at number 18 on the Billboard US Dance chart. Her first three studio albums, Mass Manipulation (2017), Certain Kind of Magic (2018), and Spiral (2021), all subsequently charted on the US Dance chart as well. The latter peaked at number 6, making it Rezz's highest-charting album. In 2024, she released Can You See Me? through her own HypnoVizion Records imprint.

== Studio albums ==
Title	Information	Peak chart positions		
Title	Information	US Dance	US Heat.	US Ind.
Mass Manipulation	Released: 4 August 2017; Label: Mau5trap; Formats: CD, digital download, vinyl, streaming	16	14	30
Certain Kind of Magic	Released: 3 August 2018; Label: Mau5trap; Formats: Digital download, vinyl	12	8	19
Spiral	Released: 19 November 2021; Label: RCA Records; Formats: Digital download, streaming	6	13	—
Can You See Me?	Released: 14 March 2024; Label: HypnoVizion Records; Formats: Digital download, streaming	—	—	—
As the Pendulum Swings	Released: 12 September 2025; Label: HypnoVizion Records; Formats: Digital download, streaming	—	—	—
"—" denotes a recording that did not chart or was not released in that territory.

== Extended plays ==
Title	Information	Charts
Title	Information	US Dance
Insurrection	Released: 20 July 2015; Label: Owsla / NEST HQ; Formats: Digital download	—
The Silence Is Deafening	Released: 22 January 2016; Label: Mau5trap; Formats: Digital download	—
Something Wrong Here	Released: 7 October 2016; Label: Mau5trap; Formats: Digital download	18
Beyond the Senses	Released: 24 July 2019; Label: Rezz Music / RCA; Formats: Digital download, vinyl	—
It's Not a Phase	Released: 20 July 2023; Label: HypnoVizion Records; Formats: Digital download, vinyl	—
Novus (with X1-Y2)	Released: 18 October 2024; Label: HypnoVizion Records; Formats: Digital download, vinyl	—
A Shift In Perspective	Released: 8 April 2026; Label: HypnoVizion Records; Formats: Digital download, vinyl	—
"—" denotes a recording that did not chart or was not released in that territory.

== Singles ==
Title	Year	Peak chart positions		Album
Title	Year	NZ Hot	US Dance	Album
"Alien" (with Raito)	2016	—	—	Non-album singles
"Fourth Impact" (with K?d)	2017	—	—	Non-album singles
"Psycho" (with Isqa)	2017	—	—	Non-album singles
"I"	2017	—	—	Non-album singles
"Silent Hill"	2017	—	—	Non-album singles
"Relax"	2017	—	—	Mass Manipulation
"Diluted Brains"	2017	—	—	Mass Manipulation
"Premonition" (with Knodis)	2017	—	—	Mass Manipulation
"Drugs!" (with 13)	2017	—	—	Mass Manipulation
"Witching Hour"	2018	—	—	Certain Kind of Magic
"Hex" (with 1788-L)	2018	—	—	Certain Kind of Magic
"Flying Octopus"	2018	—	—	Certain Kind of Magic
"Mixed Signals" (with Blanke)	2018	—	—	Non-album single
"Dark Age"	2019	—	—	Beyond the Senses
"Falling" (featuring Underoath)	2019	—	—	Beyond the Senses
"Kiss of Death" (with Deathpact)	2019	—	—	Beyond the Senses
"Criminals" (with Malaa)	2019	—	—	Non-album singles
"Hell on Earth" (with Yultron)	2019	—	—	Non-album singles
"Into the Abyss" (with Zeds Dead)	2020	—	47	Non-album singles
"Someone Else" (with Grabbitz)	2020	—	16	Non-album singles
"Orbit"	2020	—	—	Non-album singles
"Sacrificial" (with Pvris)	2021	—	—	Spiral
"Hypnocurrency" (with Deadmau5)	2021	35	14	Non-album single
"Taste of You" (featuring Dove Cameron)	2021	—	26	Spiral
"Chemical Bond" (with Deathpact)	2021	—	29	Spiral
"Let Me In" (with Fknsyd)	2021	—	43	Spiral
"Menace"	2022	—	50	Non-album singles
"Puzzle Box" (with Subtronics)	2022	—	22	Non-album singles
"Sweet Dreams (Are Made of This)" (with fknsyd)	2022	—	42	Non-album singles
"Gyrate" (with Quackson and Wreckno)	2023	—	33	Non-album singles
"Suffer in Silence"	2023	—	27	Non-album singles
"Blue in the Face" (with Shadient & fknsyd)	2023	—	—	It's Not a Phase
"Signal" (with Grabbitz)	2023	—	—	It's Not a Phase
"Embers" (with Raven Gray)	2023	—	—	It's Not a Phase
"Infraliminal" (with deadmau5 as Rezzmau5)	2023	—	—	Can You See Me?
"All Night" (with Nghtmre and DeathbyRomy)	2023	—	—	Non-album singles
"Black Ice" (with Subtronics)	2024	—	41	Can You See Me?
"Dysphoria" (with Holly)	2024	—	—	Can You See Me?
"Can You See Me?"	2024	—	—	Can You See Me?
"Everywhere, Nowhere" (with Blanke)	2024	—	—	Can You See Me?
"Black Ice" (with Subtronics featuring Phantogram)	2024	—	—	Non-album singles
"Edge" (2024 version)	2024	—	—	Non-album singles
"Give In To You" (with Virtual Riot and One True God)	2024	—	—	Stealing Fire
"Contorted"	2025	—	—	As The Pendulum Swings
"Telepathy" (with Chuurch)	2025	—	—	As The Pendulum Swings
"Prophecy"	2025	—	—	As The Pendulum Swings
"Glass Veins" (with Cable)	2025	—	—	As The Pendulum Swings
"Downward" (with Owl Vision)	2025	—	—	As The Pendulum Swings
"Selector" (2025 Remake)	2025	—	—	Auditory Illusion Vol. 1
"Circuit" (with Limbo Slice)	2026	—	—	A Shift In Perspective
"SICK FUCK"	2026	—	—	A Shift In Perspective
"In The Mirror" (with Colleen D'Agostino)	2026	—	—	Non-album single
"—" denotes a recording that did not chart or was not released.

=== As featured artist ===
Title	Year	Album
"Love You Till I'm Dead" (Grabbitz featuring Rezz)	2025	Big Epic Nothing

=== Guest appearances ===
Title	Year	Album
"Entropy" (Anyma & Rezz featuring fknsyd)	2025	The End Of Genesys

== Remixes ==
Title	Year	Original artist(s)	Album
"This Is the New Shit"	2015	Marilyn Manson	Non-album remixes
"Conquistador"	2015	Jean-Michel Jarre and Gesaffelstein	Non-album remixes
"Without a Trace"	2016	Kill the Noise	Non-album remixes
"Slip"	2016	Deadmau5	Non-album remixes
"Clear"	2017	No Mana and Zashanell	Non-album remixes
"I Could Be Anything"	2018	The Glitch Mob (featuring Elohim)	Non-album remixes
"Divinity"	2018	Porter Robinson	Non-album remixes
"Violence"	2020	Grimes and I_o	Non-album remixes
"Edge" (with X1-Y2)	2024	Rezz	Edge (The Remixes)

== Music videos ==
Title	Year	Director(s)
"Paranoid"	2016	Alison Honey
"Relax"	2017	Tyler Hynes
"Premonition" (with knodis)	2017	Luis Colindres
"Flying Octopus"	2018	Aoífe Doyle and Stefan Grambart
"Falling" (featuring Underøath)	2019	Colin G. Cooper
"Taste of You" (featuring Dove Cameron)	2021	Felicity Jayn Heath
"Let Me In" (with Fknsyd)	2021	Biagio Musacchia
"Out of My Head" (with Shadow Cliq)	2022	Ruben Frosali
"All Night" (with NGHTMRE & DeathbyRomy)	2023	—
"Delirium" (with isqa & fknsyd)	2025	IAMMASKARADE
