= Rezzmau5 =

Canadian electronic music duo

- Origin: Niagara Falls, Ontario
- Genres: Electronic
- Years active: 2021–present
- Members: Rezz; Deadmau5

Rezzmau5 (pronounced "rezz-mouse" and stylized in all caps) is a Canadian electronic music supergroup composed of musicians Rezz and Deadmau5.

Deadmau5 and Rezz are both Canadian electronic music producers and DJs whose musical styles span EDM. In the mid-2010s, Rezz began making her own music, inspired to do so in part by Deadmau5, who had been highly influential to electronic dance music prior. Rezz later began releasing music through Deadmau5's Mau5trap label in 2015. In 2021, the two released their first formal musical collaboration as Rezzmau5, and in 2023, the duo performed together as Rezzmau5 for the first time.

== History ==
=== Background ===
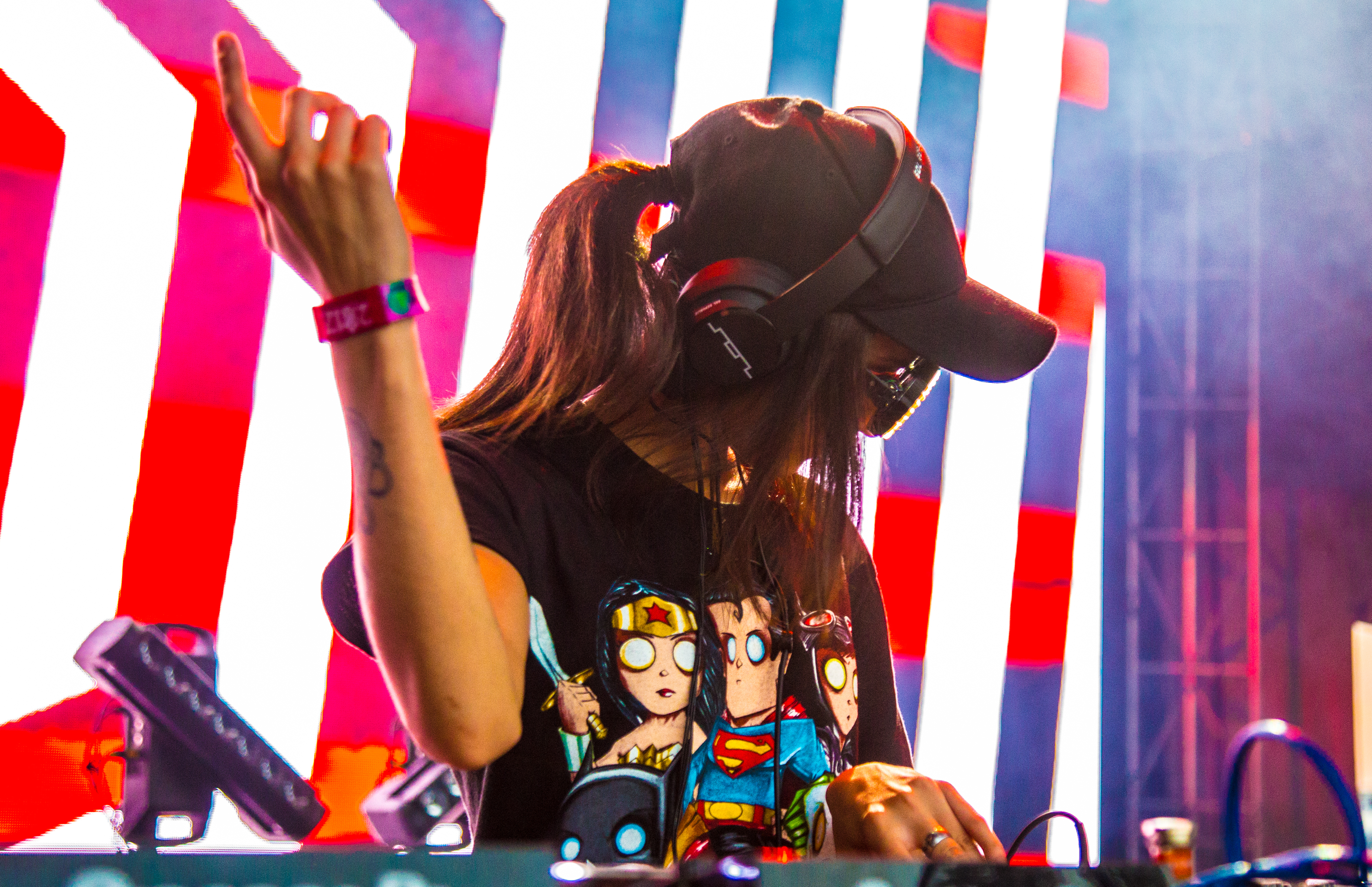
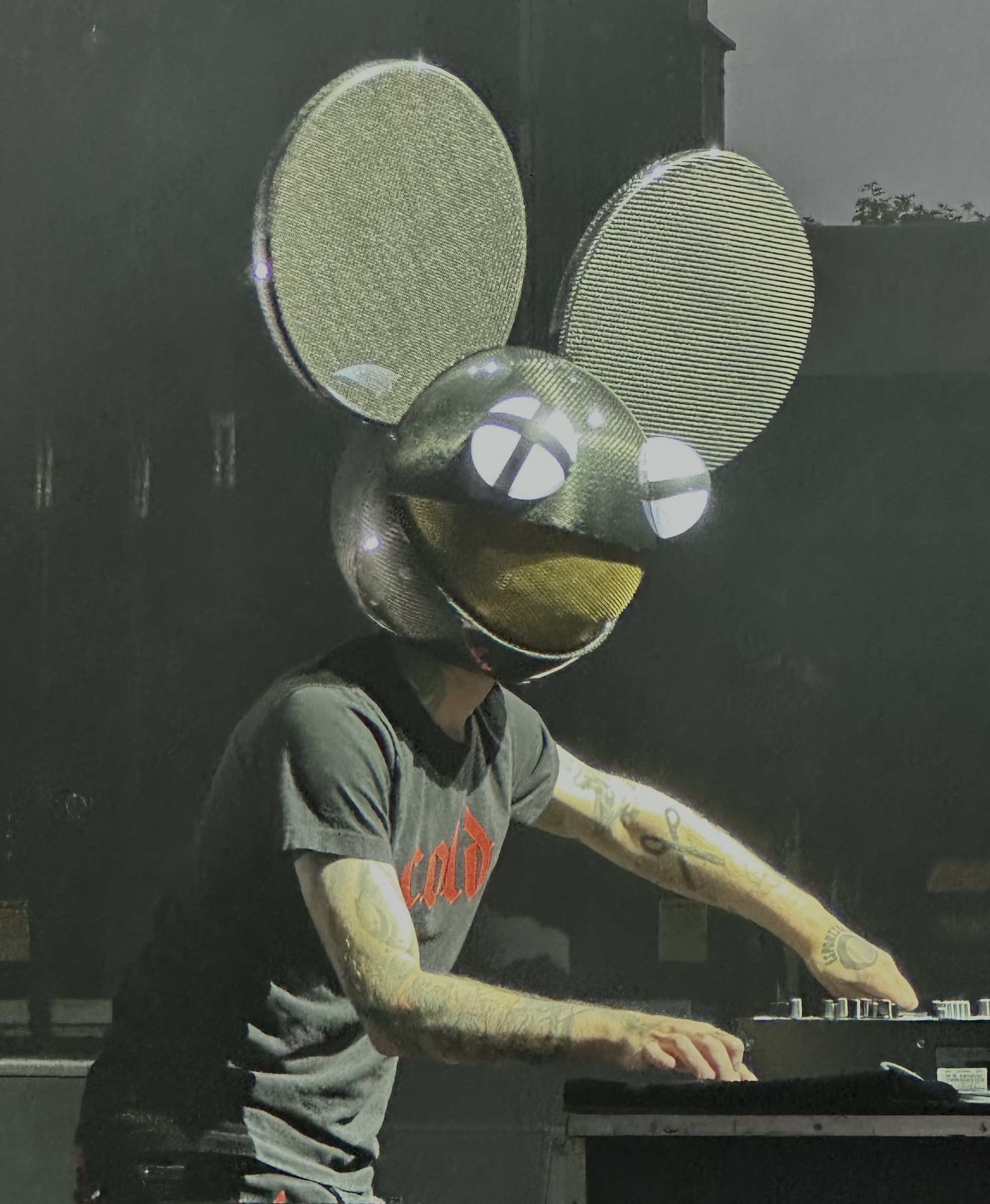
Rezz (top) and Deadmau5 (bottom)

Deadmau5 and Rezz are both electronic music producers from Niagara Falls, Ontario, having produced music since the 1990s and the 2010s, respectively. Deadmau5 attained notoriety in the electronic dance music scene after releasing Random Album Title in 2008, and he went on to release several more successful albums, strongly influencing modern EDM. At the same time, Rezz began DJing in her adolescence, before her experience at a Deadmau5 concert inspired her to create her own music. In an interview with Vice, she stated that a main moment in her early production work was when she "immediately jumped onto Ableton" after viewing a Deadmau5 livestream.

Attlas, a fellow Canadian DJ and electronic music producer, found Rezz's music and sent it to the label manager of Mau5trap, which was founded by Deadmau5. Rezz's track "Serenity" then appeared on We Are Friends, Vol. 4, a 2015 compilation album released by Mau5trap. She joined Mau5trap in 2016, and would release two extended plays (The Silence Is Deafening and Something Wrong Here) through the label that year. Her first two studio albums (2017's Mass Manipulation and 2018's Certain Kind of Magic) were also released through Mau5trap. Deadmau5 and Rezz performed together, alongside other Mau5trap labelmates for the label's tenth anniversary showcase, held at Toronto's Rebel venue in 2017.

In May 2018, a collaboration between the two was first teased when Deadmau5 shared an audio snippet on Instagram, mentioning Rezz in the post's caption. Later that September, Rezz shared that she was working on music at Deadmau5's studio and shared a post of her own with the caption "rezzmau5".

=== As Rezzmau5 ===
Shortly following a related NFT release, the two released their first collaborative single in April 2021, titled "Hypnocurrency". In January 2023, a couple months after hinting at a joint performance, the duo officially announced their first back-to-back performance under the Rezzmau5 name would be held later that August at the VELD Music Festival in Canada.

On 13 October, the duo released "Infraliminal". In the works since 2018, the single was a rework of Deadmau5's previous "Superliminal" from 2012. Rezz has cited the original "Superliminal" as the specific inspiration for beginning her music career. "Infraliminal - Isabelle's Version", an alternate version of the 2023 rework, was included on Rezz's 2024 album Can You See Me?.

They performed together again at the HiJinx event in Philadelphia, in December 2023, and later in July 2024, when the duo closed out the Freedom Stage at Tomorrowland. The two performed at the Hard Summer Music Festival in August. In June 2025, Billboard's Richard Trapunski wrote that Deadmau5 had teased "Atri", a new collaboration between the two. Rezz started the project on Ableton, though some of the project's ideas could only be executed through Cubase, leading to the duo to shift between the two programs.

== Artistry ==
Both Deadmau5 and Rezz are electronic music producers, with the former known for "progressive synth work and overall immersive soundscapes". Rezz has been cited as a midtempo, and later, downtempo artist, incorporating heavy bass into her music. Deadmau5's music is characterized by its comparatively faster tempo, with many of his more notable songs featuring a tempo of 128 BPM (beats per minute). After collaborating with Rezz, Deadmau5 quipped in an interview with Billboard, that he "learned that there are BPMs that actually do exist below 128."

In a 2025 Billboard interview, Trapunski wrote that despite technological advancements in digital audio workstations (DAW), Deadmau5 "maintains much of his analogue approach", while Rezz "is much more digital." In the interview, the duo directly described their artistic differences and Deadmau5 explained that Rezz uses "her computer and her controller, very minimal hardware", whereas he would "hardly ever touch my computer unless I'm editing waveforms or recording and arranging", also explaining that he prefers analogue synthesizers.

DJ Mag Latinoamérica noted that Deadmau5's original "Superliminal" included "signature rhythmic beats, pulsing synths, and atmospheric chords" that were indeed revisited on "Infraliminal". Karlie Powell of Your EDM wrote that the duo's "Hypnocurrency" balanced both artists' signature styles and featured "eerie, hypnotic tones, and textures."

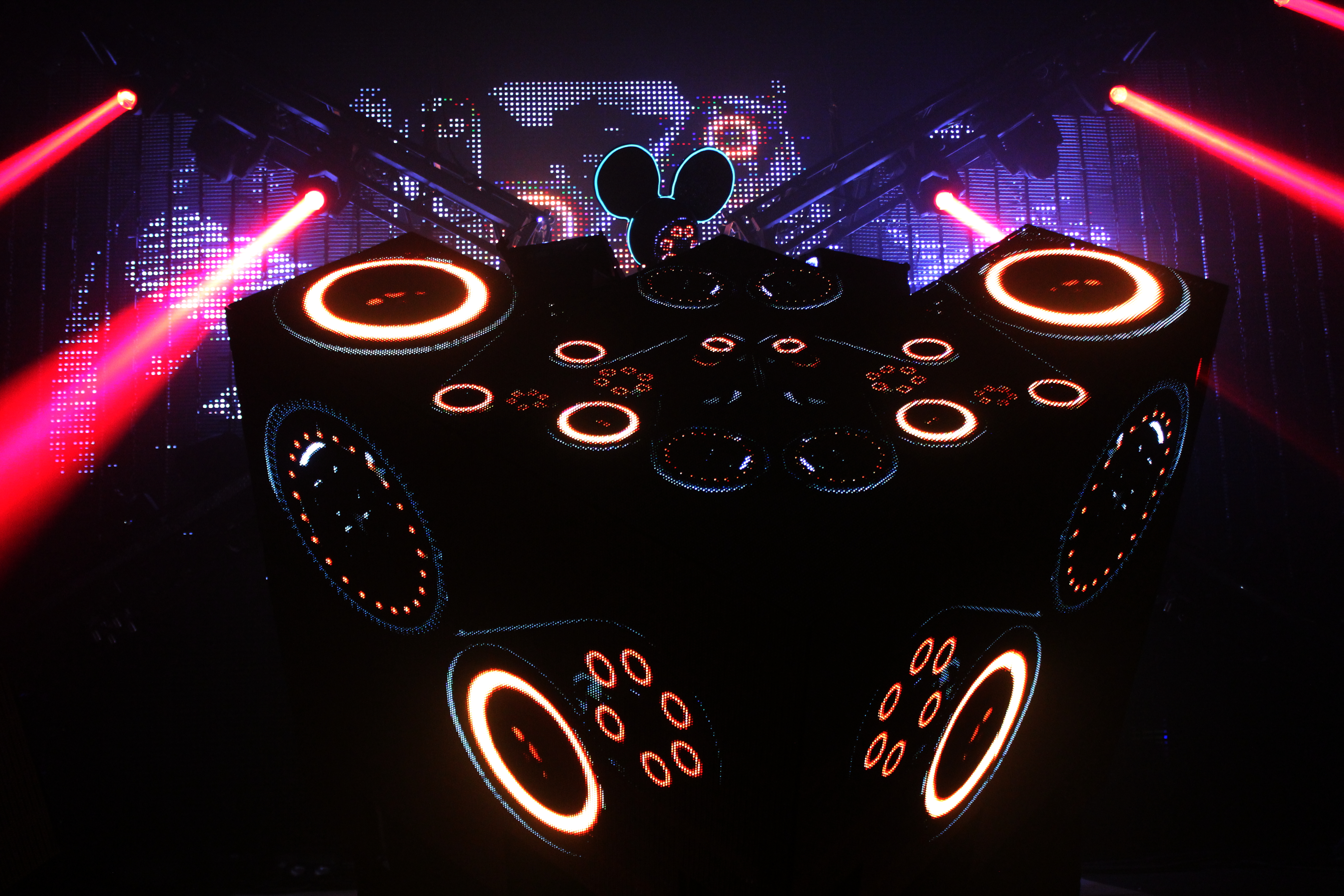
Deadmau5 performing with the Cube at the Austin Music Hall, 2011

The duo's live performances are accompanied by hypnotic-styled visual production. Rezz's live "portal shows" are "built around a massive circular screen with trance-like lighting and visuals" and draw influence from "The Cube", Deadmau5's former stage design that resembled half a cube, which used over 600 LED panels and custom technology to operate.

== Discography ==
=== Appearances together ===
List of singles as lead artists, with selected chart positions, showing year released and album name
Title	Year	Peak chart positions		Album
Title	Year	US Dance	US Dig	Album
"Hypnocurrency"	2021	14	10	Non-album singles
"Infraliminal"	2023	—	—	Non-album singles
"Infraliminal - Isabelle's Version"	2024	—	—	Can You See Me?
