= Flying Octopus (song) =

Single by Rezz

from the album Certain Kind of Magic
- Released: 19 July 2018
- Length: 2:59
- Label: Mau5trap
- Songwriter: Isabelle Rezazadeh
- Producer: Isabelle Rezazadeh

Rezz singles chronology
"Hex" (2018)	"Flying Octopus" (2018)

"Flying Octopus" is a song by Canadian electronic music producer Rezz, released by Canadian record label Mau5trap on 19 July 2018 as the third single from her second studio album Certain Kind of Magic.

== Background and release ==
On 18 July 2018, Rezazadeh released a 48-second long teaser of her then upcoming song "Flying Octopus" via her Twitter account. On 19 July, Rezazadeh released the song as a digital download alongside a music video. The music video featured an octopus and friends constructing a submarine to escape the ocean depths to fly to Rezz on Neptune. The music video was produced by Irish animation studio Pink Kong Studios. Upon release, Rezazadeh commented about the song, writing "It's very chill. Not headbang worthy by any means, more like 'building a puzzle' music or like a bunch of flying octopus' floating around..."

The song was released as part of Rezazadeh's second studio album titled Certain Kind of Magic released on 3 August 2018. It was the third track on the album, which also includes seven other songs.

== Critical reception ==
Grace Fleisher of Dancing Astronaut noted that the music video leans heavily on a lighthearted message of camaraderie, which she wrote had aligned "perfectly with the Mass Manipulation producer's cult fan base." Writing for Your EDM, Matthew Meadow noted that the song was much more relaxed when compared to Rezazadeh's previous works, writing that because of the slower tempo that the song was written in (around 80 to 90 beats per minute), the song was one of the most atmospheric tracks she had produced yet.

== Track listing ==
Digital download
No.	Title	Length
1.	"Flying Octopus"	2:59
Total length:		2:59

== Credits and personnel ==
Credits adapted from the music video of "Flying Octopus" on YouTube:

Music Video

- Production Company – The Field Inc.
- Exec. Producer – Cherie Sinclair
- Director – Aoífe Doyle and Stefan Grambart
- Label – Mau5trap Venture Limited

Song personnel

- Songwriting and Production – Isabelle Rezazadeh

== Release history ==
Region	Date	Format	Version	Label	Ref.
Worldwide	19 July 2018	Digital download	"Flying Octopus" - Single	Mau5trap	
Worldwide	3 August 2018	Digital download	Certain Kind of Magic	Mau5trap	
