= Sentient (disambiguation) =

Sentience is the ability to perceive subjectively.

Sentient may also refer to:

- Sentient (intelligence analysis system), a classified artificial intelligence–powered satellite-based intelligence analysis system of the National Reconnaissance Office of the United States Intelligence Community
- Sentient computing, a form of ubiquitous computing which uses sensors to perceive its environment and react accordingly
- Sentient Information Systems, a Dutch software company specialized in data mining
- Sentient diet, also referred to as Sattvic diet

== Video games ==
- Sentient (video game), a videogame developed by Psygnosis in 1997 for the PlayStation and PC
- Sentients, an alien race from Hot Wheels Battle Force 5
- The Sentients, a faction in the online game Warframe, described as a race of terraforming machines from the Tau system

== Music ==
- Sentient, a 2025 collaboration album by Santana
- Sentience (EP), an EP by electronic music producer 1788-L
- Sentience, an electronic music group headed by Nick Sentience
