= Spiral (Rezz album) =

Studio album by Rezz
- Released: 19 November 2021
- Recorded: 2020–2021
- Genre: Electronic
- Length: 35:35
- Label: RCA
- Producers: Rezz; Peekaboo; Eddie; Fortune of Graves

Rezz chronology
Beyond the Senses (2019)	Spiral (2021)	It's Not a Phase (2023)

Singles from Spiral
- 1. "Sacrificial" Released: 5 February 2021; 2. "Taste of You" Released: 21 May 2021; 3. "Chemical Bond" Released: 3 September 2021; 4. "Let Me In" Released: 1 October 2021

Spiral is the third (Note: The album has been cited by EDM outlets as both Rezz's third and fourth studio album. Press releases from Rezz and Sony Music refer to it as her fourth.) studio album by Canadian electronic music producer Rezz. The album was released through Sony Music's RCA Records on 19 November 2021.

== Background and release ==
In 2020, Rezz announced she was working on a new album. After releasing her first two studio albums (Mass Manipulation and Certain Kind of Magic) through the Canadian record label mau5trap, Rezz would instead release Spiral through RCA Records. Rezz aimed to have the album "heavily branded visually around hypnosis and a spiral themed production".

On 5 February 2021, Rezz released the single "Sacrificial", a collaboration with Pvris that would appear on Spiral. In March 2021, Rezz announced the album's completion. Following the announcement, Rezz released collaborations with deadmau5 and Dove Cameron, titled "Hypnocurrency" and "Taste of You", respectively. Released on 21 May, the latter was one of the album's singles. A music video for "Taste of You" was also released in June.

On 3 September, Rezz released "Chemical Bond", a collaboration with Deathpact. On 1 October, a fourth single titled "Let Me In" was released; the track was a collaboration with fknsyd, who provided vocals. On 3 November, Rezz revealed the album's track list, including its four previously released singles and seven additional tracks. The album was officially released on 19 November.

On 7 January 2022, Rezz released "Menace", a bonus track off Spiral.

== Recording and production ==
The album was originally intended to be released in 2020, though this was postponed due to the COVID-19 pandemic. In an interview with Billboard, Rezz detailed that "A lot of the songs from the album were made, like a year ago [2020]"; however, the pandemic would have affected touring, "so everything was postponed." Though many of the songs were made during 2020, Rezz expressed that songs were added afterwards.

Many of the tracks feature collaborations with other producers and artists, with many featuring artists providing vocals. The song "Paper Walls" is a collaboration with Canadian band Metric, and explores elements of future funk and glitch hop.

== Critical reception ==
The album received generally positive reviews, with many EDM media writers commenting the album displayed Rezz's growth as a producer, whilst maintaining her signature dark sonic presence. Katie Bain of Billboard wrote that Spiral "features the same deliciously ominous, often alien-sounding bass music that made her a breakout star circa 2016." Niko Sani of EDM.com called Spiral Rezz's "most cohesive work yet", adding that "the album captures her signature sound beautifully while simultaneously showcasing her growth and versatility as a music producer."

Opining on "Sacrificial", Katie Stone of EDM.com wrote that Rezz balances Pvris lead singer Lynn Gunn's vocals with "her signature midtempo stylings," and that the track is "both sinister and ethereal in tone, expertly combining elements of rock and electronica into one powerhouse single." Writing about "Chemical Bond", Raven Wright of EDM Identity opined that the track has a "nice and slow" beginning, "with a haunting melody" featuring both Rezz's and Deathpact's signature sounds. Wright added that "the first drop transitions into deep midtempo goodness", and "the second drop that occurs is gritty, nasty, and so captivating".

=== Awards ===
The album was nominated in the "Dance Recording of the Year" category at the Juno Awards of 2023.

== Track listing ==
Spiral – Track listing
No.	Title	Producer(s)	Length
1.	"Chemical Bond" (with Deathpact)	Rezz; Deathpact	2:22
2.	"Let Me In" (with fknsyd)	Rezz	3:28
3.	"Levitate"	Rezz	3:28
4.	"Sacrificial" (with PVRIS)	Rezz	3:02
5.	"Paper Walls" (with Metric)	Rezz	3:39
6.	"Spun"	Rezz	2:46
7.	"Out Of My Head" (with Shadow Cliq)	Rezz	2:55
8.	"Taste of You" (featuring Dove Cameron)	Rezz	2:47
9.	"Vortex" (with Peekaboo)	Rezz; Peekaboo	4:42
10.	"Time" (with Eddie)	Rezz; Eddie	4:00
11.	"Breathe" (with Fortune of Graves)	Rezz; Fortune of Graves	2:21
Total length:			35:35

Bonus track
No.	Title	Producer(s)	Length
12.	"Menace"	Rezz	3:16
Total length:			38:51

== Charts ==
Chart (2021)	Peak position
US Dance/Electronic Albums (Billboard)	6
US Top Heatseekers (Billboard)	13
