= Sentience (EP) =

EP by 1788-L
- Released: August 24, 2018
- Genres: Electronic; midtempo bass
- Length: 15:39
- Label: Deadbeats
- Producers: 1788-L; Totto

1788-L chronology
| Sentience (2018) | Synthetik (2019) |

Singles from Nova
- 1. "Full / Burst" Released: August 3, 2018; 2. "Nu / Ver / Ka" Released: August 17, 2018

Sentience (stylised as S E N T I E N C E) is the debut extended play by electronic music producer 1788-L. It was released by Canadian record label Deadbeats on August 24, 2018. Four songs were released with the album, including two singles, "Full / Burst" with Totto, and "Nu / Ver / Ka".

== Background and release ==
On July 25, 2018, 1788-L launched a website where someone could ask any questions to an AI. If asked certain questions, several details surrounding the extended play would be revealed, including the title, tracklist, that it would be released in August and the first single's release date. The website was launched after it was announced that 1788-L would support Ekali's up "Crystal Eyes" tour.

To promote the release of the extended play, a video summarising the extended play was released by 1788-L via their YouTube channel on August 24, 2018. The video, directed by Jonathan Plesel, featured and was inspired by video games, Gundam and the dystopian/cyberpunk aesthetic.

The two singles "Full / Burst" and "Nu / Ver / Ka" originally debuted by Canadian electronic music duo Zeds Dead during a DJ set in July 2018 and were released as digital downloads on August 3, 2018, and August 17, 2018, respectively. The extended play was released a week after the latter, on August 24, 2018, by record label Deadbeats, owned by Zeds Dead.

== Critical reception ==
Sentience was well received by most critics. Katie Stone of EDM.com wrote that the four tracks included on the extended play were so unique and on the cutting edge that they "stand well on their own and as a bass to your face package." Writing for This Song Slaps, Alejandro Vega wrote that the extended play has "displayed an array of sound design that showcase [1788-L's] skills." Dancing Astronaut's Asher Norris wrote that the extended play showcased 1788-L's signature sound, stating that they have become one of "the most exciting new artists in the red hot mid-tempo bass music scene." Peach Gallagher of Run the Trap described 1788-L's style of production techniques as "undeniable as each track offers a one of a kind sonic experience", writing that the extended play ignited a "firestorm of hard-hitting bass and experimental anthems that will leave any seasoned bass-head breathless."

Selbe Dittman of EDM Sauce reviewed the song "Full / Burst", noting its dark, robot voice and wrote that the combination of both artists' sounds made for an interesting mix. This Song Slaps' Brian Bonavoglia called the song an "aggressive metallic bass beauty that is best defined as mid-tempo at its finest." Writing for Run The Trap, Andre Waguespack compared the song to "Hex", 1788-L's previous collaboration with Canadian DJ and record producer Rezz, calling it a "whirlwind of mid tempo madness."

Writing for Dancing Astronaut, Bella Bagshaw described the song "Nu / Ver / Ka" as the "bleeding embodiment of experimental electronic", writing that the track's "whirlwind arrangement only adds to the dizzying merriment, as the listener is sucked into the oscillating 1788-L continuum." EDM Sauce's Selbe Dittman wrote that the song "showed even more diversity as an artist and DJ", noting that it is more chill but not as "bassy and glitchy" compared to 1788-L's previous tracks. Katie Stone of EDM.com described the song as "definitely have a different sound to them then some of the other 1788-L singles we've heard."

== Track listing ==
Digital download
| No. | Title | Producer(s) | Length |
|---|---|---|---|
| 1. | "Full / Burst" (with Totto) | 1788-L; Totto | 4:00 |
| 2. | "Nu / Ver / Ka" | 1788-L | 3:31 |
| 3. | "Force / Impulse" | 1788-L | 3:38 |
| 4. | "Astray / R" | 1788-L | 4:30 |
| Total length: | | | 15:39 |

== Release history ==
| Region | Date | Format | Label | Ref. |
|---|---|---|---|---|
| Worldwide | August 24, 2018 | Digital download | Deadbeats | |
