= Mord Fustang =

Estonian DJ and music producer

- Born: Rauno Roosnurm; 21 February 1991 (age 35); Kose, Estonia
- Origin: Tallinn, Estonia
- Genres: Electro house; progressive house; dubstep; complextro; hip hop
- Occupations: Musician; DJ; record producer
- Years active: 2010–present
- Labels: Plasmapool; Mau5trap

Rauno Roosnurm (born 21 February 1991), known professionally as Mord Fustang, is an Estonian DJ and music producer. He is regarded as a pioneer in the complextro genre.

== Career ==
Rauno Roosnurm was born in Kose and is based in Tallinn.

In 2011, he released multiple singles on the record label, Plasmapool, such as "The Electric Dream" with Milky Way, "Super Meat Freeze" and "Lick the Rainbow". He gained recognition for remixing singles by artists such as LMFAO. His song "A New World" was featured in a British breakfast commercial. He debuted at the 2011 Ultra Music Festival in Miami.

In March 2012, Mord Fustang was selected as the Breakthrough Artist of the Year at the fifth annual Beatport Music Awards ceremony. He performed at the 2012 Ultra Music Festival. He released a four-song EP titled "Welcome to the Future". He went on the Plasma Pool Tour 2012. His music was featured in the Forza Horizon soundtrack. His music was also an optional music track offered in Counter-Strike: Global Offensive. His song "Windwaker", from the album "All Eyes On Mord Fustang" was featured in the "Electronic" music radio in the game Asphalt 8: Airborne.

In 2015, he released his debut studio album titled 9999 in 1 via his own label Magic Trooper. He described it as a 'concept album'. He was approached by Mau5trap and was subsequently signed to the label. He debuted on Mau5trap with an extended play titled "Murmurs".

In a tweet and Facebook post in May 2021, Mord Fustang stated that he is not affiliated with Plasmapool, citing misrepresentation. He asked fans to not buy or stream from the label due to them being "abusive, manipulative, [lying] to their artists and [using] dirty tricks" to keep artists with them, and stating they had been "dragging classic tracks through the mud for years, using outdated artwork, pushing un-approved releases", and encouraged listeners to pirate his music to get around the label. A track list was posted on in June 2021 detailing the songs he wished were no longer affiliated with Plasmapool.

== Discography ==
=== Albums ===
Title	Details	Peak chart positions
Title	Details	US Dance
The Electric Dream (The Remixes, Pt. 3)	Released: 21 November 2011; Label: Houserecordings; Format: Digital download	—
All Eyes On Mord Fustang	Released: 22 July 2012; Label: Selected; Format: Digital download	—
The Electric Dream (The Remixes)	Released: 9 June 2013; Label: Houserecordings; Format: Digital download	—
All Eyes On Mord Fustang 2	Released: 14 April 2013; Label: Selected; Format: Digital download	—
9999 in 1	Released: 20 January 2015; Label: Magic Trooper; Format: Digital download, CD	17
9999 in 1 (Definitive Edition)	Released: 26 October 2015; Label: Magic Trooper; Format: Digital download	—
Exciteshroom Adventure	Released: 26 May 2018; Label: Dawn of Light; Format: Digital download	—
The Concept of Inspiration	Released: 10 August 2018; Label: Dawn of Light; Format: Digital download	—
All Eyes on Mord Fustang 3	Released: 5 October 2018; Label: Dawn of Light; Format: Digital download	—
III	Released: 9 November 2018; Label: Dawn of Light; Format: Digital download	—
III (Definitive Edition)	23 November 2018; Label: Dawn of Light; Format: Digital Download	—
The Symbolism of Everything	Released: 21 February 2019; Label: Dawn of Light; Format: Digital download	—
The Symbolism of Everything (Coda Edition)	Released: 24 May 2019; Label: Dawn of Light; Format: Digital download	—
Together	Released: 30 August 2019; Label: Dawn of Light; Format: Digital download	—
The Resonance of Energies	Released: 19 June 2020; Label: Dawn of Light; Format: Digital download	—
The Lake	Released: 11 December 2020; Label: Dawn of Light; Format: Digital download	—
Hold On Tight	Released: 26 November 2021; Label: Dawn of Light; Format: Digital download	—
"—" denotes a recording that did not chart or was not released.

=== Extended plays ===
Title	Details
A New World	Released: 1 August 2011; Label: Noize; Format: Digital download
The Electric Dream (The Remixes Pt. 1)	Released: 22 August 2011; Label: Houserecordings; Format: Digital download
The Electric Dream (The Remixes Pt. 2)	Released: 3 December 2011; Label: Houserecordings; Format: Digital download
Welcome to the Future	Released: 16 April 2012; Label: Plasmapool; Format: Digital download
Something Music Related	Released: 30 September 2013; Label: Plasmapool; Format: Digital download
Murmurs	Released: 13 November 2015; Label: mau5trap; Format: Digital download
Fragments: The Kingdom and the Juggler	Released: 25 March 2016; Label: Dawn of Light; Format: Digital download
A New Sun	Released: 11 May 2018; Label: Plasmapool; Format: Digital download
EP2 2018	Released: 11 June 2018; Label: Dawn of Light; Format: Digital download
Contemporary Reality	Released: 19 June 2018; Label: Dawn of Light; Format: Digital download
Parallel Hearts	Released: 3 July 2018; Label: Dawn of Light; Format: Digital download
Ghost in Your Life / Filtered House Thing	Released: 19 October 2018; Label: Dawn of Light; Format: Digital download
III Leftovers	Released: 23 November 2018; Label: Dawn of Light; Format: Digital download
The Process of Elimination	Released: 5 April 2019; Label: Dawn of Light; Format: Digital download
Flower With No Name	Released: 31 May 2019; Label: Dawn of Light; Format: Digital download
Nebula of Hope	Released: 11 October 2019; Label: Dawn of Light; Format: Digital download

=== Singles ===
2011

- "The Electric Dream" [Plasmapool]
- "Super Meat Freeze" [Plasmapool]
- "Milky Way" [Plasmapool]
- "Lick The Rainbow" [Plasmapool]
- "A New World" [NOIZE]
- "Magic Trooper" [Plasmapool]
- "We Are Now Connected" [Plasmapool]

2012

- "Champloo" [Plasmapool]
- "Windwaker" [Plasmapool]

2013

- "Taito" [Plasmapool]
- "Magic Trooper (Jp.Moa Remix)" [Houserecordings]
- "Something Right Meow" [Plasmapool]
- "If You Want" [Plasmapool]

2014

- "Drivel" [Magic Trooper]
- "Pop" [Magic Trooper]
- "Doppelgangbanger" [Magic Trooper]

2015

- "Pop (ST4RBUCK Remix)" [Magic Trooper]

2016

- "We Are" (with Lazy Rich) [Big & Dirty Recordings]
- "Tonight" [Dawn of Light]
- "Eminate (Extended Cut)" [Dawn of Light]
- "Arcade Disc_" [Dawn of Light]

2017

- "Diamonds" [Dawn of Light]
- "Because of You" [Plasmapool]
- "Happy Day At the Zoo" [Plasmapool]

2018

- "VRES" [Plasmapool]
- "Sorbet" [Plasmapool]
- "Cyberflunk" [Plasmapool]
- "Fabricated" [Dawn of Light]
- "Gaia" [Dawn of Light]
- "Elixia" Beat Saber (Original Game Soundtrack), Vol. II – EP]
- "I'm a Voyager" [Dawn of Light]
- "Adieu" [Dawn of Light]
- "Spiked Soda" [Dawn of Light]

2019

- "Frick Datt" [Dawn of Light]
- "Further" [Dawn of Light]
- "The Drifter" [Dawn of Light]
- "Keystones" [Dawn of Light]
- "Mind Out of Sequence" [Dawn of Light]
- "Megalomania" [Dawn of Light]
- "Some Girls" [Dawn of Light]
- "I Drown in You VIP" [Dawn of Light]
- "Strawberry Mountain" [Dawn of Light]
- "Pray" [Dawn of Light]
- "Another Place to Fall" [Dawn of Light]

2020

- "Unassembled" [Dawn of Light]
- "Kindred" [Dawn of Light]
- "Moonstone" [Dawn of Light]
- "Another Earth" [Dawn of Light]
- "C'EST LE BON" [Dawn of Light]
- "Fantôme" [Dawn of Light]
- "Joanna" [Dawn of Light]
- "Cyphers" [Dawn of Light]
- "Carousel" [Dawn of Light]

=== Remixes ===
2011

- Fussy Boy — "Gold" (Mord Fustang Remix) [Plasmapool]
- Morgan Page, Sultan & Ned Shepard and BT featuring Angela McCluskey — "In The Air" (Mord Fustang Remix) [Nettwerk]
- LMFAO — "Sexy And I Know It" (Mord Fustang Remix) [Foo & Blu]
- Froidz — "Finally" (Mord Fustang Remix) [Yawa Recordings]

2015

- The Glitch Mob — "Carry The Sun" (Mord Fustang Remix) [Glass Air]

2019

- Mord Fustang — "I Drown in You VIP" [Dawn of Light]

2020

- Midnight Kids — "Last Time" (Mord Fustang Remix) [RCA Records]

== See also ==
- Ford Mustang
- Deadmau5
