= Underplayed =

2020 Canadian documentary film

- Film poster
- Directed by: Stacey Lee
- Written by: Neil Blewett; Georgia Dodson; Stacey Lee
- Produced by: William Crouse
- Starring: Rezz; Nervo; Tokimonsta; Alison Wonderland
- Cinematography: Zoe Simone Yi
- Edited by: Georgia Dodson
- Music by: Kate Simko
- Production company: Popp Rok
- Release date: April 15, 2020 (Tribeca)
- Running time: 87 minutes
- Country: Canada
- Language: English

Underplayed is a 2020 Canadian documentary film, directed by Stacey Lee. The film profiles various women in electronic music, centring in large part on their struggles to be taken as seriously as male counterparts during the 2019 music festival season due to continued gender inequality in the music business.

Artists profiled in the film include Rezz, Nervo, Nightwave, Sherelle, Tygapaw, Tokimonsta and Alison Wonderland. It also contextualizes the broader history of women in electronic music, including information about pioneers such as Delia Derbyshire, Suzanne Ciani and Daphne Oram.

== Release ==
The film premiered on April 15, 2020, at the Tribeca Film Festival, and had its Canadian premiere at the 2020 Toronto International Film Festival on September 19. Its Toronto screening, at Ontario Place's OLG Play stage, was followed by a DJ set by Rezz.

The film was added to Crave's streaming service in March 2021.

== Reception ==
On the review aggregator website Rotten Tomatoes, 100% of 14 critics' reviews are positive, with an average rating of 7.4/10.

Alisha Mughal of Exclaim! wrote, "Filmed through a deeply intersectional feminist lens, Underplayed highlights not just the genre's shortcomings when it comes to representation, but also how the industry can do better. A remarkable feat of equitable representation, Underplayed, in its 88-minute runtime, manages to show us the beautiful, diverse and talented multitude of people making electronic music — their history, and their hopeful future."
