= Holly (DJ) =

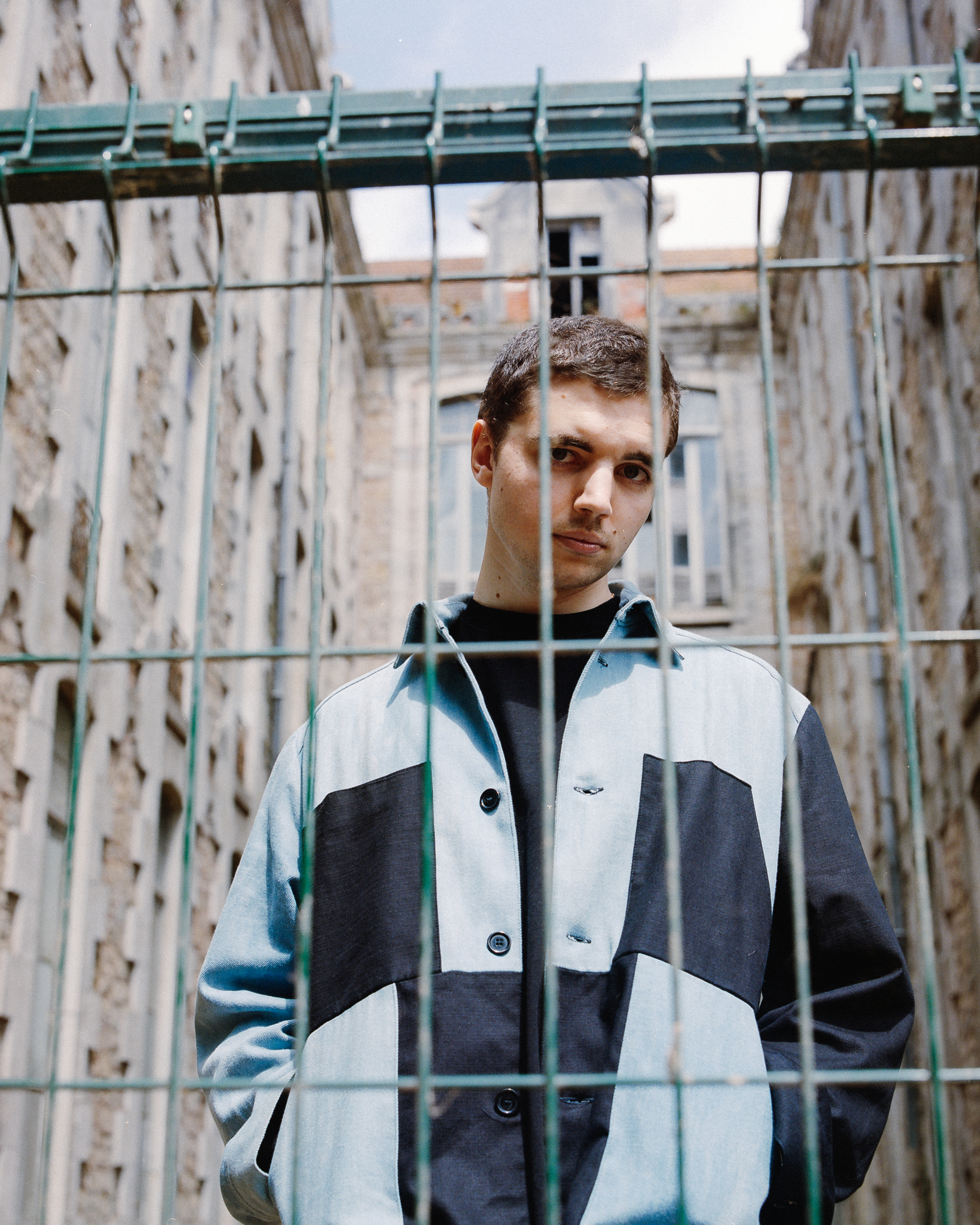
- Holly in 2020

Background information
- Born: Miguel Oliveira; 1995 (age 30–31); Portugal
- Genres: EDM; hip hop
- Occupations: DJ; record producer
- Years active: 2013–present
- Labels: Monstercat; Fool's Gold; HARD Recs; Sable Valley; 88rising; Dome of Doom; Alpha Pup
- Website: beatsbyholly.com

Miguel Oliveira (born 1995), professionally known as Holly, is a Portuguese DJ and music producer.

Holly started making music at the age of 18. He has produced songs for CL, Gunplay, A$AP TyY, OG Maco, UnoTheActivist, Jay Park, Lee Hi, Slow J, amongst others, and has toured in USA, Australia, Europe, Asia and South Africa- performing at festivals including Coachella, EDC Las Vegas, EDC Korea and Shambhala. Holly also won the first A-Trak Goldie Awards in 2017, in the category of Beat Battle.

In 2020, Holly helped co-produce Baauer's album Planet's Mad, which received a nomination for Best Dance/Electronic Album in the 2021 Grammy Awards.

== Career ==
=== 2013-2019 ===
During this period, Holly released his music on a number of independent music labels, including Buygore, Fool's Gold Records, Dim Mak Records, and Monstercat.

In 2019 Holly performed around the world at festivals including Coachella, EDC Las Vegas, and EDC Korea, and released the EP "Alameda 1000" that features collaborations with Bloody Beetroots, A$AP TyY and Gunplay. He also produced part of the "Blue Man Group" Speechless soundtrack and worked on ProfJam's album #FFFFFF, which went platinum in Portugal. Holly also produced for the rappers Joey Purp, Kami, Slow J, LE of EXID and Kappa Jotta. In 2019 he was highlighted by Billboard Dance as an emerging artist, describing his sound as ‘tough, but sophisticated and often experimental bass that often properly pummels.’ Holly also released official remixes for TOKiMONSTA, ZHU and Alison Wonderland in 2019.

=== 2020 ===
In 2020 Holly released the collaborative project "Berry Patch" with Machinedrum, collaborated with Zeds Dead, Slushii, UZ and co-produced the Grammy Nominated album "Planet's Mad" with Baauer. He also did production on Machinedrum LP "A View Of U" released on Ninja Tune. Holly additionally produced a number of hip-hop projects for artists such as CL, Dok2, Lee Hi, Jay Park, Ramengvrl, AK AusserKontrolle, Wet Bed Gang and Kembe X.

=== Dark Skies & Holy Grail Mixtape ===
In 2020 Holly released the bass-heavy mixtape Dark Skies & Holy Grail, a collection of 11 tracks made between the United States and Holly's hometown in Portugal. Holly described Dark Skies as a metaphor for how he saw the world at the time of making the project- with 'Dark Skies' representing the difficulties that we face in order to conquer our dreams, and dreams being represented by 'Holy Grail'.

The mixtape includes collaborations with Baauer, UnoTheActivist, OG Maco, Ugly Duck, Sebastian Reynoso, RahRah, TOKiMONSTA and TEARZ. The project also features a collaboration with Mac P Dawg and SUFFER GRiM, on the track "Fridays Night". Holly and Mac P Dawg met in Los Angeles where they wrote the song together, and two weeks after the session Mac P Dawg passed away killed due to gun violence. Holly and Mac P Dawg's family mutually decided to go ahead with releasing the track with all proceeds donated to Mac's family.

As part of the project Holly collaborated with the fashion designer and stylist Alexandra Moura, and also did mixes for BBC Diplo & Friends and Complex.

== Discography ==
=== Albums ===
List of studio albums
Title	Album details
IIII (with Machinedrum, Thys, & Salvador Breed)	Released: October 9, 2025; Label: Vision Recordings; Formats: Vinyl, digital download, streaming

=== Mixtapes ===
List of mixtapes
Title	Mixtape details
Boundaries (with Woolymammoth)	Released: April 27, 2018; Label: Dome of Doom; Formats: Cassette, digital download, streaming
Dark Skies & Holy Grail	Released: October 23, 2020; Label: HARD Recs; Formats: Digital download, streaming
The Core Tape, Vol. 1 (with Dok2)	Released: February 17, 2023; Label: 808 Hi, Lehua; Formats: Digital download, streaming
The Core Tape, Vol. 2 (with Dok2)	Released: March 28, 2023; Label: 808 Hi, Lehua; Formats: Digital download, streaming
The Core Tape, Vol. 3 (with Dok2)	Released: September 23, 2023; Label: 808 Hi, Lehua; Formats: Digital download, streaming

=== EPs ===
List of extended plays
Title	EP details
Premiere	Released: August 26, 2014; Label: Rockit; Formats: Digital download, streaming
October Stash	Released: October 2, 2014; Label: Rockit; Formats: Digital download, streaming
Libertry (with Razat)	Released: November 17, 2014; Label: Razat Laboratory, Rockit; Formats: Digital download, streaming
Atlanticism (with Zebulon)	Released: December 3, 2014; Label: Self-released; Formats: Digital download, streaming
Clouds	Released: February 23, 2015; Label: Rockit; Formats: Digital download, streaming
World In A Room	Released: May 11, 2015; Label: Self-released; Formats: Digital download, streaming
Clouds Remixes	Released: May 25, 2015; Label: Self-released; Formats: Digital download, streaming
Manere Aurum	Released: September 13, 2015; Label: Self-released; Formats: Digital download, streaming
Libertry Vol.2 (with Razat)	Released: November 9, 2015; Label: Self-released; Formats: Digital download, streaming
Hokkaido (with João Tamura)	Released: April 18, 2016; Label: Self-released; Formats: CD, digital download, streaming
Heavyweight (with Levit∆te)	Released: June 24, 2016; Label: All Trap Music; Formats: Digital download, streaming
Forward	Released: July 1, 2016; Label: Buygore; Formats: Digital download, streaming
Palpitations (with Twofold)	Released: December 23, 2016; Label: MalLabel; Formats: Digital download, streaming
Connection Lost (with Phonat)	Released: January 18, 2017; Label: Trekkie Trax; Formats: Digital download, streaming
Bushwick	Released: March 17, 2017; Label: Saturate!Records; Formats: Digital download, streaming
Yakamoz	Released: April 14, 2017; Label: Buygore; Formats: Digital download, streaming
78SM95 (with VVV)	Released: June 2, 2017; Label: Hush Hush; Formats: Cassette, digital download, streaming
Libertry Pt. 3 (with Razat)	Released: June 23, 2017; Label: Dome of Doom; Formats: Digital download, streaming
Beijing	Released: October 20, 2017; Label: Buygore; Formats: Digital download, streaming
Maggie Love	Released: November 21, 2017; Label: Saturate!Records; Formats: Digital download, streaming
To The Floor (with Rude Jude)	Released: November 24, 2017; Label: Kronik Music; Formats: Digital download, streaming
Jaran (with DJ Kentaro)	Released: November 29, 2017; Label: Trekkie Trax; Formats: Digital download, streaming
15 Hours To LA	Released: January 26, 2018; Label: Alpha Pup; Formats: Vinyl, digital download, streaming
Hollylandz (with Landim)	Released: March 3, 2018; Label: Big Bit Música; Formats: Digital download, streaming
Reyna	Released: July 20, 2018; Label: Buygore; Formats: Digital download, streaming
Avenal 2500	Released: May 17, 2019; Label: Deadbeats; Formats: Digital download, streaming
Alameda 1000	Released: September 13, 2019; Label: Insomniac; Formats: Digital download, streaming
Alameda 1000 (The Remixes)	Released: December 20, 2019; Label: Insomniac; Formats: Digital download, streaming
Berry Patch (with Machinedrum)	Released: January 31, 2020; Label: Vision Recordings; Formats: Vinyl, digital download, streaming
Berry Patch: Blended (with Machinedrum)	Released: May 1, 2020; Label: Vision Recordings; Formats: Digital download, streaming
Minha Vida - Love	Released: September 16, 2022; Label: Ilex; Formats: Digital download, streaming
Minha Vida - Sadness	Released: June 2, 2023; Label: Ilex; Formats: Digital download, streaming
天の川 (River Of Heaven) with Machinedrum)	Released: August 31, 2023; Label: Vision Recordings; Formats: Vinyl, digital download, streaming
Axis	Released: December 22, 2023; Label: Monta; Formats: Digital download, streaming
Angel In The Rave	Released: June 28, 2024; Label: HypnoVizion; Formats: Digital download, streaming
Minha Vida - Hope	Released: December 6, 2024; Label: Ilex; Formats: Digital download, streaming

=== Singles ===
Title	Year	Album	Label
"How I Do" (with Quix, Montell2099, Elevate, & Villette)	2015	Non-album singles	Self-released
"Meanings" (with Verzache)	2016	Non-album singles	Self-released
"Haha Idk" (with Underscores)	2016	Non-album singles	La Clinica Recs
"Allday" (with Droeloe)	2016	Non-album singles	Heroic
"Big Time Player" (with IYFFE)	2016	Circus Three	Circus Records
"Every Night" (with Jayceeoh & Brewski)	2016	All I Want For Christmas Is Bass	Kannibalen
"Never Lost" (with Snareskin)	2017	Non-album single	Lowly
"Milky" (with Nitti Gritti)	2017	Non-album single	Pantheon Select, Indie Select
"Sacrifice" (with Umru)	2017	Non-album single	Rauthentic
"Turmoil" (with Slippy)	2017	Monstercat Uncaged Vol. 1	Monstercat
"Divine" (with Shanghai Doom)	2017	Free Spirits, Vol. 5	Spirited
"Cult" (with Karluv Klub)	2017	All I Want For Christmas Is Bass Vol. 2	Kannibalen
"Fire Flower" (with Loosid)	2018	Monstercat Uncaged Vol. 6	Monstercat
"Encontrar" (feat. Slow J)	2019	Avenal 2500	Deadbeats
"Till I Die" (with A$AP TyY & NXSTY)	2019	Alameda 1000	Insomniac Records
"Through Me"	2019	Alameda 1000	Insomniac Records
"On Me" (with Gunplay & Okay! Kenji)	2019	Alameda 1000	Insomniac Records
"Dawgs" (with The Bloody Beetroots)	2019	Alameda 1000	Insomniac Records
"All Night Long" (with Slushii)	2020	Non-album single	Self-released
"Evil Eye"	2020	Non-album single	Music High Court
"Paradigm" (with Kotek)	2020	Sonoglyph Pt. 2	Westwood Recordings
"Just Enough" (feat. Baauer) / "Amusement" (feat. UnoTheActivist)	2020	Dark Skies & Holy Grail	HARD Recs
"Angel Fire" (feat. Sebastian Reynoso) / "Fridays Night" (feat. Mac P Dawg & Suffer Grim)	2020	Dark Skies & Holy Grail	HARD Recs
"Safety" (feat. RahRah)	2020	Dark Skies & Holy Grail	HARD Recs
"Purge" (with LICK)	2021	Beyond The Void	ALT:Vision
"Looking For My Peace"	2022	Minha Vida - Love	Ilex
"Close 2 Protect"	2022	Minha Vida - Love	Ilex
"Close 2 Protect" (Lunice Remix)	2022	Non-album single	Ilex
"Darkness Edge"	2022	Mission 02	Vision Recordings
"Conflict"	2023	Non-album singles	Jadu Dala
"Hide Sun" (with Machinedrum)	2023	天の川 (River Of Heaven)	Vision Recordings
"Play With You" (with 24hrs)	2023	Non-album singles	Dim Mak
"Novaform" / "Blueshift" (with Machinedrum)	2023	天の川 (River Of Heaven)	Vision Recordings
"Seoul" (with FrostTop)	2023	Non-album singles	Sable Valley
"SOS"	2023	Non-album singles	Sable Valley
"INSD" (with Msft & Blush)	2023	Axis	Monta
"Monzo" (with Flosstradamus & X&G)	2023	Axis	Monta
"Dysphoria" (with Rezz)	2024	Can You See Me?	HypnoVizion
"Scream" (with Wiwek)	2024	Jungle Terror, Vol. 5	Barong Family
"Pain Away"	2024	Non-album single	HARD Recs
"Frankfurt" (with Machinedrum, Thys, & Salvador Breed)	2025	IIII	Vision Recordings
"Control" (with Machinedrum, Thys, & Salvador Breed)	2025	IIII	Vision Recordings
"Where Were U" (with Machinedrum, Thys, & Salvador Breed)	2025	IIII	Vision Recordings
"Solitu" (with Machinedrum, Thys, & Salvador Breed)	2025	IIII	Vision Recordings

=== Features and other appearances ===
Title	Year	Album	Label
"Love Live" (with DJ Ride)	2015	From Scratch	Self-released
"Bring It Back" (with Enschway)	2016	Friendschway	Skalrud
"Rackhead" (with MYRNE)	2016	Fundamentals	Buygore
"Riot" (with Gangsigns)	2016	STYLSS Loves You: Volume 3 (Collab Edition)	STYLSS
"I Don't Mind" (with SHACKLΣS)	2016	Good Enuff 001 - Uni	Good Enuff
"Tryptamine" (with Big Makk)	2016	The Makk Tape	Self-released
"Mixed Feelings" (with Woolymammoth)	2016	Division VA EP 003	Division Recordings
"Beggar" (with Yung Skrrt)	2016	A Feeling	Skrrt Records
"Manada" (with Ruxell)	2016	Good Enuff 002 - Konpachi	Good Enuff
"Isolation" (with Sumthin Sumthin)	2016	Good Enuff 002 - Konpachi	Good Enuff
"Helping Mom N Dad" (with Boltex)	2016	Gravity Well	Renraku
"Negative Degrees" (with Little Snake)	2017	issue nine | Anxiety	Phuture Collective
"bang lush" (with Yunis)	2017	issue nine | Anxiety	Phuture Collective
"Visor" (with Former)	2017	Partial#2	Division Recordings
"Chronoception" (with Chime & LoneMoon)	2017	Invincible	Firepower Records
"ilusao" (with EGL)	2017	Infinity Mirrors - A Compilation Curated by ZEE	Gravitas Recordings
"Cerbatops" (with Autodrive)	2018	Savage Selects, Vol. 2	Savage Society
"Barely" (with Bellorum)	2018	My World	Barong Family
"Burn" (with Madeaux, josh pan & FiFi Rong)	2018	Burn	Fool's Gold Records, Reservoir Recordings
"MISSU"	2018	We Are Deadbeats (Vol. 3)	Deadbeats
"Declaration" (with Yung Skrrt)	2018	Triple Other	Skrrt Digital
"O Hino" (with ProfJam)	2019	#FFFFFF	Sony Music Entertainment Portugal
"Mama's Cumpleańos" (with $K & Ashley Taylor)	2019	Young Art Sound II	Young Art
"Asteroid" (with Zeds Dead)	2020	We Are Deadbeats (Vol. 4)	Deadbeats
"Labyrinth"	2020	Sable Valley Summer, Vol. 1	Sable Valley
"Sage" (with Demie Cao)	2020	Thicker Lines	5A Label, Steel Wool, EMPIRE
"Rockstar" (with UZ & RIKKDARULAH)	2020	Trinity	Quality Goods
"Excalibur" (with Slumberjack)	2022	Dichotomy	Sweat It Out, Warner
"ID Summer Jam" (with Baauer)	2022	Sable Valley Summer Vol. 3	Sable Valley
"nowhere" (with Daktyl)	2023	Halcyon (Tape 2)	Self-released
"I Don't See Grey" (with AKTHESAVIOR)	2024	Blessings In The Grey III	Self-released
"shyne 4 me" (with Knock2, Warren Hue, & PIAO)	2025	nolimit	88rising

=== Remixes ===
Year	Song	Artist	Album	Label
2016	"Control"	X&G	Anomalies Remixes	Self-released
2017	"Twisted Up"	Yunis	Distorted Sines	Saturate!Records
2017	"Alchemy"	ATLiens	Alchemy Remixes	Self-released
2018	"Falangaa"	Jimmy Pé	WuShu	Saturate!Records
2018	"Bibimbap"	Tokimonsta	Lune Rouge (Remixed)	Young Art
2018	"Sub Zero"	Aiden Jude & Max Landry	Sub Zero Remixes	Lowly
2018	"Blurry Eyes"	Hotel Garuda & RUNN	Blurry Eyes (Remixes)	Mom+Pop
2018	"Crime Lords"	Sunny Levine & Shabazz Palaces	NTNS RMX DPT	Alpha Pup Records
2018	"Kill Em"	Zeds Dead & 1000volts (Redman & Jayceeoh)	Kill Em (Remixes)	Deadbeats
2019	"Light It Up"	ZHU & Tokimonsta	Insomniac Records Presents: EDC Las Vegas 2019	Insomniac Records
2019	"Peace"	Alison Wonderland	Peace: Remixes	EMI, Universal
2020	"Sound Of The Underground"	Zeds Dead & Urbandawn	We Are Deadbeats (Vol. 4 Deluxe)	Deadbeats
2020	"Fried For The Night"	Tokimonsta	Oasis Nocturno (Remixed)	Young Art
2020	"Home"	Baauer	Planet's Mad (Globe's Crazy)	LuckyMe
2022	"Choosing For You"	I Am Legion (Noisia & Foreign Beggars)	The Resonance II	Vision Recordings
2023	"Karma"	Rossy & Jazz Cartier	Heavens Door (Remixes)	Self-released

=== Production credits ===
Year	Title	Artist(s)	Album
2015	"Insónias"	Bispo	Non-album single
2015	"ILWY"	Dengaz	Para Sempre
2015	"Amén"	Bispo	Desde a Origem
2016	"Lembra-Te"	Bispo	Desde a Origem
2016	"Nada Errado" (feat. António Zambujo)	Dengaz	Para Sempre
2017	"Fome"	Slow J	Non-album single
2017	"Homie"	Kappa Jotta	Ligação
2018	"Imbecis/Íman" (feat. Slow J, co-prod. Slow J)	Papillon	Deepak Looper
2018	"Metamorfose Fase II" (co-prod. FreshBeats)	Papillon	Deepak Looper
2018	"Imagina"	Papillon	Deepak Looper
2018	"Turn Me Down"	S-X	Reasons
2018	"Teu Eternamente"	Slow J	You Are Forgiven
2019	"Lingo"	Seqo Billy	Non-album singles
2019	"Aceso"	Papillon	Non-album singles
2019	"Go Commando"	Ramengvrl	No Bethany
2019	"I Make Time" (feat. Matter Mos)	Ramengvrl	No Bethany
2019	"Djah Djah"	Kappa Jotta	Non-album single
2019	"Bad Minah" (feat. Hullera)	Ramengvrl	No Bethany
2019	"Sayless"	KAMI & Joey Purp	Non-album single
2019	"Fam" (feat. Papillon)	Slow J	You Are Forgiven
2019	"Changed"	CloudNone & Laura Brehm	Monstercat Instinct Vol. 5
2019	"Sweet Spot" (feat. Murta)	Papillon	Non-album single
2020	"Premiere"	Loosid	Epicenter
2020	"Parto Sem Dor"	Capicua	Madrepérola
2020	"Ela"	Cíntia	Ela
2020	"Sweep It Up"	ITOWNKID	Yama. Trapper Of The Century
2020	"Revolution"	ITOWNKID	Yama. Trapper Of The Century
2020	"Cold"	ITOWNKID	Yama. Trapper Of The Century
2020	"Burn"	ITOWNKID	Yama. Trapper Of The Century
2020	"또"	ITOWNKID	Yama. Trapper Of The Century
2020	"Let Us Talk"	Samuel Seo	Non-album singles
2020	"Sobre Mim"	Bispo	Non-album singles
2020	"Bem Vindo A Casa"	Slow J	Non-album singles
2020	"Go With Me (Love 4eva)"	Calez	Non-album singles
2020	"Farda"	GSON & i.M	Non-album singles
2020	"Inveja"	Wet Bed Gang	Non-album singles
2020	"Chillin'"	Papillon	Non-album singles
2020	"Favelada" (feat. Paulelson)	Carla Prata	Non-album singles
2020	"Ego" (feat. Khundi Panda)	Grizzly	Fake Red
2020	"Senpai"	Yungnoodle	Non-album single
2020	"Savana" (feat. Londone)	Cintia	Gyals And Gyals
2020	"+Post Up+" (co-prod. Baauer)	CL	Non-album single
2020	"QE"	Lhast	Amor'Fati
2020	"Whale"	Osshun Gum	Plan A
2020	"Trip"	Boo Hyun Seok	Front Line
2020	"Night Flight"	Boo Hyun Seok	Front Line
2020	"Planet's Mad"	Baauer	Planet's Mad
2020	"Aether"	Baauer	Planet's Mad
2020	"REACHUPDONTSTOP"	Baauer	Planet's Mad
2020	"Planck"	Baauer	Planet's Mad
2020	"Magic"	Baauer	Planet's Mad
2020	"Remina"	Baauer	Planet's Mad
2020	"Mahal Vision"	Loosid	Mirage
2020	"Embassy Monday"	Loosid	Mirage
2020	"Meco"	Loosid	Mirage
2020	"Earth at Night"	Loosid	Mirage
2020	"Messier 81"	Loosid	Mirage
2020	"Believe in U"	Machinedrum	A View of U
2020	"Spin Blocks" (feat. Father)	Machinedrum	A View of U
2020	"The Relic" (feat. Rochelle Jordan)	Machinedrum	A View of U
2020	"1000 miles" (feat. Sub Focus)	Machinedrum	A View of U
2020	"Sleepy Pietro" (feat. Tigran Hamasyan)	Machinedrum	A View of U
2020	"Automatic" (feat. Babylon, twlv, Moon Sujin, BIBI, & Jiselle)	Chancellor	Non-album singles
2020	"Automatic Remix" (feat. Jay Park, LeeHi, BIBI, JAMIE, Moon Sujin, BUMKEY, Samuel Seo, SURAN, Babylon, Hoody, SUMIN, MRSHLL, ELO, twlv, oceanfromtheblue, Jiselle, SOLE, THAMA, Toshi, JINBO the SuperFreak, jerd, SOOVI, B.E.D., Xydo, Owell Mood, & NONE)	Chancellor	Non-album singles
2021	"Welfare"	Danny Brown	TV62
2021	"Fatal Attraction" (feat. Reese LaFlare)	Boombox Cartel	Cartel II
2021	"Icing" (co-prod. Vegyn)	John Glacier	Shiloh: Lost For Words
2021	"Spicy" (co-prod. Baauer & Fabian Mazur)	CL	Alpha
2021	"Spicy (Remix)" (feat. Omega Sapien, sokodomo, & Lil Cherry)	CL	Non-album single
2022	"Froyo" (feat. Warren Hue, co-prod. Chasu)	88rising, BIBI, & Rich Brian	Head In The Clouds Forever
2023	"Runner" (co-prod. ISOxo)	RL Grime	Play
2023	"Lose My Mind" (feat. Reo Cragun)	RL Grime	Play
2023	"Slow Dive" (feat. Bea Miller, co-prod. Andrew Wells & Frequency, co-written by Lowell, Bülow, & Trey Campbell)	RL Grime	Play
2023	"Push"	RL Grime	Play
2023	"Quaranta"	Danny Brown	Quaranta
2025	"Starburst" (co-written by Angel Prost)	Danny Brown	Stardust
2025	"Flowers" (feat. 8485)	Danny Brown	Stardust
2025	"Lift You Up" (co-written by Angel Prost)	Danny Brown	Stardust
2025	"Whatever The Case" (feat. ISSBROKIE)	Danny Brown	Stardust
