= Can You See Me? (album) =

Studio album by Rezz
- Released: 14 March 2024
- Recorded: 2023–2024
- Studio: Tiny Stu (Toronto)
- Genre: Electronic
- Length: 31:01
- Label: HypnoVizion
- Producers: Rezz; Blanke; Cyclops; deadmau5; Digital Ethos; Eddie; Holly; Inzo; Kavari; Subtronics

Rezz chronology
| It's Not a Phase (2023) | Can You See Me? (2024) | As the Pendulum Swings (2025) |

Singles from Can You See Me?
- 1. "Infraliminal - Isabelle's Version" Released: 13 October 2023; 2. "Black Ice" Released: 9 January 2024; 3. "Dysphoria" Released: 19 January 2024; 4. "Can You See Me?" Released: 16 February 2024; 5. "Everywhere, Nowhere" Released: 1 March 2024

Can You See Me? (stylized in all caps) is the fourth studio album by Canadian electronic music producer Rezz, released through her HypnoVizion Records imprint on 14 March 2024.

The album saw Rezz pivot from her usual midtempo style, as she focused on a heavy bass sound. A particularly collaborative effort, the album's release was preceded by five singles.

== Background ==
The album is a follow-up to Rezz's 2023 EP It's Not a Phase, though it is her first full-length studio album since Spiral (2021). In June 2023, Rezz and deadmau5 announced they were working on a reworked version of the latter's 2012 track "Superliminal". The two released "Infraliminal" on 13 October, under the name Rezzmau5. An alternate version, "Infraliminal - Isabelle's Version" was also released. Though not originally intended to be included on Can You See Me?, the latter track was ultimately a "last minute addition" to the album, with Rezz citing the original "Superliminal" as the reason she began working on music.

On 9 January 2024, Rezz released "Black Ice", a collaborative track produced alongside Subtronics. The track would later be placed on the album.

== Recording and production ==
Speaking about the album, Rezz stated that the project would feature her "heaviest tracks", as she entered a "new bass music era" of her career. Rezz also enlisted the help of several fellow EDM producers for Can You See Me?, with the album being her most collaborative to date.

External videos
- Track breakdown of "Can You See Me?"
- Rezz' New Studio + Track Breakdown of "Can You See Me?"

She recorded the album in her personal Toronto studio, an all-black painted shed in her backyard. Nicknamed "the tiny Stu" [sic], the private workspace has red lighting and was adorned with horror movie decorations. Following the release of "Can You See Me?", Rezz released a YouTube video where she breaks down her production of the track.

== Music and composition ==
Comparing the album to her previous Spiral, Grammy.com's Harry Levin wrote "Where Spiral was more radio-friendly and featured vocals from pop star Dove Cameron, Can You See Me? is decidedly experimental". Levin added that "Rezz buries melodies underneath gruesome sound design". Moving away from the midtempo pace that she became known for, none of the project's tracks are within the 90–100 BPM range. Rezz instead delved deep into a bass sound while working on the project, intending for the album to have a heavy, dark, industrial, and rhythmic sound. Its title track indeed features deep basslines. A collaboration with Inzo, "The Descent" is a dubstep track featuring "wobbling basses". "Dysphoria" and "Cut Me Out" both feature slow tempos and deep bass; the latter is the slower and deeper of the two and also includes a house music break as the track ends.

Though her use of bass on the album is often mentioned by EDM media outlets, music writers have also noted that various tracks include synths and elements of sonic distortion. "Black Ice" and "Exorcism" both feature such distortion. The latter features "mangled growls and void-like synths", with Rezz describing it as a "terror, horror track".

Vocals are also notably less present on the album than on her previous works. Rezz stated that her favorite music she has made was instrumental. While vocals were featured less on Can You See Me?, there are some throughout the album, including Rezz's own whispers on the title track.

== Promotion and release ==
Rezz announced Can You See Me? shortly after "Black Ice"'s release. On 19 January 2024, Rezz released the single "Dysphoria", a collaboration with Portuguese DJ Holly. Later, on 16 February, Rezz released the album's titular single. On 1 March, Rezz released the album's final single: "Everywhere, Nowhere", a collaboration with Blanke. The two previously collaborated on the 2018 song "Mixed Singles".

As part of the album's rollout, Rezz announced the release of a sex toy dubbed the "Erotic HypnoDildo". Having originated as a joke amongst fans of Rezz on Twitter, the toy was released ahead of the album's title track; reportedly, it sold out in under 30 minutes. Can You See Me? was officially released on 14 March.

As opposed to full-length tour she had done with Spiral, Rezz announced she would be going on a spaced-out tour across selected cities for the album. In addition to her annual "Rezz Rocks" tour in Colorado, she also performed in Phoenix, Miami, and New York.

== Critical reception ==
Writing for EDM Identity, Jackie Peppler wrote that the album's opening title track "sets the tone effortlessly, with an ominous, sinister aura and Rezz's eery whispers over psychoactive elements".

Cameron Sunkel of EDM.com wrote that the album "[cemented] Rezz's position as a master architect of supernatural sounds". Also writing for EDM.com, Niko Sani opined that "Everywhere, Nowhere" was a "bone-chilling track with powerful, potent bass and dynamic percussion leading the charge".

== Track listing ==
Can You See Me? track listing
| No. | Title | Writer(s) | Producer(s) | Length |
|---|---|---|---|---|
| 1. | "Can You See Me?" | Isabelle Rezazadeh | Rezz | 2:21 |
| 2. | "Everywhere, Nowhere" (with Blanke) | Rezazadeh; JP Orchison | Rezz; Blanke | 3:05 |
| 3. | "Black Ice" (with Subtronics) | Rezazadeh; Jesse Kardon | Rezz; Subtronics | 4:20 |
| 4. | "Cut Me Out" (with Digital Ethos) | Rezazadeh; Charlie Quigley | Rezz; Digital Ethos | 3:42 |
| 5. | "The Descent" (with Inzo) | Rezazadeh; Mike Inzano | Rezz; Inzo | 3:07 |
| 6. | "Open Ur Eye" (with Cyclops) | Rezazadeh; Keith Palmieri | Rezz; Cyclops | 2:48 |
| 7. | "Dysphoria" (with Holly) | Rezazadeh; Miguel Oliveira | Rezz; Holly | 2:37 |
| 8. | "Maleficent" (with Eddie) | Rezazadeh; Edwin Beganovic | Rezz; Eddie | 2:50 |
| 9. | "Exorcism" (with Kavari) | Rezazadeh; Cameron Winters | Rezz; Kavari | 2:12 |
| 10. | "Infraliminal - Isabelle's Version" (as Rezzmau5) | Rezazadeh; Joel Zimmerman | Rezz; deadmau5 | 3:56 |

Notes

- "Can You See Me?", "Cut Me Out", "Open Ur Eye", and "Dysphoria" are stylized in all caps.
