= Witching Hour (song) =

Single by Rezz

from the album Certain Kind of Magic
- Released: 4 June 2018
- Genre: Midtempo bass
- Length: 3:12
- Label: Mau5trap
- Songwriter(s): Isabelle Rezazadeh
- Producer(s): Isabelle Rezazadeh

Rezz singles chronology
"Drugs!" (2017)	"Witching Hour" (2018)	"Hex" (2018)

"Witching Hour" is a song by Canadian electronic music producer Rezz, released by Canadian record label Mau5trap on 4 June 2018 as the lead single from her second studio album Certain Kind of Magic.

== Background and release ==
On 1 June 2018, Rezazadeh announced that her second studio album was titled Certain Kind of Magic and was to be released on 3 August and two singles were planned to be released in June. She announced that the first single was to be released on 8 June, though she later notified that the single was to be released four days earlier. It was released as a digital download as the album's first single on 4 June 2018.

The song was released as part of Rezazadeh's second studio album titled Certain Kind of Magic released on 3 August 2018. It was the first track on the album, which also includes seven other songs.

== Critical reception ==
"Witching Hour" was well received by most critics. Your EDM's Matthew Meadow wrote that the song was a "stellar introduction to the new Rezz sound on the album", describing it as a mix between her usual style with an "invigorated drive and purpose". Amanda Kennedy of Dance Music Northwest stated that the song has "the indescribable Rezz feel", noting the songs ricocheting percussion and dark synth lines. Writing for Relentless Beats, Grace Fell wrote that the song stayed true to Rezazadeh's style, noting it as "deep space bass, alien-like sounds, and a hypnotic essence" and describing the song as mystical and haunting, yet comforting at the same time. Michael Cooper of Dancing Astronaut stated that the song acts as proof that that "[Rezz] isn’t slowing down one bit", noting the song for its "spidery, skittering percussion and reverb-heavy synth lines to set a fitting ominous mood." EDMTunes' Matt Sierra noted the song's drop as comparable to her other tracks, writing that it isn't "something easily describable." Writing for EDM Chicago, Marisa Mackowiak described the song as a "satisfying, perfect blend of Rezz-sounding, spooky, textured hypnotic bass and ominous synths." Erik Mahal of EDM Sauce praised the song, writing that Rezazadeh had "once again taken some of the best qualities of the best and but her own signature spin on it." Billboard's William Selviz wrote that the song follows Rezazadeh's "hypnotic and trippy" style, adding that the song features "haunting sonic elements prime for Halloween hours." Writing for Noiseporn, Jeanette Kats praised Rezazadeh's song production and style, noting the songs "signature ominous melody leads into heavy-hitting drums and an upgraded dose of sound design."

== Track listing ==
Digital download
No.	Title	Length
1.	"Witching Hour"	3:12
Total length:		3:12

== Release history ==
Region	Date	Format	Version	Label	Ref.
Worldwide	11 June 2018	Digital download	"Witching Hour" - Single	Mau5trap	
Worldwide	3 August 2018	Digital download	Certain Kind of Magic	Mau5trap	
