= Slow J =

Portuguese rapper

- Born: João Batista Coelho; 21 September 1992 (age 34); Setúbal, Portugal
- Genre: Hip hop tuga
- Occupations: Singer-songwriter, record producer
- Instruments: Voice; Piano; Guitar
- Years active: 2013–present
- Label: Sente Isto
- Website: www.slowj.pt

João Batista Coelho (born 21 September 1992), mostly known by his stage name Slow J, is a Portuguese rapper, record producer and singer-songwriter.

== Discography ==
=== Albums ===
| Title | Details | Peak chart positions |
| Title | Details | POR |
|---|---|---|
| The Free Food Tape | Released: 25 April 2015 (POR); Label: Format: CD, digital | — |
| The Art of Slowing Down | Released: 17 March 2017 (POR); Label: Sente Isto; Format: CD, digital | — |
| You Are Forgiven | Released: 20 September 2019 (POR); Label: Sente Isto; Format: CD, digital | 42 |
| Afro Fado | Released: 24 November 2023 (POR); Label: Sente Isto; Format: CD, digital | 1 |

=== Extended plays ===
| Title | Details |
|---|---|
| The Free Food Tape | Released: 25 April 2015 (POR); Format: CD, vinyl, digital |

=== Singles ===
==== As lead artist ====
List of singles, with selected details and chart positions
| Title | Year | Peak chart positions | Weeks | Certifications | Album |
| Title | Year | POR | Weeks | Certifications | Album |
|---|---|---|---|---|---|
| "Nunca Pares" (with Lhast, feat. Plutónio, Papillon) | 2018 | — | | | Non-album single |
| "Teu Eternamente" | 2019 | 8 | 60 | AFP: Platinum | You Are Forgiven |
| "Lágrimas" | 2019 | 14 | 5 | | You Are Forgiven |
| "Mea Culpa" | 2019 | 23 | 3 | | You Are Forgiven |
| "Muros" | 2019 | 26 | 5 | | You Are Forgiven |
| "Onde é que estás?" | 2019 | 17 | 5 | | You Are Forgiven |
| "Silêncio" | 2019 | 13 | 7 | | You Are Forgiven |
| "Só Queria Sorrir" | 2019 | 7 | 26 | AFP: Gold | You Are Forgiven |
| "FAM" (featuring Papillon) | 2019 | 5 | 26 | AFP: Gold | You Are Forgiven |
| "Também Sonhar" (featuring Sara Tavares) | 2019 | 6 | 23 | AFP: Gold | You Are Forgiven |
| "Grandeza" | 2023 | 61 | 4 | | Non-album single |

==== As featured artist ====
List of singles as featured artist, with selected chart positions and certifications
| Title | Year | Peak chart positions | Album |
| Title | Year | POR | Album |
|---|---|---|---|
| "Alma Velha" (Valas featuring Slow J, produced Lhast) | 2017 | — | Check-in |
| "Puristas" (Beatbombers featuring Slow J) | 2017 | — | Beatbombers LP |
| "Water" (Richie Campbell featuring Slow J and Lhast) | 2017 | 5 | Lisboa |
| "Melodia-me" (Fábia Maia featuring Slow J, produced by SuaveYouKnow) | 2017 | — | Melodia-me (EP) |
| "Imbecis / Íman" (Papillon featuring Slow J, produced by Slow J and Holly) | 2018 | — | Deepak Looper |
| "Repetido" (Carlão featuring Slow J) | 2018 | — | Entretenimento? |
| "Encontrar" (Holly(prod.) featuring Slow J) | 2019 | — | Avenal 2500 |
| "2020" (Lhast featuring Slow J, produced Charlie Beats) | 2020 | — | Non-album singles |
| "Caro" (X-Tense and Slow J) | 2022 | — | Non-album singles |
| "Dias" (T-Rex featuring Slow J) | 2022 | — | Cor D'Agua |
"—" denotes a recording that did not chart or was not released in that territory.
