= 1788-L =

American DJ and producer (born 1988)

- Born: David Andrew Lunson; January 7, 1988 (age 38); Austin, Texas, U.S.
- Genres: Midtempo bass; EDM; electro-industrial; dubstep; drum & bass; synthwave
- Occupations: Record producer; DJ; musician
- Instrument: Digital audio workstation
- Years active: 2018–present
- Labels: Deadbeats; OWSLA; mau5trap; HypnoVizion
- Website: 1788-l.com

David Andrew Lunson (born January 7, 1988), known as 1788-L, is an American DJ and electronic music producer. He rose to fame in 2018 with a remix of Virtual Self's "Particle Arts" uploaded onto his SoundCloud account. Other releases following this include "Multiverse" (with 4AM) and a remix of Daft Punk's "Rinzler".

== Career ==
On January 26, 2018, 1788-L uploaded his debut release, "Replica", on SoundCloud. A digital download release of his song was issued on February 2, 2018. On February 9, 2018 he released a remix of "Particle Arts" by Virtual Self. On March 2, 2018, a remix of Daft Punk's "Rinzler" (from Tron: Legacy) was released, and premiered on Dancing Astronaut. On March 30, 2018, a remix of "Radioactivity" by Kraftwerk was released on all platforms. His debut extended play, Sentience, which comprises four tracks was released on August 24, 2018, through Zeds Dead' label, Deadbeats.

1788-L performed his first live show in July 2018 in Los Angeles, California.

In June 2023, he released a new track on Mau5trap called “XENOCLONE” from his debut album ALPHA+.

== Discography ==
=== Studio albums ===
Title	Details
ALPHA+	Release Date: September 22, 2023; Label: mau5trap; Format: Digital download

=== Extended plays ===
Title	Details
Sentience	Released: August 24, 2018; Label: Deadbeats; Format: Digital download
Synthetik	Released: April 26, 2019; Label: Deadbeats; Format: Digital download
Parallel: S	Released: April 2, 2021; Label: Deadbeats; Format: Digital download
Nu-Type Vol. 1	Released: November 29, 2024; Label: HypnoVizion; Format: Digital download
2019	Released: October 29, 2026; Label: Self-released; Format: Digital download

=== Singles ===
Title	Year	Album
"Replica"	2018	Non-album singles
"Pulsar Beam"	2018	Non-album singles
"Multiverse" (with 4AM)	2018	Non-album singles
"Destiny" (with Blanke)	2018	Non-album singles
"Sound of Where'd U Go" (with Illenium, Kerli, and Said the Sky)	2018	Awake (Remixes)
"Cyberspace"	2018	Non-album single
"Hex" (with Rezz)	2018	Certain Kind of Magic
"Full Burst" (with Totto)	2018	Sentience
"Nu Ver Ka"	2018	Sentience
"Abyss" (with Tynan)	2018	Non-album singles
"Ruin" (with Ekali)	2019	Non-album singles
"Malfunkt" (with Deathpact)	2019	Synthetik
"Momentary Lapse" (with The Glitch Mob)	2019	Non-album singles
"Automaton"	2021	Parallel: S
"Hi-Tech"	2021	Non-album singles
"Baseline Test"	2022	Non-album singles
"Xenoclone"	2023	ALPHA+
"Sabernetiks"	2023	ALPHA+
"Break Limit"	2023	ALPHA+
"Wartype" (with Quackson)	2024	Nu Type Vol. 1
"Wasp.exe"	2024	Nu Type Vol. 1
"Pull Up"	2025	Non-album singles
"Fck Around" (with DJ Ride)	2025	Non-album singles

=== Other appearances ===
Title	Year	Album
"Ark" (with Kayzo)	2019	Unleashed
"Crashing vs. Destiny" (with Illenium and Blanke featuring Bahari)	2020	Ascend (Tour Edits)
"Illuminate" (with Blanke)	2026	Edge of the World

=== Remixes ===
Title	Year	Original artist(s)
"Particle Arts"	2018	Virtual Self
"Rinzler"	2018	Daft Punk
"Radioactivity"	2018	Kraftwerk
"Would You Ever"	2018	Skrillex (featuring Poo Bear)
"Disinstegrate Slowly"	2018	The Glitch Mob
"Era"	2018	RL Grime
"Halloween Theme"	2019	John Carpenter
"Phoenix"	2019	League of Legends
"All My Friends"	2020	Madeon
"Fuck U Love U"	2023	Alison Wonderland
"Munch"	2024	Ice Spice
"Rumble"	2024	Skrillex, Fred Again.., Flowdan
"Unholy"	2024	Sam Smith, Kim Petras
"Elite"	2025	Deftones
"Replica VIP"	2026	1788-L
"Can't Stop"	2026	Red Hot Chili Peppers
