= As the Pendulum Swings =

Studio album by Rezz
- Released: 12 September 2025
- Genre: Electronic
- Length: 43:19
- Label: HypnoVizion
- Producer: Rezz

Rezz chronology
Can You See Me? (2024)	As the Pendulum Swings (2025)	A Shift In Perspective (2026)

Singles from As the Pendulum Swings
- 1. "Contorted" Released: 23 April 2025; 2. "Telepathy" Released: 8 May 2025; 3. "Prophecy" Released: 27 June 2025; 4. "Downward" Released: 23 August 2025

As the Pendulum Swings is the fifth studio album by Canadian electronic music producer Rezz, released through her HypnoVizion Records imprint on 12 September 2025.

== Background and composition ==
The album serves as Rezz's follow up to Can You See Me?, which she released in March 2024. Rezz drew inspiration from elements of French electro and "dark, moody techno" for the album. Jason Heffler of EDM.com wrote that the album's track "Running From Yourself" contains "an eerie vocal breath sample [that] sets the scene before she uncorks a writhing drop that channels the industrial French electro of Justice". Like with her previous works, several tracks on the album feature other artists. Dillon Francis & BRVMES, k?d, EDDIE, fknsyd, CABLE, Owl Vision, and Chuurch are among those featured on the album. The final album contained 13 tracks, with many of them being finalized versions of early demos she worked on earlier in her career.

== Promotion and release ==
On 23 April and 8 May 2025, Rezz released "Contorted" and "Telepathy", respectively. The two singles would be included as tracks on the album. On 27 June, Rezz released the single "Prophecy", which serves as the album's intro song; further, the album's title was officially announced as As the Pendulum Swings. On 23 August, she released the single "Downward", a collaboration with Owl Vision.

The album was released on 12 September 2025, through her own HypnoVizion label. She also announced several 2025 and 2026 dates for her "As the Pendulum Swings Tour" upon the album's release.

== Track listing ==
As the Pendulum Swings track listing
No.	Title	Producer(s)	Length
1.	"Prophecy"	Rezz; No Mana	5:15
2.	"Contorted"	Rezz; No Mana	3:19
3.	"Telepathy" (with Chuurch)	Rezz; Chuurch	3:44
4.	"Running From Yourself"	Rezz	3:30
5.	"Glass Veins" (with Cable)	Rezz; Cable	3:08
6.	"Zone" (with Eddie)	Rezz; Eddie	3:40
7.	"Incantation" (with fknsyd)	Rezz	2:30
8.	"Substance" (with k?d)	Rezz; k?d	4:24
9.	"How I Do It" (with Dillon Francis & BRVMES)	Rezz; Dillon Francis; BRVMES	2:28
10.	"Downward" (with Owl Vision)	Rezz; Owl Vision	2:42
11.	"Upper"	Rezz	2:59
12.	"Blue People"	Rezz	2:51
13.	"Delirium" (with isqa, featuring fknsyd)	Rezz; isqa	2:46

Notes

- "Incantation" and "How I Do It" are stylized in all caps.
