= Hex (song) =

Single by Rezz and 1788-L

from the album Certain Kind of Magic
- Released: 29 June 2018
- Genre: New beat
- Length: 3:27
- Label: Mau5trap
- Songwriter: Isabelle Rezazadeh * Unknown composer author
- Producers: Isabelle Rezazadeh; 1788-L

Rezz singles chronology
"Witching Hour" (2018)	"Hex" (2018)	"Flying Octopus" (2018)

"Hex" (stylized as H E X) is a song by Canadian electronic music producer Rezz and American electronic music producer 1788-L, released by Canadian record label Mau5trap on 29 June 2018 as the second single from Rezz's second album Certain Kind of Magic.

== Background and release ==
The song was featured at several electronic music festivals such as the Electric Daisy Carnival and the Ultra Music Festival before release; it was released as a digital download on 29 June 2018. Upon release, Rezazadeh commented about the song, writing "'Hex' is one of my heavier tracks. It was one of the easiest and most fluid collaborations I have ever done."

The song was released as part of Rezazadeh's second studio album titled Certain Kind of Magic released on 3 August 2018. It was the second track on the album, which also includes seven other songs.

== Critical reception ==
"Hex" was well received by most critics. Writing for EDM Chicago, Marisa Mackowiak stated that Rezz continues to prove "her dominance over the bass music scene and 1788-L only further cements his reputation to be a force to reckon with." Cassie Sheets of Nest HQ wrote that the song is a "fast-track lane to the depths of hell, with enough force to shatter the frozen, ice lake and let loose all of the sinful creatures which lurk below." Billboard's William Selviz called the song "industrial and eerie, exactly what Rezz fans have come to know and love from their space mom queen", writing that it "creeps under the skin and lives in your brain for weeks." Lindsey Oh of Dancing Astronaut wrote that the song blended the two artists' styles to "effortlessly from the spooky build-up to the heavy and welcomely abrasive drop they mesmerize listeners and transport them to a place of bass, lasers and head-banging." Nick Yopko of EDM.com described the song as one of the most energetic tracks that he had seen from either producer. Writing for We Rave You, Alexander Costello stated that the song stayed true to the "dark-toned nature" of Rezazadeh's previous work, writing that the song is one of her heavier productions. This Song Slaps' Alejandro Vega noted the song's use of Rezazadeh's use of plucks and 1788-L's basslines, calling the song "mid-Tempo goodness." Jeanette Kats of Noiseporn wrote that the song opened with a "signature ominous Rezz melody" and called the songs' drops one of the heaviest she had heard from Rezazadeh yet.

== Track listing ==
Digital download
No.	Title	Length
1.	"Hex"	3:27
Total length:		3:27

== Release history ==
Region	Date	Format	Version	Label	Ref.
Worldwide	29 June 2018	Digital download	"Hex" - Single	Mau5trap	
Worldwide	3 August 2018	Digital download	Certain Kind of Magic	Mau5trap	
