= Certain Kind of Magic =

Studio album by Rezz
- Released: August 3, 2018
- Recorded: 2017–18
- Genres: New beat; electronic; emo
- Length: 27:30
- Label: Mau5trap
- Producers: Rezz; 1788-L; Fytch; 13; Kotek; Deathpact

Rezz chronology
Mass Manipulation (2017)	Certain Kind of Magic (2018)	Beyond The Senses (2019)

Singles from Certain Kind of Magic
- 1. "Witching Hour" Released: June 4, 2018; 2. "Hex" Released: June 29, 2018; 3. "Flying Octopus" Released: July 19, 2018

Certain Kind of Magic is the second studio album by Canadian electronic music producer Rezz. The album was released by Canadian record label Mau5trap on August 3, 2018. It contains eight songs, including collaborations with electronic music producers 1788-L, Deathpact, Kotek, 13 and Fytch. The album was released with three singles, a music video, and a tour. It gathered generally positive reviews.

== Background and release ==
On May 10, 2018, Rezz announced that she had finished producing her sophomore studio album, nine months after the release of her previous album, Mass Manipulation. On 1 June, she announced that her second studio album was titled Certain Kind of Magic, revealing the album art and announcing the release date as August 3, 2018. The album artwork was made by Chicago-based freelance artist Luis Colindres, who had previously worked with Rezz to create the cover art for her previous albums Mass Manipulation and Something Wrong Here.

Two singles were planned to be released in June, with a third being planned to release in the following month. She announced the song "Witching Hour" as the first single released from her upcoming album. The single was to be released on June 8, though she later notified fans that she decided to release the song four days earlier, on June 4, 2018 as a digital download.

Several songs were played live before their or the album's release. The song "Hex" was featured at several electronic music festivals such as the Electric Daisy Carnival and the Ultra Music Festival before release before being released as the second single on 29 June 2018. "The Crazy Ones", a collaboration between Rezz and electronic music producer 13, debuted at Wobbleland 2018 before being released as part of the album.

To promote the album's release, a music video for the third single "Flying Octopus" was released on July 19, 2018 through Rezz's YouTube channel. To promote Certain Kind of Magic, the album's three singles were released through the months of June and July until its release. Its lead single, "Witching Hour" was released on June 4, 2018, "Hex" on June 29, 2018, and "Flying Octopus" on 19 July 2018. On August 3, 2018, the album was released exclusively as a digital download on international digital stores through Mau5trap. After the album's official release, Rezz began her North American Certain Kind of Magic Tour on August 2, 2018.

== Critical reception ==
Certain Kind of Magic was well received by most critics. Writing for Billboard, Kat Bein noted Rezz's sound and style, writing that it is "one minor key exploited through various textural filters, and it comes to life in a variety of shades on her new album, Certain Kind of Magic, but if you're looking for a lot of growth on that motif, you still have some waiting to do." Writing for Your EDM, Matthew Meadow noted that the songs "Teleportal" and "Toxin" standout from the rest of the album, describing the album as "feeling more cohesive and put together than her first album, and that's only to be expected after receiving feedback and working harder than ever before." EDM Identity's Jayce Ullah-Blocks criticized Rezz for the lack of diversity between her songs, describing them and sounding very similar and struggles to "find a connection with them past surface-level", although he later wrote that the album attempts to dispute the criticism, stating that it was "taking steps in unfamiliar directions while still remaining true to [Rezz's] style." Jeanette Kats of Noiseporn praised the album, calling it Rezz's best work to date. Nest HQ's Cassie Sheets compared the album to Rezz's previous works, describing it as a "profound and as a bold leap in an already promising career", further writing that it tells a story, "both as an album and overarching as the realization of her entire career thus far, building on each previous release." Writing for EDM.com, Nick Yopko praised the album, calling it Rezz at her absolute finest and calling it the "most exciting electronic albums of the year", writing "her greatest trick is her ability to create infectious basslines that send you deeper into the abyss with every pounding note and this album is the perfect showcase of those skills." Dancing Astronaut's Christ Stack noted Rezz's growth in sound as "expectedly wider and deeper", writing that Rezz is "the epitome of artistry through and through, and maybe it takes a Certain Kind of Magic for other's within her grasp to realize."

Michael Cooper of Dancing Astronaut stated that "Witching Hour" acts as proof that "[Rezz] isn't slowing down one bit", noting the song for its "spidery, skittering percussion and reverb-heavy synth lines to set a fitting ominous mood." Your EDM's Matthew Meadow wrote that the song was a "stellar introduction to the new Rezz sound on the album", describing it as a mix between her usual style with an "invigorated drive and purpose". Jayce Ullah-Blocks of EDM Identity stated that he couldn't help but enjoy the track, describing it as having a "sort of alien forcefulness about it." Writing for Nest HQ, Cassie Sheets wrote that the song set the tone for the album, describing it as a resemblance to that of an "eerie, supernatural Victorian era with parallels to the minds of Stevenson or Shelley, known for Dr Jekyll and Mr Hyde and Frankenstein, respectively."

Lindsey Oh of Dancing Astronaut wrote that "Hex" blended the two artists' styles to "effortlessly from the spooky build-up to the heavy and welcomely abrasive drop they mesmerize listeners and transport them to a place of bass, lasers and head-banging." Cassie Sheets of Nest HQ wrote that the song is a "fast-track lane to the depths of hell, with enough force to shatter the frozen, ice lake and let loose all of the sinful creatures which lurk below." Billboard's William Selviz called the song "industrial and eerie, exactly what Rezz fans have come to know and love from their space mom queen", writing that it "creeps under the skin and lives in your brain for weeks." Writing for Dancing Astronaut, Christ Stack described the song as confident, writing that "1788-L's static rhetoric and hiccup melody combined with Rezz's defying narrative and drums create a strong presence, almost like the listener is in an unstoppable spell or hex from the heavily electronic bass music heavyweights."

Writing for Your EDM, Matthew Meadow noted "Flying Octopus" song was much more relaxed when compared to Rezz's previous works, writing that because of the slower tempo that the song was written in (around 80 to 90 beats per minute), the song was one of the most atmospheric tracks she had produced yet. Jayce Ullah-Blocks of EDM Identity described the song as a "soundtrack to trudging through a pool of molasses and feels less like the hypnosis Rezzbians speak of and more like a lullaby." Writing for Nest HQ, Cassie Sheets wrote that Rezz had found solid ground with the song and "slows down the journey while continuing to build the haunting atmosphere." Dancing Astronaut's Christ Stack described the song's hook as a kind of "conviction that lifts octopuses to space and then the beyond as demonstrated by her music video."

EDM Identity's Jayce Ullah-Blocks compared "Life & Death" to the previous song, "Flying Octopus", stating that the former was a different story and that with "hiccupped wubs and chilling alien gargles, this collaboration with Deathpact is a hip-shaking tune that rejuvenates the soul before it's snatched away with each staccato wobble." Noiseporn's Jeanette Kats wrote that Rezz "proves her production ability knows no limits", calling it the "most surprising single on the album." Cassie Sheets for Nest HQ, Cassie Sheets described the song as one of the most memorable productions, writing that "the pair dodge expectations and present the unpredictable." Christ Stack of Dancing Astronaut described the song's progression as a "rhythmic rendition with metallic high hats in place, life and death seem to coincide with each other."

Nest HQ's Cassie Sheets wrote that "Spider on the Moon" demonstrated Rezz's "natural intuition on the equal importance of the absence of sound", describing the song as a "dichotomy between the robust, sub-bass characteristics and the rich, glistening melodic intonations." Writing for Dancing Astronaut, Christ Stack noted the songs prominent theme of outer space, writing "Rezz's varied, clicking synths and grounded bass sounds like a giant spider on firm ground."

Writing for EDM Identity, Jayce Ullah-Blocks described "Teleportal" as reminiscent of 1788-L's style, writing "The electrifying bass rips are back, broken up by stippling silence blurbs. Again, there's an intensity that's nearly indescribable." Nina Chiang of EDMTunes called the songs' synths as "Amphibian-like", writing that the song will make you "tumble like a rickety Jenga tower." Cassie Sheets of Nest HQ described the song as a "jazz-influenced, cathartic emotional release that demands all attention."

EDMTunes' Nina Chiang described "The Crazy Ones" as a song that relies "as much on there absence of sounds as the presence of it", further writing that "it'll make you shiver with each drop that alternates between head bobbing bursts and muted pulsing bars." Cassie Sheets of Nest HQ wrote that the song is the "sole composition of the album in a major key and the manic realization of pure, sonic hysteria." Writing for Dancing Astronaut, Christ Stack described the song's hook as one that contains a "contrast between static and single synth melodies that sounds like an indecisive conversation between the interworking personalities of a deranged one."

Jayce Ullah-Blocks of EDM Identity wrote that "Toxin" shows Rezz exploring new soundscapes, writing that the song does not contain a "dark, gritty and discombobulated" bass that Rezz is known for and that instead "we are blessed with hauntingly beautiful vocals and an emotional swarm of bass and air-light chimes." Writing for Noiseporn, Jeanette Kats wrote that the song proves that Rezz's punk influences remain intact, describing the collaboration with Fytch delivers an "edgy and unexpected result." Nest HQ's Cassie Sheets described the song as "emo-inspired", writing that the song is like if Rezz said "I'm going to make whatever I want. It's all possible and real inside my head." Christ Stack of Dancing Astronaut noted that the song is the only one featuring vocals, writing "from the percussion elements to the guitar sounding synth riffs, this is Rezz's most acoustic sound on Certain Kind of Magic and maybe ever."

== Track listing ==
Digital download
No.	Title	Producer(s)	Length
1.	"Witching Hour"	Rezz	3:12
2.	"Hex" (with 1788-L)	Rezz; 1788-L	3:27
3.	"Flying Octopus"	Rezz	2:59
4.	"Life & Death" (with Deathpact)	Rezz; Deathpact	3:09
5.	"Spider On the Moon"	Rezz	3:34
6.	"Teleportal" (with Kotek)	Rezz; Kotek	3:40
7.	"The Crazy Ones" (with 13)	Rezz; 13	3:52
8.	"Toxin" (with Fytch)	Rezz; Fytch	3:27
Total length:			27:30

== Charts ==
Chart (2018)	Peak position
US Dance/Electronic Albums (Billboard)	12
US Top Heatseekers (Billboard)	8
US Independent Albums (Billboard)	19

== Release history ==
Region	Date	Format	Label	Ref.
Various	August 3, 2018	Digital download	Mau5trap	
