= Rezz =

Canadian DJ and record producer

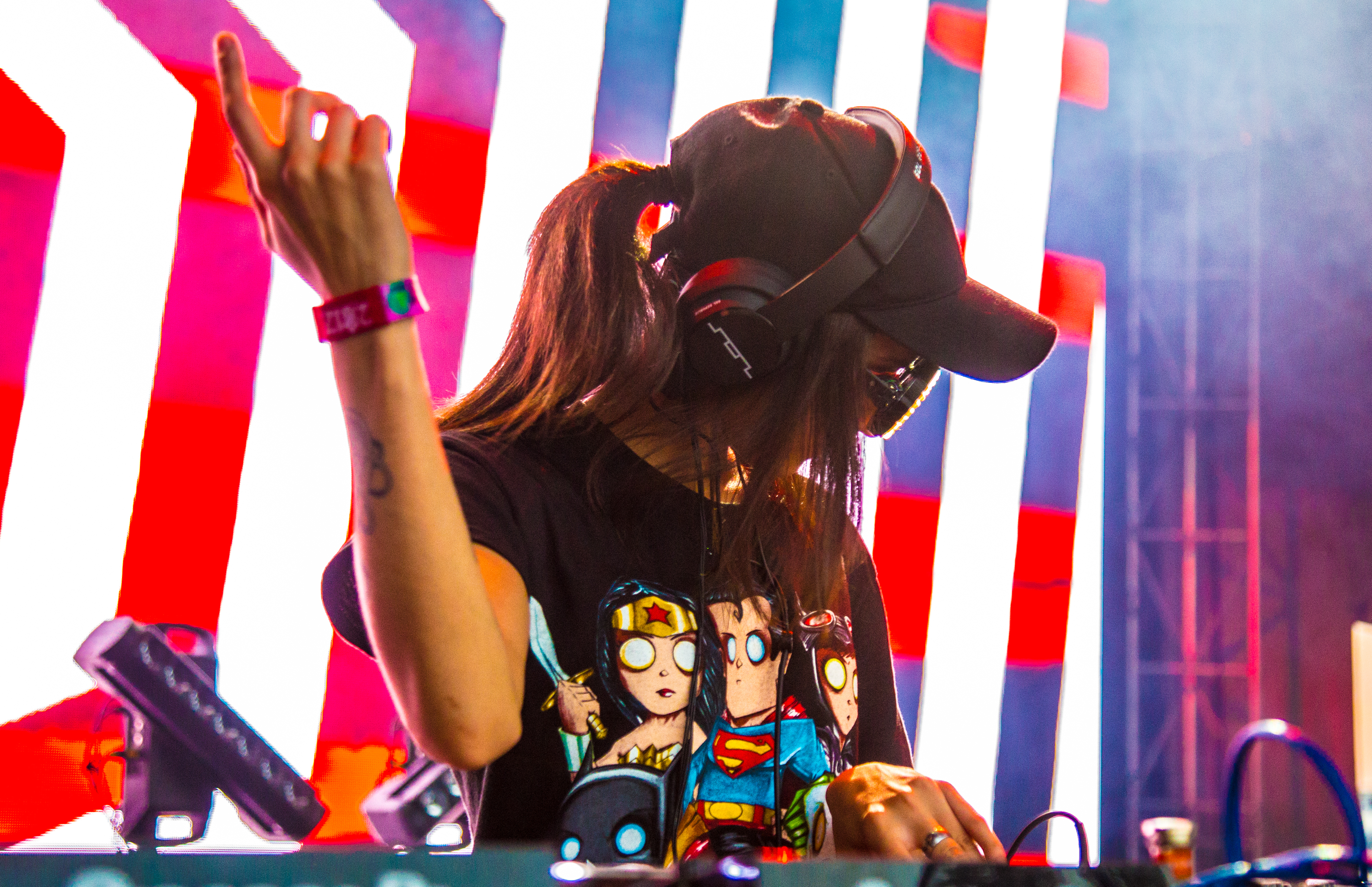
- Rezz in 2017

Background information
- Born: Isabelle Rezazadeh; 28 March 1995 (age 31); Kharkiv, Ukraine
- Origin: Niagara Falls, Ontario, Canada
- Genres: EDM; electronic; new beat/midtempo bass; pop punk; techno
- Occupations: DJ; record producer
- Instrument: Digital audio workstation
- Years active: 2015–present
- Labels: Mau5trap; Owsla; HypnoVizion; Monstercat; RCA Records
- Member of: REZZMAU5
- Spouse: Sydney Fisher (m. 2024)
- Website: officialrezz.com

Isabelle Rezazadeh (born 28 March 1995), who is known by her stage name Rezz (stylized in all caps), is a Ukrainian–Canadian DJ and record producer from Niagara Falls, Ontario.

Rezz released her debut extended play (EP) Insurrection in 2015 through Owsla's sub-label Nest HQ. In 2016, she signed with record label Mau5trap and released her follow-up EPs The Silence is Deafening and Something Wrong Here. Through Mau5trap, Rezz released her debut studio album Mass Manipulation (2017) and Certain Kind of Magic (2018). She released her third album Spiral (2021) through RCA Records. She then founded her own label HypnoVizion Records, through which she released her fourth album Can You See Me? (2024), which focuses on a bass music sound. Her fifth album As the Pendulum Swings (2025) drew inspiration from French electro and dark techno.

== Early life ==
Isabelle Rezazadeh was born on 28 March 1995 in Ukraine to a Ukrainian mother and an Iranian father; she moved to Canada at a young age. The family settled in Niagara Falls. While attending high school there, Rezz worked at a branch of Hard Rock Cafe.

Rezz began DJing at the age of 16, playing music by other artists until she became inspired by a Deadmau5 concert to create her own. According to Rezz, she knew she wanted to work in the music industry when she was 18.

== Career ==
=== 2013–2016: Early career ===
In 2013, Rezz started producing music on her laptop at her home in Niagara Falls, Ontario, and uploaded it to the music-sharing website SoundCloud. Early in her career, the American disc jockey (DJ) Skrillex noticed Rezz via a blog; he followed her and sent her a message via Twitter. She released Insurrection through NEST, a subsidiary of Skrillex's Owsla label, on 20 July 2015. Later that year, she released music on Deadmau5's record label Mau5trap and her track "Serenity" was included on the compilation album We Are Friends, Vol. 4 (2015).

In 2016, Rezz announced her first extended play (EP) The Silence is Deafening, which was released on the music label Mau5trap on 22 January 2016. Her second EP Something Wrong Here was released on Mau5trap on 7 October 2016; it charted in the United States, peaking at number 19 on the Billboard Dance Charts.

=== 2017–2018: Mass Manipulation and Certain Kind of Magic ===
In 2017, Mau5trap announced Rezz's debut studio album Mass Manipulation. On 7 July 2017, a music video for "Relax" was released on Mau5trap's YouTube channel to promote the album's release. Mass Manipulation was released on digital download stores on 4 August 2017, and as a vinyl LP on 6 October 2017. In 2018, Mass Manipulation was named the best Electronic Album of the Year at the Juno Awards.

On 1 June 2018, Rezz announced her second studio album Certain Kind of Magic. "Witching Hour", its lead single, was released on 4 June, and the second single "Hex", which was made in collaboration with 1788-L, was released later that month. The album was released on 3 August through Mau5trap.

=== 2019–2021: Beyond the Senses and Spiral ===
On 14 May 2019, Rezz announced on Twitter her EP Beyond the Senses was set for release on 24 July. She released the single "Dark Age" the following day. On 12 June, she released a collaboration titled "Falling" with the American band Underoath. It was accompanied by a music video that was released the same day, and an online VR listening party through WaveVR with VR Arcades across North America and also Otherworld in London taking part in physical events supporting the listening party.

Rezz is profiled in the 2020 documentary film Underplayed, and performed a DJ set following the film's Canadian premiere at the 2020 Toronto International Film Festival.

In 2021, Rezz collaborated with Deadmau5 to release a single named "Hypnocurrency" through Mau5trap. On 24 April, she performed a set at Porter Robinson's virtual music festival Secret Sky. On 21 May, Rezz released "Taste of You", a collaboration with Dove Cameron. Rezz released Spiral, her third album, on 19 November.

=== 2022–2024: HypnoVizion Records, It's Not a Phase, and Can You See Me? ===
In 2022, Rezz launched a label called HypnoVizion Records. The label's first release was a Halloween-themed mix and album entitled Nightmare on Rezz Street 2. On 21 April 2023, an EP entitled It's Not a Phase (styled in all caps) and described by the artist as "goth-punk" was announced and was released on 20 July.

On 13 October, Rezz and Deadmau5 released "Infraliminal", a rework of Deadmau5's 2012 song "Superliminal", as their debut single as REZZMAU5. An alternate version titled "Infraliminal (Isabelle's Version)" was released alongside the original. Speaking about the track and collaboration with deadmau5, Rezz cited "Superliminal" as her favourite deadmau5 track, stating: "That's one of the key songs that stunned me and I immediately had to learn to produce music. I put my own lil [sic] spin on it, while Joel also did his own lil [sic] spin". In January 2024, Rezz with Subtronics and Holly released collaborative singles titled "Black Ice" and "Dysphoria", respectively. She also announced her fourth album Can You See Me?, which was released on 14 March.

=== 2025−present: As the Pendulum Swings and A Shift in Perspective ===
In 2025, Rezz performed at the inaugural Force Fields music festival in Cadott, Wisconsin, held by the same organizers as Hoofbeat and Rock Fest. She also performed at VELD Music Festival, held in downtown Toronto. In March of that year, Anyma showcased a previously unreleased collaboration with Rezz at his Vegas Sphere show. On 12 September, Rezz released her fifth album titled As the Pendulum Swings and announced a six-date tour with shows in Paris, Boston, Brooklyn, Houston, Detroit, and St. Louis. Rezz became the first female DJ to headline at the Tacoma Dome on 26 September.

On 8 April 2026, Rezz released her A Shift in Perspective EP. That month, she performed at the Sahara Tent during the first weekend of the Coachella Festival. She then canceled her second weekend performance at the festival, The following month, Rezz announced an indefinite hiatus from touring and cancelled her remaining scheduled tour dates for the year, citing health reasons. In June, she announced she was writing a treatment for a psychological horror film and would be working on its accompanying soundtrack.

== Musical style and influences ==
Rezz is an electronic music producer and DJ; her sound has been described as "midtempo bass" and a modern styling of "new beat". In 2015, MTV called her the "new queen of the dark techno scene", writing she had been "making electronic and techy beats for two years" at that point. EDM.com's Niko Sani wrote Rezz's "deliciously ominous, often alien-sounding bass music" helped gain her popularity within the electronic music scene in around 2016. Other music writers have referred to Rezz's music as sounding "dark", as well as "menacing", "mechanical", "haunting and industrial". Spotify's outlet For the Record profiled Rezz, calling her "one of the most highly regarded producers of downtempo soundscapes", and saying she "strikes a firm balance between minimal original tech compositions and the all-heavy bass".

Rezz has described her music as "eerie, grungy, dungeon sounds". She has stated while growing up, she listened exclusively to bands, particularly punk and rock bands. My Chemical Romance, Bring Me the Horizon, and Underoath have been cited as such bands she listened to in her youth. She cited Silverstein as one band that she frequently listened to that had an influence on her EP It's Not A Phase. Deadmau5 is an early inspiration for Rezz. She has also mentioned Zeds Dead and Metric as fellow Canadian artists who have influenced her. Rezz is known for the signature LED spiraling "hypno glasses" she wears during live performances.

== Personal life ==
On 15 August 2023, Rezz announced her engagement to fellow musician and frequent collaborator Sydney Fisher, who is known by her stage name fknsyd. The couple held their wedding in September 2024.

== Discography ==
Studio albums

- Mass Manipulation (2017)
- Certain Kind of Magic (2018)
- Spiral (2021)
- Can You See Me? (2024)
- As the Pendulum Swings (2025)

== Awards and nominations ==
Year	Ceremony	Category	Nominee / Work	Result	Ref.
2018	Juno Awards	Electronic Album of the Year	Mass Manipulation	Won	
2019	Juno Awards	Electronic Album of the Year	Certain Kind of Magic	Nominated	
2020	Juno Awards	Electronic Album of the Year	Beyond the Senses	Won	
2021	Juno Awards	Dance Recording of the Year	"Someone Else"	Nominated	
2022	Juno Awards	Dance Recording of the Year	"Hypnocurrency"	Nominated	
2022	Electronic Dance Music Awards	Female Artist of the Year	Rezz	Nominated	
2023	Juno Awards	Dance Recording of the Year	Spiral	Nominated	
2023	Juno Awards	Electronic Album of the Year	Nightmare on Rezz Street 2	Nominated	
2023	Electronic Dance Music Awards	Female Artist of the Year	Rezz	Nominated	
2024	Electronic Dance Music Awards	Producer of the Year	Rezz	Nominated	
2025	Juno Awards	Dance Recording of the Year	"Give Into You" (with Virtual Riot featuring One True God)	Nominated	
2025	Electronic Dance Music Awards	Female Artist of the Year	Rezz	Nominated	
