= Mass Manipulation =

Studio album by Rezz
- Released: August 4, 2017
- Recorded: 2016–2017
- Genre: Electronic
- Length: 27:38
- Label: Mau5trap
- Producer: Isabelle Rezazadeh

Rezz chronology
Mass Manipulation (2017)	Certain Kind of Magic (2018)

Singles from Mass Manipulation
- 1. "Relax" Released: July 7, 2017; 2. "Diluted Brains" Released: July 14, 2017; 3. "Premonition" Released: July 21, 2017; 4. "Drugs!" Released: July 28, 2017

Mass Manipulation is the debut studio album by Canadian electronic music producer Rezz. It was released on August 4, 2017, through Canadian record label Mau5trap. The album was released with eight tracks including four singles, a music video, and a world tour and gathered generally positive reviews. The album peaked at number 16 on the US Billboard Dance/Electronic Albums chart on release. In 2018, Mass Manipulation won Electronic Album of the Year at the Juno Awards.

The album plays off of the idea of how heavily people consume through the media, curating how people think and dictating how people are supposed to live and behave. Its style has been described by online critics as inspired by science fiction and as the album's genre as 'industrial bass', 'dark house', and 'alien bass'. To promote the release of the album four singles were each released a week apart and an eponymous comic book was published a month after the release of the album.

== Background and release ==
Rezz said that the inspiration for the album was "the current state of society and how easily some can be manipulated". When asked about her influences, she stated:

"We consume heavily through the media, which, in turn, tries to curate our thoughts and dictate how we as humans are supposed to live and behave. This album plays off this idea and invites people to become hypnotized, allowing their brains to be manipulated by my music in the hope they might see things through a new perspective (perhaps an outer world viewpoint). One where everyone is free from the unrealistic expectations planet earth has drawn for them. A world of acceptance and hypnosis."

— Rezz talking about the influences on her production of the album

To promote Mass Manipulation, the album's four singles were released on the Friday of each week preceding its release. Its lead single, "Relax", was released on July 7, 2017, "Diluted Brains" on July 14, "Premonition" on July 21, and "Drugs!" on July 28. On August 4, 2017, the album was released exclusively as a digital download on international digital stores through Mau5trap.

After the album's official release, Rezz began her Mass Manipulation World Tour on September 2, 2017. The tour began in The United States before heading into Asia, heading back into The United States before heading to Europe on November 22, with the tour concluding in Australia on January 4, 2018. It received support from various artists including BlackGummy, Bleep Bloop, Crywolf, Drezo, Dr. Fresch, Electric Mantis, Eprom, Haywyre, K?d, Mad Zach, No Mana, The M Machine, and Zeke Beats.

To further promote the album's release, music videos for the first and third singles, "Relax" and "Premonition", were released on July 7 and 21, respectively, through Rezz's YouTube channel. In September 2017, Rezz unveiled a 60-page comic book with the same name as the album; it was illustrated by Luis Colindres, who had previously animated the music video for "Premonition" and who had previously designed cover art for Rezz. The comic book follows Rezz as she arrives on Earth from Neptune, hypnotizing the people of Earth with her music.

== Critical reception ==
Rezz – "Relax"
Various terms such as 'industrial bass', 'dark house' and 'alien bass' have been used to describe Rezz's subgenre of focus.

Mass Manipulation was well received by most critics. Writing for Billboard, Bryan Dellosa described the album as a sickly sci-fi journey and as an aural exploration, writing that there is "an ever-present sense of something sinister, like some monster lurking just on the periphery of your vision." Reid Golden of Noiseporn wrote that Rezz had procured a sound that hadn't been exercised by anyone else, calling Rezz's signature song structure genius and saying that "there's a reason it worked so well for her." EDM Identity's Tim Goth noted that although many of the tracks sounded similar and none of the tracks stood out, he felt that the album flowed together well and was easy to listen to repeatedly. Writing for We Rave You, Andy Hackbarth praised the album, calling it a "pure masterpiece" and writing that the album exemplifies her "techno and bass blends that few artists can match." Nest HQ's Molly Hankins noted that the album had an overall feeling of "something ominous lurking around every corner", writing that the album had revealed the "full capacity and scope" of Rezz's style. Will McCarthy of Dancing Astronaut wrote that the album had put forth her "innate, authentic sound with greater strength and clarity than ever before in her career."

Billboard placed the song "Drugs!" as the 38th best Dance/Electronic Songs of 2017. Dancing Astronaut listed Rezz's Mass Manipulation Tour as one of the top five electronic music tours of 2017. On February 7, 2018, The Canadian Academy of Recording Arts and Sciences announced the nominees for its 46th annual edition of the Juno Awards, among which it, was announced that Mass Manipulation was nominated for "Electronic Album of the Year". On March 25, it was announced that Rezz had beat out Blue Hawaii, CRi, Dabin and Kid Koala to win the award.

== Track listing ==
No.	Title	Length
1.	"Relax"	3:34
2.	"Diluted Brains"	4:07
3.	"Premonition" (with knodis)	4:34
4.	"Drugs!" (with 13)	3:17
5.	"Livid"	3:12
6.	"Green Gusher"	2:57
7.	"Synesthesia"	3:09
8.	"Ascension" (with Kotek)	3:28
Total length:		27:38

== Charts ==
Chart (2017)	Peak position
US Dance/Electronic Albums (Billboard)	16
US Top Heatseekers (Billboard)	14
US Independent Albums (Billboard)	30

== Awards ==
Year	Organization	Award	Result	Ref.
2018	Juno Awards	Electronic Album of the Year	Won	

== Release history ==
Country	Date	Format	Label	Ref.
Worldwide	August 4, 2017	Digital download	Mau5trap	
Worldwide	October 7, 2017	Vinyl	Mau5trap	
Worldwide	December 8, 2017	CD	Mau5trap	
