= Mau5trap =

Canadian record label

- Founded: 2007; 19 years ago
- Founder: Joel Zimmerman (Deadmau5)
- Status: Active
- Distributors: Create Music Group; Kobalt Music Group (former); Virgin Records (former); Ultra Music (former)
- Genre: Electronic; progressive house; electro house; trance; techno; drum and bass
- Country of origin: Canada
- Location: Hollywood, United States
- Official website: mau5trap.com

Mau5trap (pronounced "mousetrap") is a Canadian independent record label founded in 2007 by electronic music producer Deadmau5. The label was formerly a vanity label, hosting releases through labels such as Ultra Music, Virgin Records, and Astralwerks. The label most frequently releases techno and progressive house music.

Mau5trap has featured many notable artists, including Deadmau5 himself, Skrillex, Attlas, I_o, and Rezz. Mau5trap is best known for releasing Rezz's debut studio album "Mass Manipulation", Skrillex's "Scary Monsters and Nice Sprites" , and "Random Album Title" by Deadmau5.

== History ==
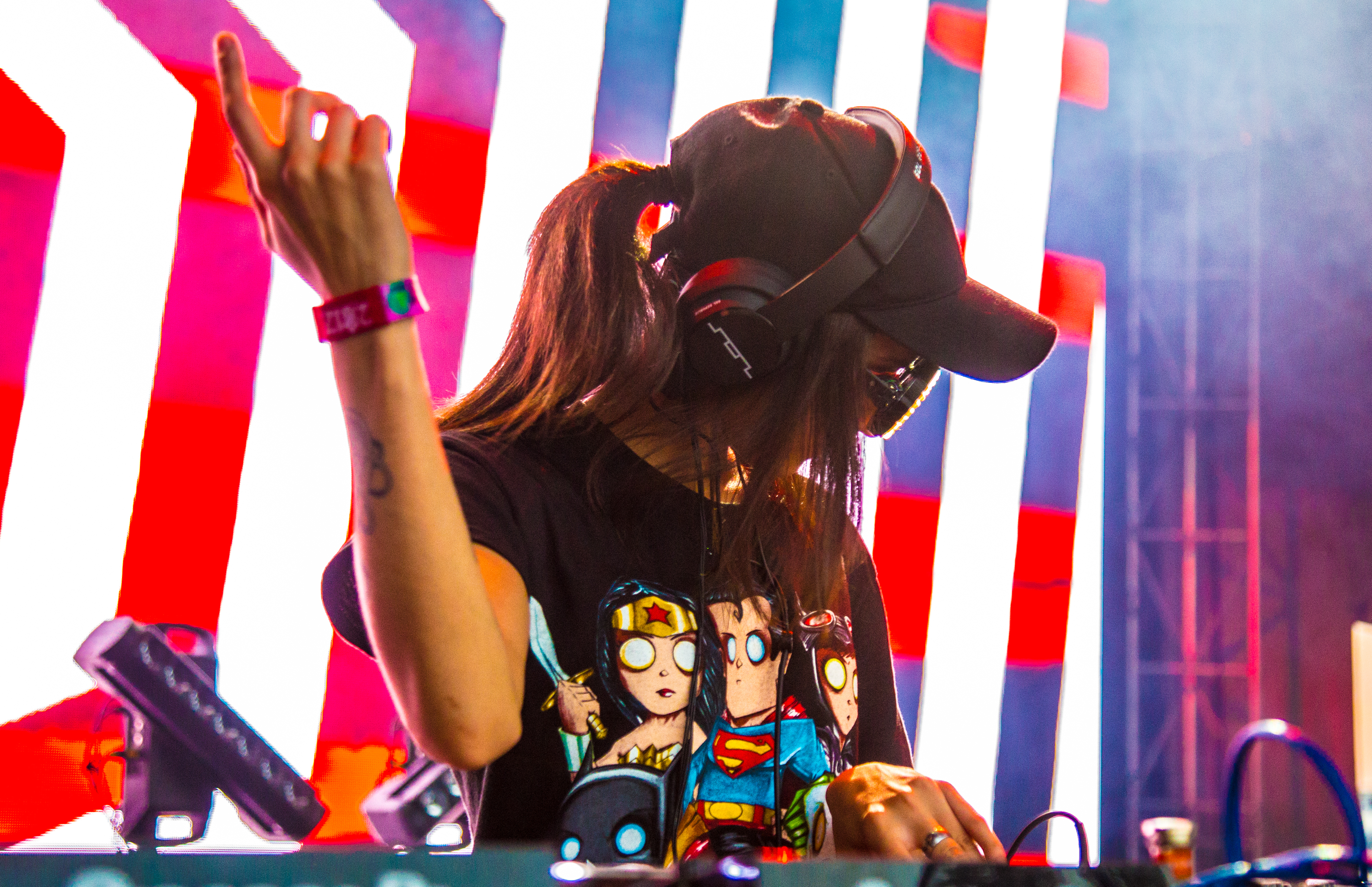
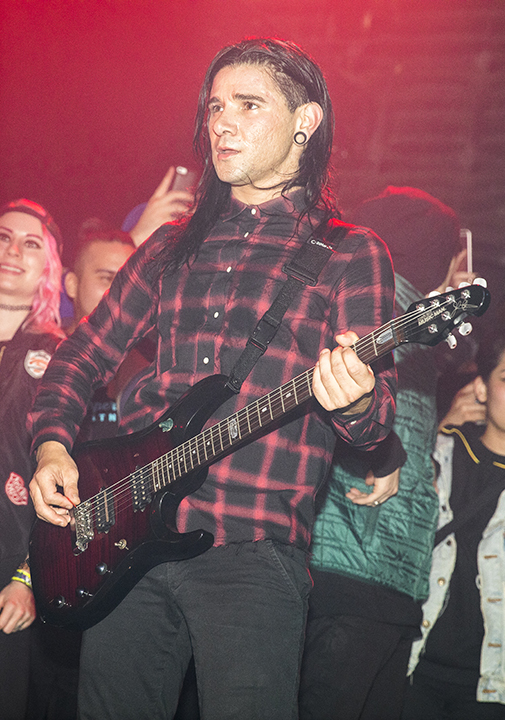
Rezz and Skrillex, both artists have released major albums through Mau5trap

In 2007, Mau5trap was founded by Canadian electronic music producer Deadmau5 (Joel Zimmerman). The label's first release was Zimmerman's "Faxing Berlin", also released by Play Records and Cinnamon Flava. The second artist on the label was Canadian DJ Glenn Morrison, which Zimmerman later revealed to have ghost produced for. In 2008, after more artists were signed to moderate success, Mau5trap partnered with Ultra Records and released Zimmerman's third studio album, Random Album Title to commercial success.

In 2010, Mau5trap signed American producer Skrillex, and released his second EP Scary Monsters and Nice Sprites in partnership with Big Beat Records. In 2012, Mau5trap signed English hip hop group Foreign Beggars and released their third studio album The Uprising, Moguai released his second studio album Mpire, Noisia released a special edition of Split the Atom, and Mau5trap debuted the first volume of the compilation series We Are Friends.

In 2013, following Zimmerman's departure from Ultra Records, Mau5trap ended their partnership with the former partner label. In June 2013, Mau5trap briefly partnered with Astralwerks, a subsidiary of Universal Music Group. In 2015, Mau5trap became a fully independent record label with music rights and publishing managed through Kobalt Music Group.

In 2016, Zimmerman's eighth studio album, W:/2016Album/, became Mau5trap's first fully independent album release. In 2017, Mau5trap also independently released the debut studio album by Canadian music producer Rezz, titled Mass Manipulation. In 2017, Mau5trap celebrated its tenth anniversary, and released a thirty-three–track compilation album titled Mau5trap Ten Year Anniversary.

On March 1, 2021, Mau5trap announced the formation of a new imprint under Mau5trap called "Hau5trap", which is meant to expand the Mau5trap catalogue of music to include house music. On March 4, 2025, the catalogue of Mau5trap as well as the discography of Deadmau5 was acquired by Create Music Group. Later that year, Mau5trap launched a 24-hour music livestream of select songs from the Mau5trap catalogue. On January 9, 2026, Mau5trap released disc one of We Are Friends, Vol. 12.

== Artists ==
- 13
- 1788-L
- Anakim
- Ashe
- Attlas
- Bandoum
- Bensley
- Bentley Dean
- BlackGummy
- Blue Mora
- Bluum
- BSOD
- Budd
- Buunshin
- C.H.A.Y.
- C.O.Z.
- Chris Lake
- Chris Waldt
- Colleen D'Agostino
- DeadSpace
- Deadmau5 (founder)
- Deathpact
- Dillon Nathaniel
- DJ Aero
- DkA
- Dom Kane
- Donny Carr
- Dronehands
- Dusty Kid
- Eddie
- Eekkoo
- Egomorph
- Electrocado
- Enamour
- Enzo Bennet
- Excision
- Feed Me
- Fehrplay
- Flip-Flop
- Floret Loret
- Foreign Beggars
- Frost
- Getter
- Ghost Dance
- Glenn Morrison
- Gyrofield
- Heyz
- HolyU
- Hot Mouth
- Hvdes
- i_o (deceased)
- Imanu
- James Njie
- Julian Gray
- Kairo Kingdom
- Kayve
- Keetz
- Kill the Noise
- Kindrid
- Lazy Rich
- Librae (alias of Frankyeffe)
- Low Poly
- Lunr
- Maison Ware
- Mariatti
- Mark Mackenzie
- Mat Zo
- Matt Lange
- Michael Woods
- Moguai
- Monstergetdown
- Mord Fustang
- Mr. Bill
- No Mana
- Nofone
- Noisia
- Nom De Strip
- Notaker
- Ocula
- Oliver Winters
- One True God
- Posij
- Proxy
- Raito
- RayRay
- Reuben Keeney
- Rezz
- Rhett
- Rinzen
- Robert Oaks (deceased)
- Sara Landry
- Seismal D
- SevenDoors
- Shay De Castro
- Shotty Horroh
- Sian
- Speaker Honey
- Speaker of the House
- Spencer Brown
- Steve Duda
- Svnf8
- Sydney Blu
- Sysdemes
- Thin King
- Tinlicker
- Tommy Lee
- Tommy Trash
