= Dust Bowl Ballads =

1940 studio album by Woody Guthrie

Studio album by Woody Guthrie
- Released: July 1940
- Recorded: April 26 and May 3, 1940
- Venues: Victor Records, New York
- Genres: Folk; Americana
- Length: 36:36
- Label: Victor
- Producer: Robert P. Weatherald

Woody Guthrie chronology
Dust Bowl Ballads (1940)	Nursery Days (1951)

Professional ratings
Review scores
Source	Rating
AllMusic (vol. 1)	5/5 stars
AllMusic (vol. 2)	5/5 stars

Dust Bowl Ballads is an album by American folk singer Woody Guthrie. It was released by Victor Records, in 1940. All the songs on the album deal with the Dust Bowl and its effects on the country and its people. It is considered to be one of the first concept albums. It was Guthrie's first commercial recording and the most successful album of his career.

Dust Bowl Ballads was originally released as eleven songs on two simultaneously released three-disc set albums of 78 rpm records titled Dust Bowl Ballads, Vol. 1 and Dust Bowl Ballads, Vol. 2. The twelve sides in total had one song each except for the double-sided "Tom Joad" which was too long to be pressed on a single side of a 78. However, two of the thirteen songs recorded on the sessions, "Pretty Boy Floyd" and "Dust Bowl Blues" were left out due to length. All of the tracks were recorded at Victor studios in Camden, New Jersey on April 26, 1940, except "Dust Cain't Kill Me" and "Dust Pneumonia Blues" which were recorded on May 3. In 1950, and in 1964 during the American folk music revival, reissues were released in LP format by Folkways Records after RCA refused Guthrie's request to re-issue the album. RCA Victor also re-released the album in 1964 but with the two previously unreleased tracks included, and in 2000 this was reissued by Buddha Records with an additional previously unreleased alternate version of one song. The complete Dust Bowl Ballads remains available on compact disc through Smithsonian Folkways.

Like many of Guthrie's later recordings, these songs contain an element of social activism, and would be an important influence on later musicians, including Pete Seeger, Bob Dylan, Bruce Springsteen, Phil Ochs and Joe Strummer.

== Background ==
Dust Bowl Ballads chronicles the 1930s Dust Bowl era during the Great Depression in the United States. In this era, thousands of farmers in the Great Plains area of United States, particularly in Oklahoma, faced a variety of hardships. There was an extended drought, which combined with farming techniques that depleted topsoil to in an attempt to increase yields of foods. When combined with heavy winds, these factors created the "dust bowl" storms of the album's title. Additionally, the broader economic trends of the early Great Depression led to many foreclosures as farmers struggled to maintain their loan payments. As a result, many mid-westerners in the US abandoned migrated, especially to California, in hopes of finding jobs and improving their conditions.

Guthrie was part of this culture himself, and knew many "Okies" who lived under these trying conditions. He learned traditional folk and blues songs and discovered his own version of the blues, one on which he’d play endless variations, earning him the nickname the "Dust Bowl Troubadour"

Victor Records was looking for a rival to successful folk singer Burl Ives on Columbia Records, so they signed 27-year-old Guthrie and put him in a recording studio. This would be the only major label for which Guthrie ever recorded. He later went on to record more with Moses Asch of Folkways Records.

On the liner notes for the Folkways Records reissue Woody Guthrie said:

I've lived in these duststorms just about all my life. (I mean, I tried to live). I met millions of good folks trying to hang on and to stay alive with the dust cutting down every hope. I am made out of this dust and out of this fast wind and I know that I'm going to win out on top of both of them if only my government and my office holder will help me. I wrote up these eight songs here to try to show you how it is to live under the wild and windy actions of the great duststorms that ride in and out and up and down.

== Songs and themes ==
The album is semi-autobiographical, mirroring both Guthrie’s own life and John Steinbeck’s 1939 novel The Grapes of Wrath, which had recently been turned into a film. The album follows the exodus of Midwesterners headed for California. Hailing from Oklahoma, Guthrie had a detailed knowledge of the Dust Bowl conditions that had led to an exodus of Okies west to California, and witnessed the economic hardships there where they became poor migrant workers in often harsh conditions.

Guthrie alternates between reporting the story, commenting on it humorously, and embodying the characters of the Okies with whom he identifies in songs. The humorous talking blues song "Talkin' Dust Bowl Blues", starts off telling the story in the first person of a family who had an average life of a farmer in Nineteen Twenty-Seven, before the drought started and then have to migrate after losing their farm. “The black ol' dust storm filled the sky and I swapped my farm for a Ford machine” sings Guthrie. Although it is done comically and Guthrie himself chuckles at the absurdity, it does not hide the horrifying circumstances they go through in their travels and arrival. "Blowin' Down This Road" has a more defiant tone with the repetition of the line "I ain't a-gonna be treated this-a-way."

After arrival in California, the Okie migrants realize California is not so welcoming and a rough place to settle if you do not have money, or "Do Re Mi". This is a cautionary tale to all those others traveling across the country who were dreaming of a promised land or “Garden of Eden” as Guthrie calls it in the song, telling them there’s so many people going to California it might be better to go back east. Guthrie captures the hopelessness of the crop and bank failures, the rigors of the journey west and the crushing disappointment that ensued when California offered a reality nearly as harsh as the land left behind. "Dust Cain't Kill Me" sets a darker tone, where Guthrie acknowledges the destruction wrought by the dust storms, killing his family, but still keeping a determined positive attitude that it would not kill him. The final song on Volume 1, split into two parts, tells the story of “Tom Joad", the leading character in Steinbeck's The Grapes of Wrath. "Wherever people ain’t free/Wherever men are fightin’ for their rights,” he sings, “That’s where I’m a-gonna be.”

Volume 2 starts out with the waltz "The Great Dust Storm", describing the catastrophe when a giant dust storm hits the Great Plains "On the fourteenth day of April of 1935", transforming the landscape and resulting in a diaspora of people heading west where they have been promised there is work aplenty picking fruit in the lush valleys of California. "Dusty Old Dust" follows, telling a similar story in a more humorous manner. The character says his farewell repeating “so long, it's been good to know yuh” in the chorus, which is what the song is now most commonly known as, as he has “got to be driftin' along”.

In "Dust Bowl Refugee", Guthrie tells a first-person story of the struggles and nomadic life of the travel out west. The comedic "Dust Pneumonia Blues" comments on the physical effects many experienced in the Dust Bowl. He notes the song was supposed to have yodeling in it, but he was unable to yodel because of the dust in his lungs. "I Ain't Got No Home in This World Anymore" uses a tune borrowed from the Christian hymn "Heaven Will Be My Home", the spiritual message is amended to one about the plight of the Okies. "Vigilante Man" is an attack on the hired thugs who harassed the Dust Bowl refugees, which contained a verse referring to Preacher Casey, a character in The Grapes of Wrath.

"Pretty Boy Floyd", added to the album in the 1964 RCA Victor and 2000 Buddha releases, tells the story of the famous outlaw Pretty Boy Floyd, an American bank robber who was pursued and killed by a group led by FBI Agent, Melvin Purvis. This song was written in March 1939, five years after Floyd’s death. Guthrie portrays Floyd as a misunderstood Robin Hood who was adored by many common people. The song mentions a thousand-dollar bill, then a symbol of wealth and oppulence.

== Track listing ==
=== 1940 Victor Records ===
All tracks are written by Woody Guthrie, except where noted.

Dust Bowl Ballads, Vol. 1
No.	Title	Notes	Length
1.	"Talkin' Dust Bowl Blues"	26619 – A	2:45
2.	"Blowing Down This Road" (Woody Guthrie & Lee Hays)	26619 – B	3:06
3.	"Do Re Mi"	26620 – A	2:40
4.	"Dust Can’t Kill Me"	26620 – B	2:58
5.	"Tom Joad-Part 1"	26621 – A	3:24
6.	"Tom Joad-Part 2"	26621 – B	3:30

Dust Bowl Ballads, Vol. 2
No.	Title	Notes	Length
1.	"The Great Dust Storm"	26622 – A	3:24
2.	"Dusty Old Dust" (later becoming known as "So Long, It's Been Good to Know Yuh")	26622 – B	3:09
3.	"Dust Bowl Refugee"	26623 – A	3:14
4.	"Dust Pneumonia Blues"	26623 – B	2:46
5.	"I Ain't Got No Home In This World Anymore"	26624 – A	2:50
6.	"Vigilante Man"	26624 – B	2:50

== Subsequent reissues ==
=== 1950 Folkways Records Reissue ===
Victor eventually let the original sets go out of print. Guthrie wrote to the label asking for a reissue in LP format and got a negative response. Guthrie then authorized Folkways Records to copy the discs and, in October 1950, Folkways put out its own 10" LP version. This was called Talking Dust Bowl and contained just eight tracks with the two sides subtitled into two groups of songs:

Side one: Dust Bowl Ballads
No.	Title	Length
1.	"Dust Storm Disaster"
2.	"So Long (Dusty Old Dust)"
3.	"Talking Dust Blues"
4.	"Dust Cain't Kill Me"

Side two: Migrant Worker's Songs
No.	Title	Length
1.	"Blowing Down This Road"
2.	"Dust Bowl Refugee"

Tom Joad (Ballad Based On John Steinbeck's "Grapes Of Wrath")
No.	Title	Length
3.	"Tom Joad, Part 1"
4.	"Tom Joad, Part 2"

=== 1964 Folkways Records Reissue ===
Dust Bowl Ballads

Compilation album by Woody Guthrie
- Released: 1964
- Genre: Folk
- Label: Folkways Records

Folkways Records Reissue ratings
Review scores
Source	Rating
AllMusic	4/5 stars

RCA protested, but, in the face of Guthrie's go-ahead, backed off, giving Folkways tacit permission to do a second reissue as a 12" LP. Released in 1964, this re-created the original titles and full contents of the 1940 releases of 78s in their original running order, but combined the two parts of "Tom Joad" into one track.

Side one
No.	Title	Length
1.	"Talkin' Dust Bowl Blues"
2.	"Blowin' Down This Road"
3.	"Do Re Mi"
4.	"Dust Cain't Kill Me"
5.	"Tom Joad (Part 1)" / "Tom Joad (Part 2)"

Side two
No.	Title	Length
1.	"The Great Dust Storm"
2.	"Dusty Old Dust"
3.	"Dust Bowl Refugee"
4.	"Dust Pneumonia Blues"
5.	"I Ain't Got No Home In This World Anymore"
6.	"Vigilante Man"

=== 1964 RCA Victor Records Reissue ===
RCA Victor Records Reissue ratings
Review scores
Source	Rating
Record Mirror	3/5 stars

RCA also re-released the album in 1964 in its RCA Victor Vintage Series, on a 12" LP with issue number LPV-502. Their re-release reshuffled the original order of tracks and took the opportunity to include the two extra songs recorded on the 1940 sessions and previously unreleased, being "Pretty Boy Floyd" and "Dust Bowl Blues".

Side one
No.	Title	Length
1.	"The Great Dust Storm"	3:22
2.	"I Ain't Got No Home In This World Anymore"	2:47
3.	"Talkin' Dust Bowl Blues"	2:42
4.	"Vigilante Man"	3:22
5.	"Dust Cain't Kill Me"	2:57
6.	"Pretty Boy Floyd"	3:08
7.	"Dust Pneumonia Blues"	2:46

Side two
No.	Title	Length
1.	"Blowin' Down This Road"	3:02
2.	"Tom Joad - Part 1"	3:27
3.	"Tom Joad - Part 2"	3:27
4.	"Dust Bowl Refugee"	3:06
5.	"Do Re Mi"	2:35
6.	"Dust Bowl Blues"	3:27
7.	"Dusty Old Dust"	3:07

=== 2000 Buddha Records Reissue ===
Dust Bowl Ballads

Compilation album by Woody Guthrie
- Released: May 23, 2000
- Genre: Folk
- Length: 45:44
- Label: Buddha Records

Professional ratings
Review scores
Source	Rating
AllMusic	5/5 stars
Rolling Stone	4/5 stars

Sixty years after the recordings were first released, Woody Guthrie's odes to the Dust Bowl were presented in their fourth different configuration for a CD edition digitally remastered by Doug Pomeroy. The running order of the tracks were again shuffled and a previously unreleased alternate take of "Talking Dust Bowl Blues" was added.

Dust Bowl Ballads (Buddha, 2000)
No.	Title	Length
1.	"The Great Dust Storm (Dust Storm Disaster)"	3:21
2.	"Talking Dust Bowl Blues"	2:42
3.	"Pretty Boy Floyd"	3:10
4.	"Dusty Old Dust (So Long It's Been Good to Know Yuh)"	3:09
5.	"Dust Bowl Blues"	3:27
6.	"Blowin' Down the Road (I Ain't Going to Be Treated This Way)"	3:04
7.	"Tom Joad, Pt. 1"	3:24
8.	"Tom Joad, Pt. 2"	3:30
9.	"Do Re Mi"	2:36
10.	"Dust Bowl Refugee"	3:07
11.	"I Ain't Got No Home"	2:46
12.	"Vigilante Man"	3:23
13.	"Dust Can’t Kill Me"	2:56
14.	"Dust Pneumonia Blues"	2:42
15.	"Talking Dust Bowl Blues (alternate version)"	2:27

== Tribute album ==
In 2021, Home in This World: Woody Guthrie’s Dustbowl Ballads, a track-by-track remake of Dust Bowl Ballads was released on Elektra Records featuring covers by Lee Ann Womack, Mark Lanegan, Watkins Family Hour, The Felice Brothers, Waxahatchee, John Paul White, and Parker Millsap among others.

== See also ==
- Moe Asch
- Alan Lomax
- The Grapes of Wrath
- Dust Bowl
- 1936 North American heat wave

== Sources ==
- Marsh, Dave. "Dust Bowl Ballads" liner notes. Buddha Records, 2000
- Helfert, Manfred. Ballads from Deep Gap, North Carolina and Okemah, Oklahoma. 1997.
