= The Grapes of Wrath =

1939 novel by John Steinbeck

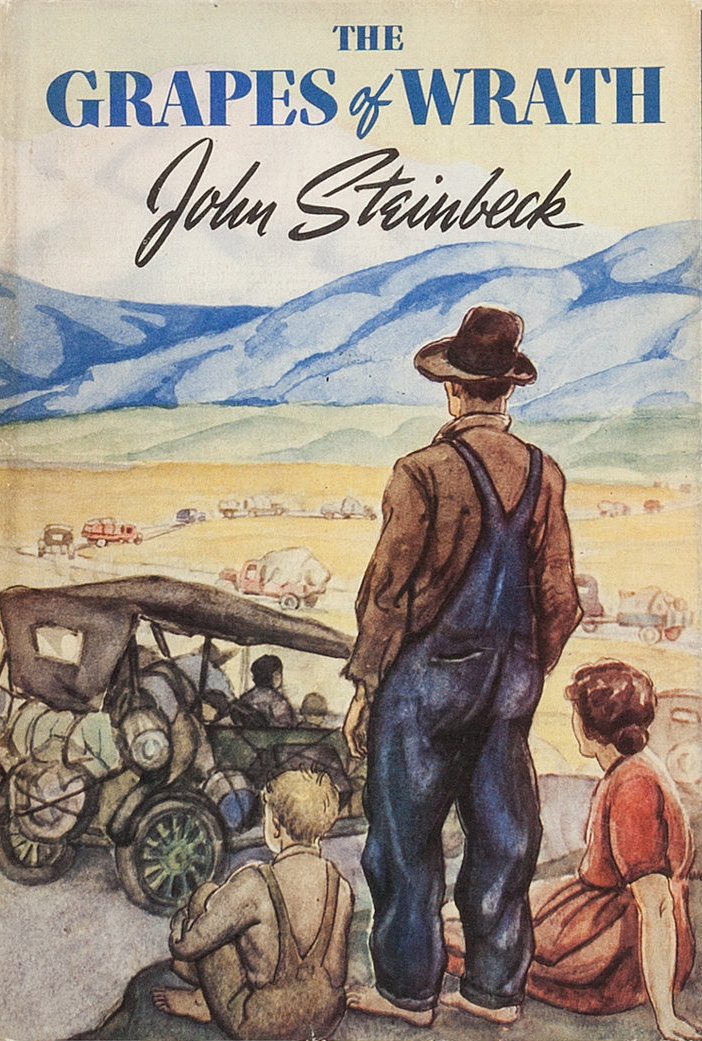
- First edition cover
- Author: John Steinbeck
- Cover artist: Elmer Hader
- Language: English
- Genre: Novel
- Publisher: The Viking Press-James Lloyd
- Publication date: April 14, 1939
- Publication place: United States
- Pages: 464
- OCLC: 289946
- Dewey Decimal: 813.52

The Grapes of Wrath is an American realist novel written by John Steinbeck and published in 1939. The book won the National Book Award and Pulitzer Prize for fiction, and it was cited prominently when Steinbeck was awarded the Nobel Prize in Literature in 1962.

Set during the Great Depression, the novel focuses on the Joads, a poor family of tenant farmers driven from their Oklahoma home by drought, economic hardship, agricultural industry changes, and bank foreclosures forcing tenant farmers out of work. Due to their nearly hopeless situation, and in part because they are trapped in the Dust Bowl, the Joads set out for California on the "mother road", along with thousands of other "Okies" seeking jobs, land, dignity, and a future.

The Grapes of Wrath is often listed as among the greatest novels in the English language and as a contender for the Great American Novel. It is frequently read in American high school and college literature classes due to its historical context and enduring legacy. A Hollywood film version, starring Henry Fonda and directed by John Ford, was released in 1940.

== Plot ==
The narrative begins just after Tom Joad is paroled from McAlester prison, where he had been incarcerated after being convicted of homicide, although he insisted that he acted in self-defense. While hitchhiking to his home near Sallisaw, Oklahoma, Tom meets former preacher Jim Casy, whom he remembers from childhood, and the two travel together. Arriving at Tom's childhood farm home, they find it deserted. Disconcerted and confused, Tom and Casy meet an old neighbor, Muley Graves, who says the family is at Uncle John Joad's home nearby. Graves says the banks have evicted all the farmers. They have moved away, but Muley refuses to leave the area.

The next morning, Tom and Casy go to Uncle John's. Tom's family is loading their remaining possessions into a Hudson sedan converted into a truck; with the crops destroyed by the Dust Bowl, the family has defaulted on their bank loans and their farm has been repossessed. The family sees no option but to seek work in California, which has been described in handbills as fruitful and offering high pay. The Joads put everything they have into making the journey. Although leaving Oklahoma violates his parole, Tom takes the risk, and invites Casy to join the family.

Traveling west on Route 66, the Joads find the road crowded with other migrants. In makeshift camps, they hear many stories from others, some returning from California. The group worries that California may not be as rewarding as suggested. The family dwindles on the way: Grampa dies of a stroke and they bury him in a field; Granma dies of illness close to the California state line; and both Noah (the eldest Joad son) and Connie Rivers (the husband of the pregnant Joad daughter, Rose of Sharon) leave the family. Led by Ma, the remaining members continue on, as nothing is left for them in Oklahoma.

Reaching California, they find the state oversupplied with labor; wages are low, and workers are exploited to the point of starvation. The big corporate farmers are in collusion and smaller farmers suffer from collapsing prices. All police and state law enforcement authorities are allied with the growers. At the first migrant Hooverville camp the Joads stop at, Casy is arrested for knocking down a deputy sheriff who is about to shoot a fleeing worker for alerting others that the labor recruiter, travelling with the officer, will not pay the wages he is promising. Weedpatch Camp, one of the clean, utility-supplied camps operated by the Resettlement Administration, a New Deal agency, offers better conditions but does not have enough resources to care for all the needy families, and it does not provide work or food. Nonetheless, as a federal facility, the camp protects the migrants from harassment by local deputies.

How can you frighten a man whose hunger is not only in his own cramped stomach but in the wretched bellies of his children? You can't scare him – he has known a fear beyond every other.

— Chapter 19

In response to the exploitation, Casy becomes a labor organizer and tries to recruit for a labor union. The Joads find work as strikebreakers in a peach orchard. After picking for most of the day, they are only paid enough to buy food for that night's supper and some for the next day. One night, Tom meets Casy, who is confronted by two deputies who want to punish him for inciting a strike. When Tom witnesses Casy being struck and killed with a pickaxe, he kills one attacker and is injured by the other before fleeing. The next morning the peach plantation announces that the pay rate for the picked fruit has been reduced by half. The Joads quietly leave the orchard to work at a cotton farm while Tom hides in the nearby woods, still risking being arrested, and possibly lynched, for the homicide.

After Ruthie taunts that her brother has killed two men, Tom, knowing he must leave to avoid capture, bids his mother farewell and vows to work for the oppressed. The family continues to pick cotton and pool their daily wages to buy food. Upon its birth, Rose of Sharon's baby is stillborn. Ma Joad remains steadfast and forces the family through the bereavement. With the winter rains, the Joads' dwelling is flooded and the car disabled, and they move to higher ground.

The family takes shelter from the flood in an old barn. Inside they find a young boy and his father, who is dying of starvation. Ma realizes there is only one way to save the man. She looks at Rose of Sharon and a silent understanding passes between them. Rose of Sharon, left alone with the man, goes to him and has him drink her breast milk.

=== Interchapters ===
Throughout the novel, short vignettes or "interchapters" describe the wider setting of the story. In one of these, a land turtle attempts to cross a dusty road. The turtle is not directly related to the overall story of the Joad family, but is generally symbolic of the slow persistence of the Joads and the Okies and others during the Dust Bowl and Great Depression years.

It is in one of the interchapters that the novel's title is used in the text.

== Characters ==
- Tom Joad: the protagonist of the story; the Joad family's second son, named after his father. Later, Tom takes leadership of the family, even though he is young.
- Ma Joad: the Joad family matriarch. Practical but warm-spirited, she tries to hold the family together. Her given name is never learned; it is suggested that her maiden name was Hazlett.
- Pa Joad: the Joad family patriarch, also named Tom, age 50. Hardworking sharecropper and family man. Pa becomes a broken man upon losing his livelihood and means of supporting his family, forcing Ma to assume leadership.
- Uncle John: Pa Joad's older brother (Tom describes him as "a fella about 60", but in narrative he is described as 50). He feels guilty about the death of his young wife years before, and is prone to binges involving alcohol and prostitutes, but is generous with his goods.
- Jim Casy: a former preacher who lost his faith and later is murdered by a camp guard. He is a Christ-like figure, based on Steinbeck's friend Ed Ricketts.
- Al Joad: the third youngest Joad son, a "smart-aleck sixteen-year-older" who cares mainly for cars and girls; he looks up to Tom, but begins to find his own way.
- Rose of Sharon (said as Rosasharn) Joad Rivers: the eldest Joad daughter, a childish and dreamy teenage girl, age 18, who develops into a mature woman. Married at the beginning of the novel, her husband, Connie, abandons her while she is pregnant; she eventually delivers a stillborn baby, perhaps due to malnutrition, but she uses her breast milk to save a man from starvation.
- Connie Rivers: Rose of Sharon's husband. Nineteen years old and naïve, he is overwhelmed by marriage and impending fatherhood. He abandons his wife and the Joad family shortly after they arrive in California.
- Noah Joad: the eldest Joad son, he is the first to leave the family, near Needles, California, planning to live off fishing on the Colorado River. Injured at birth and described as "strange", it is implied he has slight learning difficulties.
- Grampa Joad: Tom's grandfather, who expresses his strong desire to stay in Oklahoma. His full name is given as "William James Joad". Grampa is drugged by his family with "soothin' syrup" to force him to leave with them for California, but he dies during the first evening on the road. Casy attributes his death to a stroke, but says that Grampa is "just' staying' with the lan'. He couldn' leave it."
- Granma Joad: Grampa's religious wife; she loses her will to live after his death. She dies while the family is crossing the Mojave Desert.
- Ruthie Joad: the youngest Joad daughter, age 12. She is shown to be reckless and childish. While quarreling with another child, she reveals that Tom is in hiding.
- Winfield Joad: the youngest Joad son, age 10. He is "kid-wild and calfish".
- Jim Rawley: He manages the camp at Weedpatch and shows the Joads surprising favor.
- Muley Graves: a neighbour of the Joads. He is invited to come along to California with them, but refuses. The family leave two of their dogs with him; a third they take, but it is killed by a car during their travels.
- Ivy and Sairy Wilson: a migrant couple from Kansas who attend the death of Grampa and share the journey as far as the California state line.
- Mr. Wainwright: a fellow laborer on the cotton farm in California; he is married to Mrs. Wainwright.
- Mrs. Wainwright: mother to Aggie and wife to Mr. Wainwright. She helps Ma deliver Rose of Sharon's baby.
- Aggie Wainwright: the sixteen-year-old daughter of Mr. and Mrs. Wainwright. Late in the novel, she and Al Joad announce their intent to marry.
- Floyd Knowles: a man at the Hooverville, where the Joads first stay in California, who urges Tom and Casy to join labor organizations. His agitation results in Casy being jailed.

== Religious interpretation ==
Many scholars have noted Steinbeck's use of Christian imagery within The Grapes of Wrath. The largest implications lie with Tom Joad and Jim Casy, who are both interpreted as Christ-like figures at certain intervals within the novel. These two are often interpreted together, with Casy representing Jesus Christ in the early days of his ministry, up until his death, which is interpreted as representing the death of Christ. From there, Tom takes over, rising in Casy's place as the Christ figure risen from the dead.

However, the religious imagery is not limited to these two characters. Scholars have regularly inspected other characters and plot points within the novel, including Ma Joad, Rose of Sharon, her stillborn child, and Uncle John. In an article first published in 2009, Ken Eckert even compared the migrants' movement west as a reversed version of the slaves' escape from Egypt in Exodus. Many of these extreme interpretations are brought on by Steinbeck's own documented beliefs, which Eckert himself refers to as "unorthodox".

To expand upon previous remarks in a journal, Leonard A. Slade lays out the chapters and how they represent each part of the slaves escaping from Egypt. Slade states “Chapters 1 through 10 correspond to bondage in Egypt (where the bank and land companies fulfill the role of Pharaoh), and the plagues (drought and erosion); chapters 11 through 18 to the Exodus and journey through the wilderness (during which the old people die off); and chapter 19 through 30 to the settlement in the Promised Land-California, whose inhabitants are hostile… formulate ethical codes (in the government camps)”.

Another religious interpretation that Slade brings up in his writings is the title itself, stating “The title of the novel, of course refers to the line: He is trampling out the vintage where the grapes of wrath are stored in Julia Ward Howe’s famous Battle Hymn of the Republic. Apparently, then the title suggests, moreover, 'that story exists in Christian context, indicating that we should expect to find some Christian meaning'." These two interpretations by Slade and other scholars show how many religious aspects can be interpreted from the book. Along with Slade, other scholars find interpretations in the characters of Rose of Sharon and her stillborn child.

== Development ==
The Grapes of Wrath developed from The Harvest Gypsies, a series of seven articles that ran in the San Francisco News, from October 5 to 12, 1936. The newspaper commissioned that work on migrant workers from the Midwest in California's agriculture industry. (It was later compiled and published separately.)

This is the beginning—from "I" to "we". If you who own the things people must have could understand this, you might preserve yourself. If you could separate causes from results, if you could know that Paine, Marx, Jefferson, Lenin were results, not causes, you might survive. But that you cannot know. For the quality of owning freezes you forever into "I", and cuts you off forever from the "we".

— Chapter 14

Steinbeck was known to have borrowed from field notes taken during 1938 by Farm Security Administration worker and author Sanora Babb. While she collected personal stories about the lives of the displaced migrants for a novel she was developing, her supervisor, Tom Collins, shared her reports with Steinbeck, who at the time was working for the San Francisco News. Babb's own novel, Whose Names Are Unknown, was eclipsed in 1939 by the success of The Grapes of Wrath and was shelved until it was finally published in 2004, a year before Babb's death.

In mid-January 1939, three months before the publication of The Grapes of Wrath, Steinbeck wrote a long letter to Pascal Covici, his editor at Viking Press. He wanted Covici, in particular, to understand this book, to appreciate what he was up to. And so he concluded with a statement that might serve as preface in and of itself: "Throughout I've tried to make the reader participate in the actuality, what he takes from it will be scaled on his own depth and shallowness. There are five layers in this book, a reader will find as many as he can and he won't find more than he has in himself."

=== Title ===
While writing the novel at his home, 16250 Greenwood Lane, in what is now Monte Sereno, California, Steinbeck had unusual difficulty devising a title. The Grapes of Wrath, suggested by his wife Carol Steinbeck, was deemed more suitable than anything by the author. The title is a reference to lyrics from "The Battle Hymn of the Republic", by Julia Ward Howe (emphasis added):

Mine eyes have seen the glory of the coming of the Lord:
He is trampling out the vintage where the grapes of wrath are stored;
He hath loosed the fateful lightning of His terrible swift sword:
His truth is marching on.

These lyrics refer, in turn, to the biblical passage Revelation 14:19–20, an apocalyptic appeal to divine justice and deliverance from oppression in the final judgment. This and other biblical passages had inspired a long tradition of imagery of Christ in the winepress, in various media. The passage reads:

And the angel thrust in his sickle into the earth, and gathered the vine of the earth, and cast it into the great winepress of the wrath of God. And the winepress was trodden without the city, and blood came out of the winepress, even unto the horse bridles, by the space of a thousand and six hundred furlongs.

The phrase also appears at the end of Chapter 25 in Steinbeck's book, which describes the purposeful destruction of food to keep the price high:

[A]nd in the eyes of the hungry there is a growing wrath. In the souls of the people the grapes of wrath are filling and growing heavy, growing heavy for the vintage.

The image invoked by the title serves as a crucial symbol in the development of both the plot and the novel's greater thematic concerns: from the terrible winepress of Dust Bowl oppression will come terrible wrath but also the deliverance of workers through their cooperation. This is suggested but not realized within the novel.

== Author's note ==
When preparing to write the novel, Steinbeck wrote: "I want to put a tag of shame on the greedy bastards who are responsible for this [the Great Depression and its effects]." He famously said, "I've done my damnedest to rip a reader's nerves to rags." His work won a large following among the working class, due to his sympathy for the migrants and workers' movement, and his accessible prose style.

== Critical reception ==
Steinbeck scholar John Timmerman sums up the book's influence: "The Grapes of Wrath may well be the most thoroughly discussed novel – in criticism, reviews, and college classrooms – of 20th century American literature." The Grapes of Wrath is referred to as a Great American Novel.

At the time of publication, Steinbeck's novel "was a phenomenon on the scale of a national event. It was publicly banned and burned by citizens, it was debated on national radio; but above all, it was read". According to The New York Times, it was the best-selling book of 1939 and 430,000 copies had been printed by February 1940. In that same month, it won the National Book Award, favorite fiction book of 1939, voted by members of the American Booksellers Association. Soon, it won the Pulitzer Prize for Fiction, and its Armed Services Edition went through two printings.

The book was noted for Steinbeck's passionate depiction of the plight of the poor, and many of his contemporaries attacked his social and political views. Bryan Cordyack wrote: "Steinbeck was attacked as a propagandist and a socialist from both the left and the right of the political spectrum. The most fervent of these attacks came from the Associated Farmers of California; they were displeased with the book's depiction of California farmers' attitudes and conduct toward the migrants. They denounced the book as a 'pack of lies' and labeled it 'communist propaganda'". Some argued that his novel was filled with inaccuracies. In his book The Art of Fiction (1984), John Gardner criticized Steinbeck for not knowing anything about the California ranchers: "Witness Steinbeck's failure in The Grapes of Wrath. It should have been one of America's great books...[S]teinbeck wrote not a great and firm novel but a disappointing melodrama in which complex good is pitted against unmitigated, unbelievable evil." Others accused Steinbeck of exaggerating camp conditions to make a political point. He had visited the camps well before publication of the novel and argued their inhumane nature destroyed the settlers' spirit.

Writing in 2019, published author and journalist Patrick Reardon questioned whether The Grapes of Wrath was great literature. He concluded that while it had raised awareness of the difficulties of the times, "Steinbeck was seeking to manipulate his readers" and the book could be considered "a fable...[which]...is cultural propaganda".

In 1962, the Nobel Prize committee cited The Grapes of Wrath as a "great work" and as one of the committee's main reasons for granting Steinbeck the Nobel Prize for Literature.

In 1999, French newspaper Le Monde of Paris ranked The Grapes of Wrath as seventh on its list of the 100 best books of the 20th century. In the UK, it was listed at number 29 among the "nation's best loved novels" on the BBC's 2003 survey The Big Read. In 2005, Time magazine included the novel in its "100 Best English-language Novels from 1923 to 2005". In 2009, The Daily Telegraph of the United Kingdom included the novel in its "100 novels everyone should read". In 2026 The Guardian newspaper polled more than 170 novelists, critics and academics and asked them to list their greatest novels of all time. The result was featured on 16th May 2026 as the 100 Best Novels (published in English). The Grapes of Wrath did not make the Top 100. Contributors included Stephen King, Salman Rushdie, Anne Enright, Yiyun Li, Ian McEwan, and Siri Hustvedt.

The Grapes of Wrath has faced a great amount of controversy since publication, including book bans and other challenges on a variety of political and religious grounds in the United States and other countries. The early attempts to suppress and censor the book directly inspired the promulgation of the Library Bill of Rights by the American Library Association.

== Commercial reception ==
Due to its leftist themes, The Grapes of Wrath sold 300,000 copies in the Soviet Union in 1941.

== Similarities to Whose Names Are Unknown ==
Sanora Babb's Whose Names Are Unknown was written in the 1930s and published in 2004. Some scholars noted strong parallels between that work — the notes for which Steinbeck is widely believed to have examined — and The Grapes of Wrath.

Writing in The Steinbeck Review, Michael J. Meyer noted numerous "obvious similarities" between the two novels "that even a cursory reading will reveal", such as Babb's account of two still-born babies, mirrored in Steinbeck's description of Rose of Sharon's baby. Among other scenes and themes repeated in both books: the villainy of banks, corporations, and company stores that charge exorbitant prices; the rejection of religion and the embrace of music as a means of preserving hope; descriptions of the fecundity of nature and agriculture, and the contrast with the impoverishment of the migrants; and the disparity between those willing to extend assistance to the migrants and others who view "Okies" as subhuman. Meyer, a Steinbeck bibliographer, stops short of labeling these parallels as plagiarism but concludes that "Steinbeck scholars would do well to read Babb — if only to see for themselves the echoes of Grapes that abound in her prose."

Steinbeck scholar David M. Wrobel wrote that "the John Steinbeck/Sanora Babb story sounds like a classic smash-and-grab: celebrated California author steals the material of unknown Oklahoma writer, resulting in his financial success and her failure to get her work published ... Steinbeck absorbed field information from many sources, primarily Tom Collins and Eric H. Thomsen, regional director of the federal migrant camp program in California, who accompanied Steinbeck on missions of mercy...if Steinbeck read Babb’s extensive notes as carefully as he did the reports of Collins, he would certainly have found them useful. His interaction with Collins and Thomsen — and their influence on the writing of The Grapes of Wrath — is documented because Steinbeck acknowledged both. Sanora Babb went unmentioned."

Writing in Broad Street (magazine), Carla Dominguez described Babb as "devastated and bitter" that Random House cancelled publication of her own novel after The Grapes of Wrath was released in 1939. It is clear, she wrote, that "Babb's retellings, interactions, and reflections were secretly read over and appropriated by Steinbeck. Babb met Steinbeck briefly and by chance at a lunch counter, but she never thought that he had been reading her notes because he did not mention it." When Babb's novel was finally published in 2004, she declared that she was a better writer than Steinbeck. "His book", Babb said, "is not as realistic as mine."

== Adaptations ==
=== In film ===
The book was quickly made into a famed 1940 Hollywood movie of the same name directed by John Ford and starring Henry Fonda as Tom Joad. The first part of the film version follows the book fairly accurately. However, the second half and the ending, in particular, differ significantly from the book. John Springer, author of The Fondas (Citadel, 1973), said of Henry Fonda and his role in The Grapes of Wrath: "The Great American Novel made one of the few enduring Great American Motion Pictures."

The documentary American: The Bill Hicks Story (2009) revealed that The Grapes of Wrath was the favorite novel of comedian Bill Hicks. He based his famous last words on Tom Joad's final speech: "I left in love, in laughter, and in truth, and wherever truth, love and laughter abide, I am there in spirit."

In July 2013, Steven Spielberg announced his plans to direct a remake of The Grapes of Wrath for DreamWorks.

In April 2025, AMC announced plans to adapt The Grapes of Wrath for television as part of its new "Great American Stories" anthology; the adaptation and franchise is being overseen by Rolin Jones.

=== In music ===
Woody Guthrie's two-part song—"Tom Joad – Parts 1 & 2" – from the album Dust Bowl Ballads (1940), explores the protagonist's life after being paroled from prison. It was covered in 1988 by Andy Irvine, who recorded both parts as a single song—"Tom Joad"—on Patrick Street's second album, No. 2 Patrick Street.

The 1981 song "Here Comes that Rainbow Again", by Kris Kristofferson, is based on the scene in the roadside diner where a man buys a loaf of bread and two candy sticks for his sons.

The band The Mission UK included a song titled "The Grapes of Wrath" on their album Carved in Sand (1990).

The progressive rock band Camel released an album, titled Dust and Dreams (1991), inspired by the novel.

American rock singer-songwriter Bruce Springsteen named his 11th studio album, The Ghost of Tom Joad (1995), after the character; and the first track on the album shares the same title. The song – and to a lesser extent, the others on the album – draws comparisons between the Dust Bowl and modern times.

Rage Against the Machine recorded a version of "The Ghost of Tom Joad" in 1997.

Like Andy Irvine in 1988, Dick Gaughan recorded Woody Guthrie's "Tom Joad" on his album Outlaws & Dreamers (2001).

An opera based on the novel was co-produced by the Minnesota Opera, and Utah Symphony and Opera, with music by Ricky Ian Gordon and libretto by Michael Korie. The opera made its world premiere in February 2007, to favorable local reviews.

Bad Religion have a song entitled "Grains of Wrath" on their album New Maps of Hell (2007). Bad Religion lead vocalist Greg Graffin is a fan of Steinbeck's work.

The song "Dust Bowl Dance", on the Mumford & Sons album Sigh No More (2009), is based on the novel.

The Pink Floyd song "Sorrow", written by front-man David Gilmour and included on the band's album A Momentary Lapse of Reason, is thematically derived from/based on the novel.

The song "No Good Al Joad", on the Hop Along album "Get Disowned" takes its title from the novel's character Al Joad.

The song "Grapes Of Wrath" by Weezer, written by Rivers Cuomo from their album "OK Human" (2021), takes its title directly from the novel.

=== In theatre ===
The Steppenwolf Theatre Company produced a stage version of the book, adapted by Frank Galati. Gary Sinise played Tom Joad for its entire run of 188 performances on Broadway in 1990. One of these performances was filmed and shown on PBS the following year.

In 1990, the Illegitimate Players theater company in Chicago produced Of Grapes and Nuts, an original, satirical mash-up of The Grapes of Wrath and Steinbeck's acclaimed novella Of Mice and Men.

In 2019, the Oregon Shakespeare Festival in Ashland, Oregon produced Mother Road by Octavio Solis, inspired by Steinbeck's The Grapes of Wrath. The play is about William Joad who believes that he has no blood kin to inherit the family farm until he finds an unexpected relation: Martín Jodes—a young Mexican-American man descended from Steinbeck's original protagonist Tom Joad. The play reverses the Joads’ mythic journey, as these modern-day Joads travel from migrant farm-worker camps in California back to Oklahoma.

== See also ==
- The Jungle
- Le Monde's 100 Books of the Century

== Bibliography ==
- Garcia, Reloy. "The Rocky Road to Eldorado: The Journey Motif in John Steinbeck's The Grapes of Wrath." Steinbeck Quarterly 14.03-04 (Summer/Fall 1981): Archived October 7, 2023, at the Wayback Machine 83-93
- Gregory, James N. "Dust Bowl Legacies: the Okie Impact on California, 1939–1989". California History 1989 68(3): 74–85. ISSN 0162-2897
- Henkel, Scott. "A Seditious Proposal." The Grapes of Wrath: A Reconsideration' Vol. 1. Ed. Michael J. Meyer. Amsterdam: Rodopi, 2009. 219–42.
- Saxton, Alexander. "In Dubious Battle: Looking Backward". Pacific Historical Review 2004 73(2): 249–262. ISSN 0030-8684 Fulltext: online at Swetswise, Ingenta, Ebsco
- Sobchack, Vivian C. "The Grapes of Wrath (1940): Thematic Emphasis through Visual Style". American Quarterly 1979 31(5): 596–615. ISSN 0003-0678 Fulltext: in Jstor. Discusses the visual style of John Ford's cinematic adaptation of the novel. Usually the movie is examined in terms of its literary roots or its social protest. But the imagery of the film reveals the important theme of the Joad family's coherence. The movie shows the family in closeups, cramped in small spaces on a cluttered screen, isolated from the land and their surroundings. Dim lighting helps abstract the Joad family from the reality of Dust Bowl migrants. The film's emotional and aesthetic power comes from its generalized quality attained through this visual style.
- Windschuttle, Keith. "Steinbeck's Myth of the Okies". Archived November 9, 2013, at the Wayback Machine The New Criterion, Vol. 20, No. 10, June 2002.
- Zirakzadeh, Cyrus Ernesto. "John Steinbeck on the Political Capacities of Everyday Folk: Moms, Reds, and Ma Joad's Revolt". Polity 2004 36(4): 595–618. ISSN 0032-3497
- Gardner, John (1991) [1984]. The Art of Fiction: Notes on Craft for Young Writers (Vintage Books ed.). Vintage Books. ISBN 0-679-73403-1.
