= Sanora Babb =

Αmerican writer (1907–2005)

- Born: Sanora Louise Babb; April 21, 1907; Leavenworth, Kansas, U.S.
- Died: December 31, 2005 (aged 98); Los Angeles, California, U.S.
- Education: University of Kansas; Garden City Community College
- Occupations: Novelist; editor; poet
- Spouse(s): James Wong Howe (m. 1937; died 1976) (marriage not recognized in California until 1948)
- Writing career
- Pen name: Sylvester Davis
- Notable works: An Owl on Every Post; Whose Names Are Unknown

Sanora Louise Babb (April 21, 1907 – December 31, 2005) was an American novelist, poet, and literary editor known for her realistic portrayal of life during the Great Depression era. Eight of her books, including novels, a memoir, short story collections, and a volume of poetry, were published. After her death, she was featured in the Ken Burns 2012 documentary The Dust Bowl.

Her best known work, Whose Names Are Unknown (2004), received much critical acclaim and was a finalist for the 2005 Spur Award for the Best Western Novel and the 2005 PEN Center USA Literary Award for fiction. The novel had been written decades prior; John Steinbeck's 1939 Pulitzer Prize-winning novel The Grapes of Wrath had been based on Babb's field notes from interviews of migrant camp families compiled for her own book. Her boss, camp manager Tom Collins, had asked her to provide a copy of her notes to Steinbeck, who dedicated his novel to his wife and to Collins, "who lived it," with no attribution to Babb, whose own work was submitted to her publisher shortly thereafter.

Her short stories and poems have also won recognition. Her short stories "Wildflower" and "Santa Ana" were included in The Best American Short Stories (1950 and 1960 editions) edited by Martha Foley. Her poetry collection, Told in the Seed, won the Borestone Mountain Poetry Award in 1967 and her poem "Captive" from the Mitre Press Anthology, London won the Gold Medal Award in 1932. Babb's writing focuses on the themes of marginalized people and their connection to nature during the Great Depression. Her other works include The Lost Traveler (1958), An Owl on Every Post (1970), The Dark Earth and Other Stories (1987), Cry of Tinamou (1997), Told in the Seed (1998), On the Dirty Plate Trail (2007), and The Dark Earth and Selected Prose from the Great Depression (2021).

== Early life ==
Sanora Louise Babb was born in Leavenworth, Kansas, the elder daughter of Walter L. and Anna Jeanette "Jennie" (née Parks; later Kempner) Babb, while her father was living in what is now Red Rock, Oklahoma. While neither of her parents belonged to the Otoe tribe, living in a Native American community gave Babb a heightened sensitivity to the relationship between the land and its people. Her father was a professional gambler who moved his family frequently. After betting on a future in dry-land farming, Walter moved his wife, Sanora, and her younger sister Dorothy to a one-room dugout on a broomcorn farm settled by her grandfather, Alonzo Babb, near Lamar, Colorado.

Babb wrote about her experiences from this time period in her life in her The Lost Traveler (1958), an autobiographical novel that depicts a rambling gambling father from his daughter's perspective as she comes of age in the Great Depression and in An Owl on Every Post (1970), a memoir that tells Babb's story of homesteading in the Great Plains from the time she was seven years old. The town in An Owl on Every Post is Two Buttes, in Baca County, to the south of Lamar which is in Prowers County.

After four unsuccessful years in farming, her father moved the family to Elkhart, Kansas and then to Forgan, Oklahoma in the Oklahoma Panhandle. Babb began attending school at eleven. She graduated from high school as the Valedictorian. Afterwards, her father moved the family again to Kansas. She began studying at the University of Kansas but after one year, her lack of financial resources forced her to transfer to a junior college in Garden City, Kansas.

== Career ==
Babb's volunteer work brought her alongside migrant farming communities. This volunteer work with the Farm Security Administration would greatly influence her novel Whose Names Are Unknown.

Babb began working as a printer's assistant at 12 years old. Following this, she worked as a schoolteacher for a short time, before beginning her journalism career at the Garden City Herald, where several of her articles were redistributed by the Associated Press. She moved to Los Angeles in 1929 to work for the Los Angeles Times, but the newspaper retracted its initial offer following the U.S. stock market crash of 1929. Babb was occasionally homeless during the Depression, sleeping at times in Lafayette Park. She eventually found secretarial work with Warner Brothers and wrote scripts for radio station KFWB. Babb joined the John Reed Club and was a member of the U.S. Communist Party for eleven years. She visited the Soviet Union in 1936.

In 1938, Babb returned to California to work for the Farm Security Administration, a position that would deeply influence the composition of her novel Whose Names Are Unknown. While with the FSA, she kept detailed notes on her experiences in the tent camps with the Dust Bowl migrants. Babb's supervisor, Tom Collins, shared the notes with John Steinbeck, who had recently published several articles on migrants for the San Francisco News. Babb turned the stories she collected into Whose Names Are Unknown and sent the first few chapters to Random House. Editor Bennett Cerf gave Babb an advance for her novel asking her to finish it. Unfortunately, with the publication of Steinbeck's The Grapes of Wrath, Cerf voided Babb's contract in 1939 for fears that there would not be enough public support for two similar novels. Babb's novel Whose Names Are Unknown was not published until 2004.

In the early 1940s, Babb was the West Coast secretary of the League of American Writers. She edited the literary magazine The Clipper and its successor The California Quarterly, helping to introduce the work of Ray Bradbury and B. Traven. At the same time, she ran a Chinese restaurant in Los Angeles called Ching How, owned by her future husband James Wong Howe.^{[52]}

During the early years of the House Un-American Activities Committee (HUAC) hearings investigating Hollywood for communist influence which began in 1947, Babb was blacklisted and moved to Mexico City to protect Howe, who was "graylisted", from further harassment.

Babb resumed publishing books in 1958 with her novel The Lost Traveler, followed in 1970 by her memoir An Owl on Every Post. Babb's shelved Dust Bowl novel Whose Names Are Unknown was released by the University of Oklahoma Press in 2004.

== Personal life ==
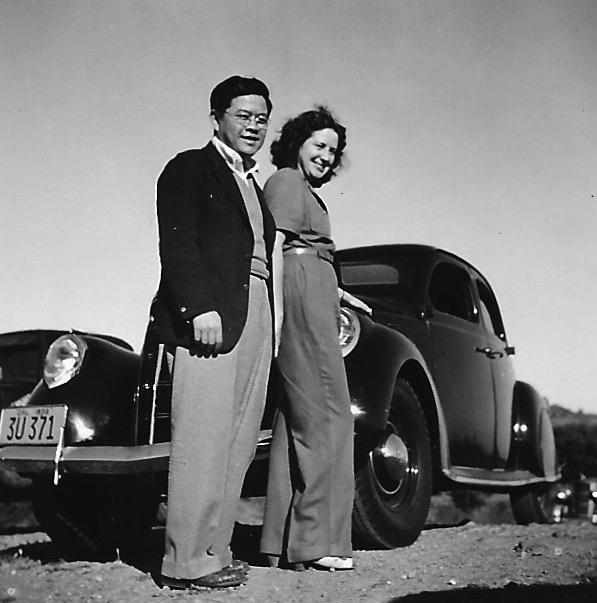
Babb with her husband James Wong Howe

Starting in 1932 Babb had a long correspondence and friendship with writer William Saroyan that grew into an unrequited love affair on Saroyan's part. She also had an affair with Ralph Ellison between 1941 and 1943.

She met the Chinese-American cinematographer James Wong Howe, and they traveled to Paris in 1937 to marry. Their marriage was not recognized in California because the state had an anti-miscegenation law that prohibited marriage between people of different races. Howe's traditional Chinese views prevented him from cohabiting with Babb while they were not legally married, so they maintained separate apartments in the same building. Furthermore, Howe's studio contract had a "morals clause" that prohibited him from publicly acknowledging their relationship.

Howe and Babb did not legally marry in California until 1948, after the court case Perez v. Sharp overturned the state marriage ban. When the couple found a judge who agreed to perform the marriage, he reportedly stated: "She looks old enough. If she wants to marry a chink, that's her business".

Babb's political connections indicate a leftward, progressive lean. Mish and Whisenhunt note that Babb's connections to the Communist Party, among other liberal organizations, indicate Babb was "influenced by leftist ideals". In fact, she would sever ties with the Communist Party-USA because the party was not liberal enough for her views. Babb's engagement with the John Reed Club in the 1930s connected her to other writers of the time, such as Edna St. Vincent Millay.

Babb's progressive leanings ultimately lead her to being blacklisted by the House Un-American Activities Committee. At one point, she was forced to flee the United States for Mexico. Babb returned to the U.S. in 1951 and settled in Los Angeles, California. Babb became part of the LA writing group started by Ray Bradbury and taught classes on fiction at UCLA. Babb continued to write and publish well into her eighties.

== Death and posthumous publications ==
Babb died in her Los Angeles home on December 31, 2005, at the age of 98 due to natural causes according to her editor, Joanne Dearcopp. Before her death, she was widowed by her husband, James Wong Howe, who died in 1976. She left no immediate survivors, but Joanne Dearcoppe, who knew Babb for over 60 years, was named literary executor.

Dearcopp has published additional work by Babb posthumously in addition to pursuing recovery work of Babb's writings. At the time of Babb's death, only one year had passed since Whose Names Are Unknown was published by the University of Oklahoma Press, which both The New York Times and Los Angeles Times noted in the obituaries they published.

== Reception and legacy ==
The reception for Whose Names Are Unknown has been largely positive. Scholars and reviewers have praised its realistic depiction of a family affected by The Great Depression and The Dust Bowl in addition to its role in introducing a progressive, feminist approach to a story known most famously from a male author, John Steinbeck. Despite critical acclaim, much speculation has ensued on the relationship (or lack thereof) between Babb and Steinbeck.

Babb's works are tied to many areas of contemporary literary and cultural studies, including Regional Studies, Great Plains Studies, Dust Bowl Studies, California Studies, and Rural Studies. Her works are also relevant to Working Class Studies, Migrant Literature, and Environmental/Nature Writing. Additionally, her writing has been compared to Willa Cather and Laura Ingalls Wilder.

Babb's life and work featured prominently in Ken Burns's documentary The Dust Bowl and Kristin Hannah's Four Winds was influenced by Whose Names Are Unknown and Babb's related fieldwork. Most recently, Iris Jamahl Dunkle's biography, Riding Like the Wind: The Life of Sanora Babb, seeks to recover her works, arguing that Babb's work was not only overshadowed by Steinbeck, but that her notes provided the basis for his novel.

== Whose Names Are Unknown summary ==
Babb's critical dustbowl novel, Whose Names Are Unknown, was published a year before her death after being shelved for over 60 years. The novel, which centers on the hardship and ultimate westward migration of the Dunne family, was a victim of "poor timing", as John Steinbeck's Grapes of Wrath was published concurrently. An observant narrator follows the family, consisting of father Milt, mother Julia, their two daughters Myra and Lonnie, and Milt's father, affectionately called Konkie by his granddaughters. Konkie (Old Man Dunne) was influenced Babb's real-life grandfather, Alonzo Babb. The family resides on an Oklahoman farm in a tiny dugout which is far too small for the family.

The family faces hardship, from geographical hardship related to crops and farming as well as the Dust Bowl. Further, their finances are deeply intwined in the local grocery, as well as land taxes. There is animosity between ranchers and farmers, not to mention family farmers and local banks.

At the beginning of the novel, Julia is pregnant with a son she loses. The community, even in their own dire straits, rallies to emotionally support the family. Poverty and lack of resources contribute to Julia's child loss, and the daughters continue to grow more and more frail. The family sells what they can including limited crops and Julia's treasured piano.

During the Dust Bowl, Julia chronicles the oppressive dust in diary entries. These journals reflect Babb's mother's observations of the Dust Bowl.

After a series of continued oppressive events, the family is forced to flee to California, leaving Konkie behind. In California, the family experiences more hardship, staying in migrant farm camps like those Babb had volunteered in and observed. The family is forced to work for pittance, and it is only through banding together with other migrant farm workers that they begin to exert agency.

Schooling of children features prominently in the novel. Even as the poor Oklahoma farm families struggle to survive, they are devoted to providing school access for their children. This is continued in California, although the children resist attending school, even with threat of truancy charges, due to the use of the pejorative "Okie" against migrant farmworkers and their children.

== Works ==
=== Books ===
- The Lost Traveler, 1958
- An Owl on Every Post, 1970
- Dark Earth and Other Stories from the Great Depression — printed in one volume with Lew Amster, The Killer Instinct and Other Stories from the Great Depression, Santa Barbara, CA : Capra Press, 1987, ISBN 978-0-88496-283-0
- Cry of the Tinamou, 1997, Muse Ink Press (27. Juli 2021), ISBN 978-0985991555
- Told in the Seed, 1998, Muse Ink Press (30. Juli 2021), ISBN 978-0985991548
- Whose Names Are Unknown, Norman, Oklahoma: University of Oklahoma Press, 2004, ISBN 0-8061-3579-4
- On the Dirty Plate Trail: Remembering the Dust Bowl Refugee Camps, 2007, Austin: University of Texas Press, 2007, ISBN 978-0-292-71445-8
- The Dark Earth and Selected Prose from the Great Depression, Muse Ink Press (24 Aug. 2021), ISBN 978-0985991579

=== Short stories ===
- "The Larger Cage" The Anitoch Review, vol. 13, no. 2, 1953, pp. 168–80.
- "The Tea Party" Seventeen, vol. 15, no. 3, 1956, 0p. 110, 142, 145, 175–77.
- "The Wild Flower" in The Best American Short Stories 1950, edited by Martha Foley.
- "Night of Yearning" Saturday Evening Post, vol. 232, no. 22, Nov. 1959, pp. 20106.
- "The Santa Ana" in The Best American Short Stories 1960, edited by Martha Foley.

=== Poems ===
- "Spring Wooing" Prairie Schooner, vol. 7, no. 1, 1933, p. 66.
- "Essence" Prairie Schooner, vol. 7, no. 2, 1933, p. 93.
- "Why Does the Dog Howl on the Midnight Hill?" Dalhousie Review, vol. 36, 1956, p. 58.
- "Allegro Con Fuoco" Dalhousie Review, vol. 36, 1956, p. 58.
- "The Visitor" Dalhousie Review, vol. 43, no. 2, 1963, p. 189.
- "Old Snapshots: Poem." Prairie Schooner, vol. 39, 1965, p. 302.
- "Told in the Seed" The Southern Review (Baton Rouge), vol. 2, no. 1, 1966, p. 117.
- "Night Visit" The Southern Review (Baton Rouge), vol. 17, no. 3, 1981, p. 583.
- "The Last Year" Hawaii Review, 1987, p. 20.
- "Above Malpaso Creek" Hawaii Review, vol. 12, no. 2, 1988, p. 54.
- "Night in a Greek Village" The Southern Review (Baton Rouge), vol. 26, no. 3, 1990, p. 679.
