= Dust Bowl =

1930s period of severe dust storms in North America

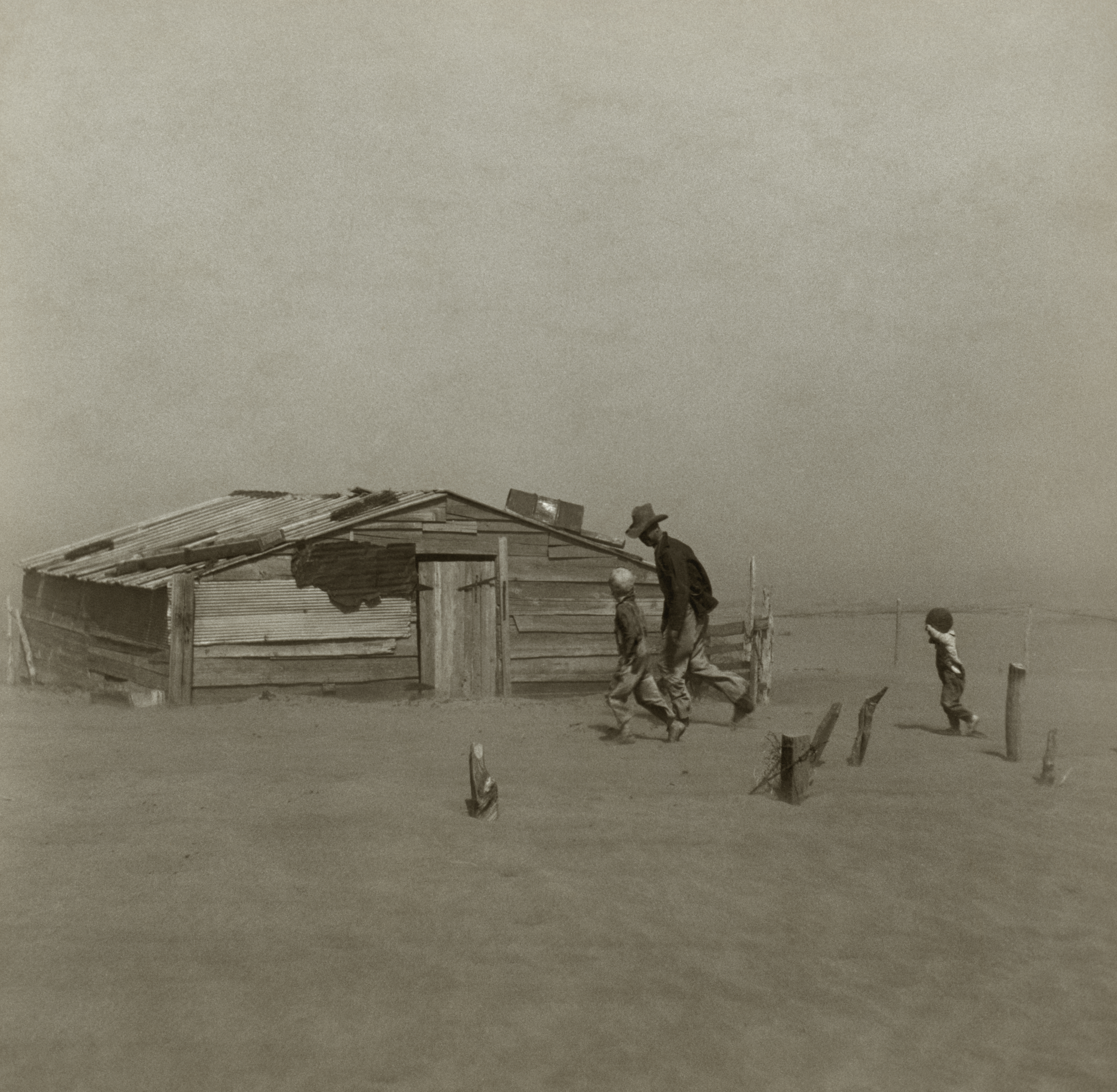
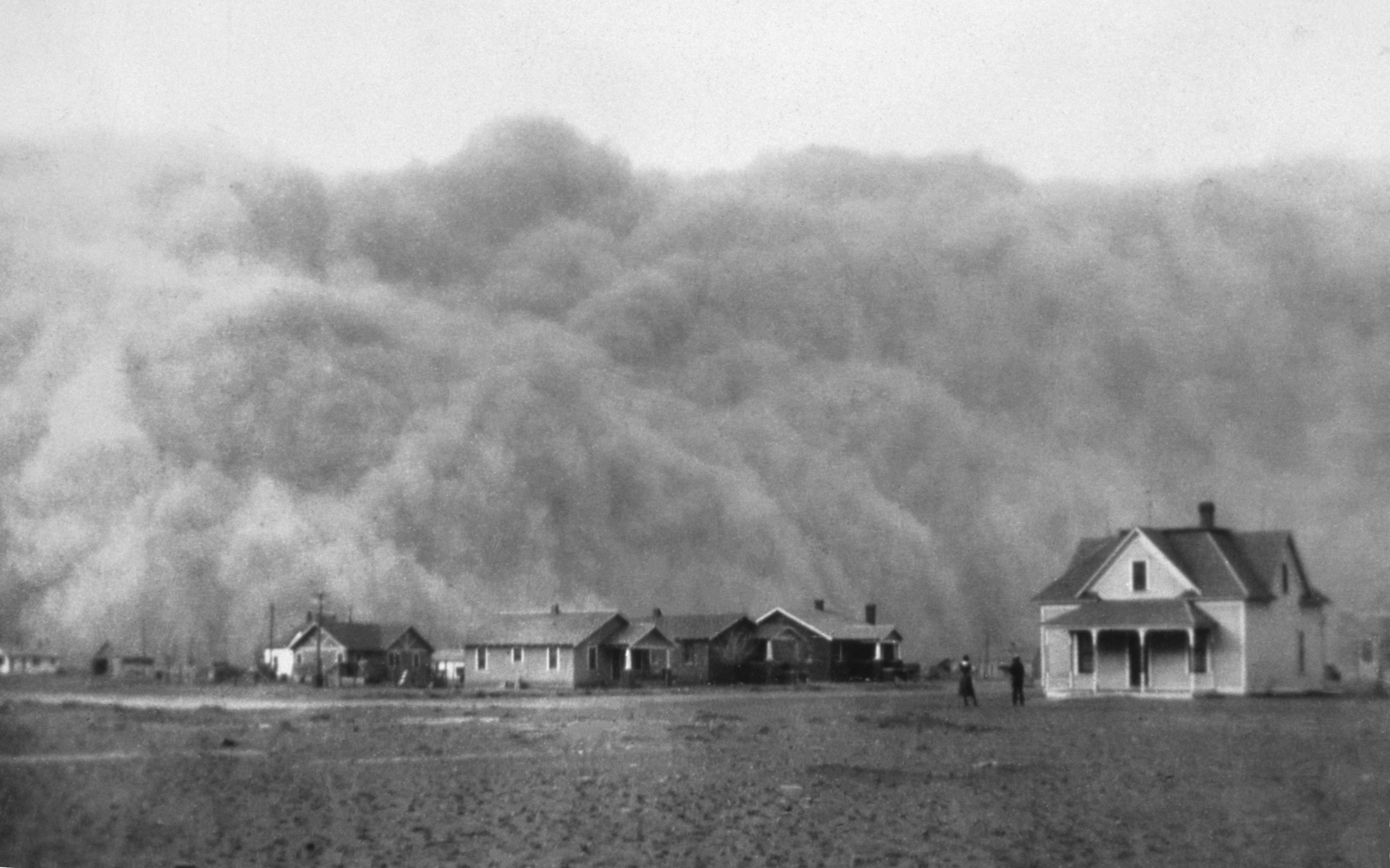
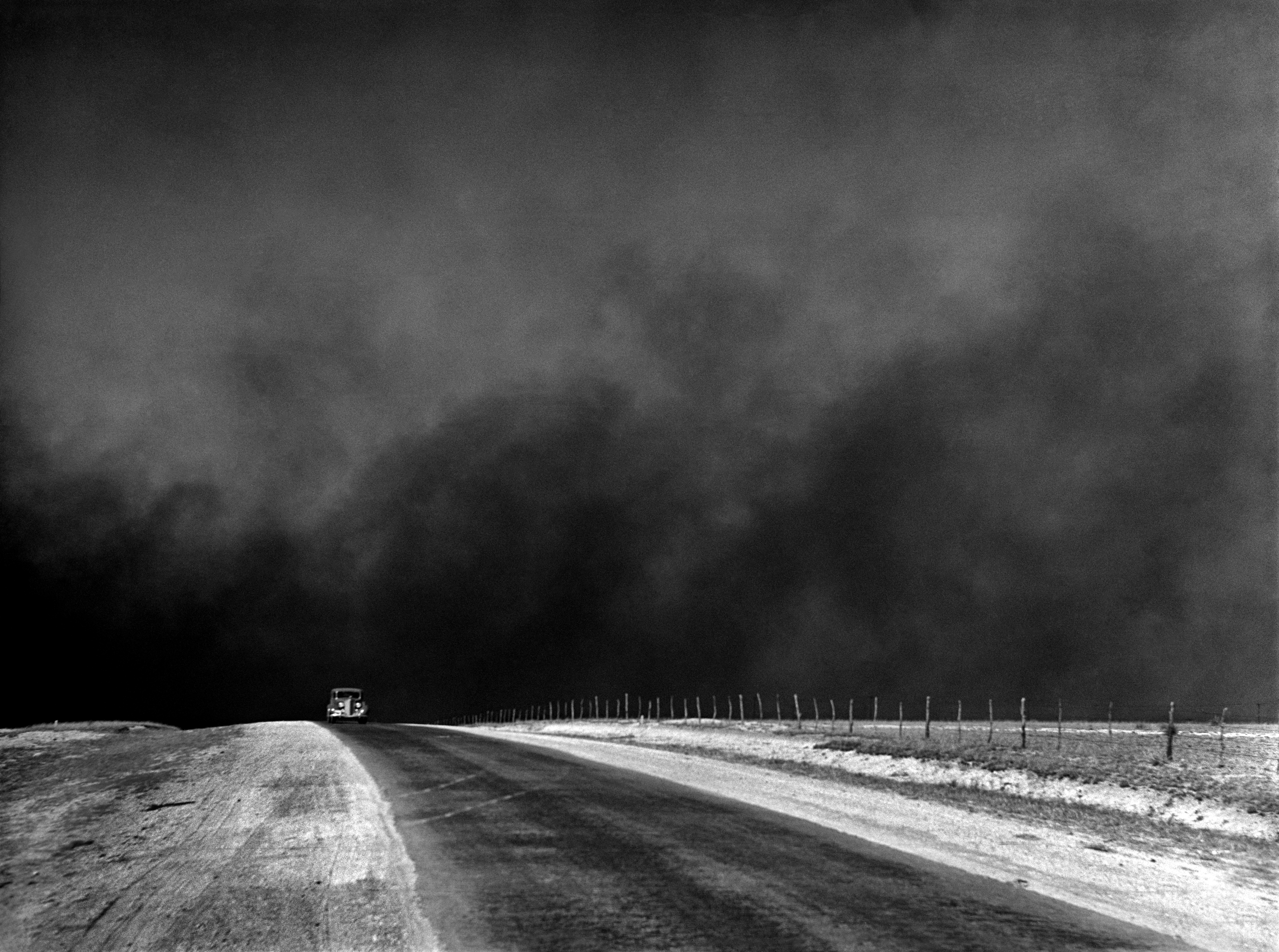
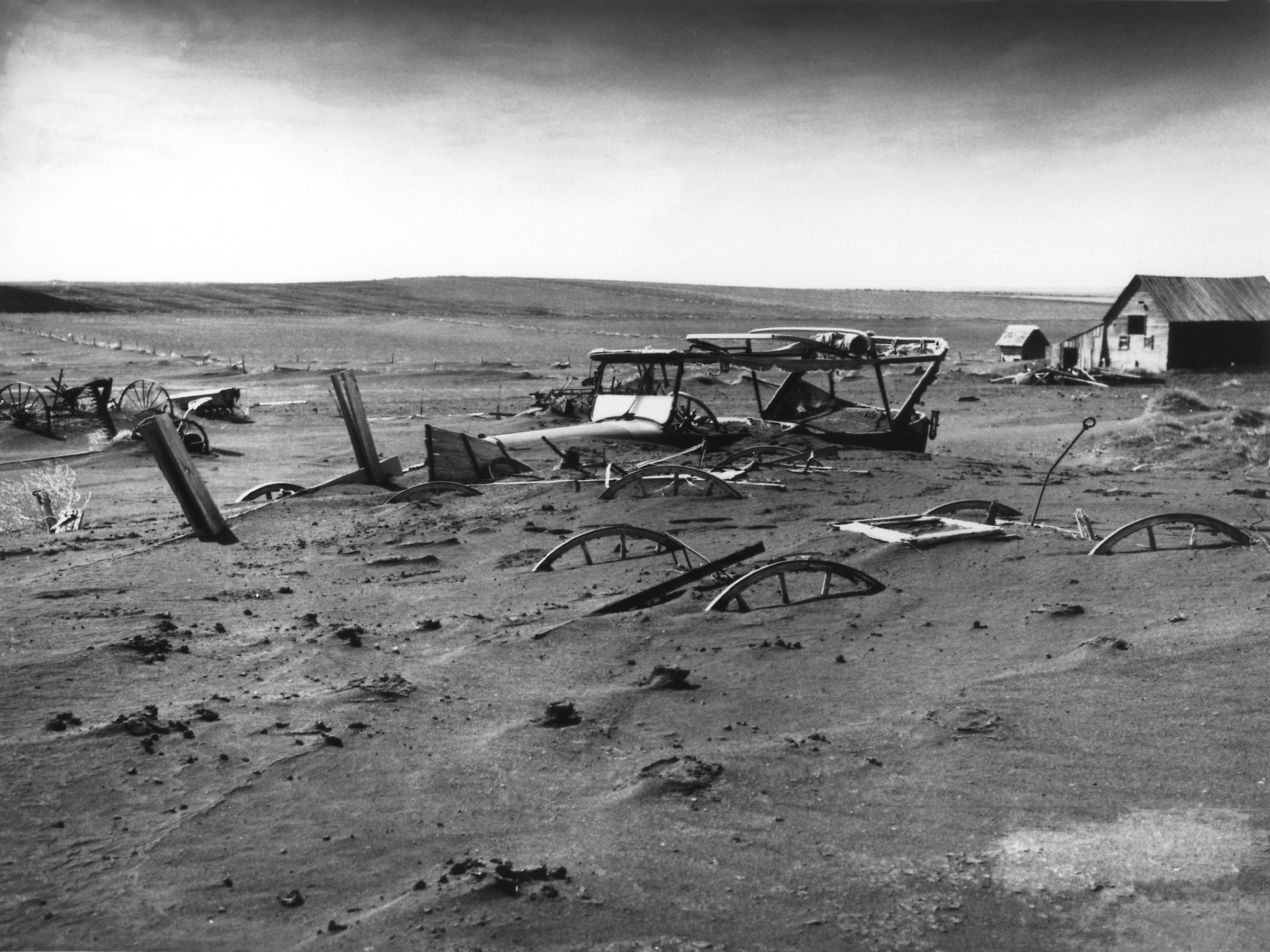
Clockwise from top:
Arthur Rothstein's Farmer and Sons Walking in the Face of a Dust Storm; A dust storm approaching Stratford, Texas, 1935; Buried barn lot machinery in Dallas, South Dakota, May 1936; Heavy black clouds of dust rising over the Texas panhandle, 1936

The Dust Bowl (1930–1940) was a period of severe dust storms and arid weather conditions that greatly damaged the agriculture and ecology of the High Plains and North American prairies. In the United States, it primarily affected farmland in western Kansas, the Oklahoma and Texas panhandles, southeast Colorado, and northeast New Mexico.

The phenomenon was caused by a combination of natural factors, including severe drought, and human behavior, including the destruction of natural topsoil by settlers who did not use dryland farming methods to prevent wind erosion. The drought came in three waves: 1934, 1936, and 1939–1940, but some regions of the High Plains experienced drought conditions for as long as eight years. It exacerbated an already existing agricultural recession.

The Dust Bowl has been the subject of many cultural works, including John Steinbeck's 1937 novel Of Mice and Men and 1939 novel The Grapes of Wrath; the Dust Bowl Ballads of Woody Guthrie; and Dorothea Lange's photographs depicting the conditions of migrants, particularly Migrant Mother, taken in 1936.

== Geographic characteristics and early history ==
The Dust Bowl area lies principally west of the 100th meridian on the High Plains, characterized by plains that vary from rolling in the north to flat in the Llano Estacado. Elevation ranges from 2,500 ft (760 m) in the east to 6,000 ft (1,800 m) at the base of the Rocky Mountains. The area is semiarid, receiving less than 20 in (510 mm) of rain annually; this rainfall supports the shortgrass prairie biome originally present in the area. The region is also prone to extended drought, alternating with unusual wetness of equivalent duration. During wet years, the rich soil provides bountiful agricultural output, but crops fail during dry years. The region is also subject to high winds. During early European and American exploration of the Great Plains, this region was thought unsuitable for European-style agriculture; explorers called it the Great American Desert. The lack of surface water and timber made the region less attractive than other areas for pioneer settlement and agriculture.

The federal government encouraged settlement and development of the Plains for agriculture via the Homestead Act of 1862, offering settlers "quarter section" 160-acre (65 ha) plots. With the end of the Civil War in 1865 and the completion of the first transcontinental railroad in 1869, waves of new migrants and immigrants reached the Great Plains and greatly increased the acreage under cultivation. An unusually wet period in the Great Plains mistakenly led settlers and the federal government to believe that "rain follows the plow" (a popular phrase among real estate promoters) and that the region's climate had permanently changed. While initial agricultural endeavors were primarily cattle ranching, the harsh winters' adverse effect on the cattle, beginning in 1886, a short drought in 1890, and general overgrazing, led many landowners to increase the amount of land under cultivation.

Recognizing the challenge of cultivating marginal arid land, the U.S. government expanded on the 160 acres (65 ha) offered under the Homestead Act, granting 640 acres (260 ha) to homesteaders in western Nebraska under the Kinkaid Act (1904) and 320 acres (130 ha) elsewhere in the Great Plains under the Enlarged Homestead Act of 1909. Waves of European settlers arrived in the plains at the beginning of the 20th century. A return of unusually wet weather seemingly confirmed a previously held opinion that the "formerly" semiarid area could support large-scale agriculture. At the same time, technological improvements such as mechanized plowing and mechanized harvesting made it possible to operate larger properties without increasing labor costs.

With insufficient understanding of the ecology of the plains, farmers had conducted extensive deep plowing of the Great Plains' virgin topsoil during the previous decade; this displaced the native, deep-rooted grasses that normally trapped soil and moisture even during periods of drought and high winds. The rapid mechanization of farm equipment, especially small gasoline tractors, and widespread use of the combine harvester contributed to farmers' decisions to convert arid grassland (much of which received no more than 10 inches (250 mm) of precipitation per year) to cultivated cropland. During the drought of the 1930s, the unanchored soil turned to dust, which prevailing winds blew away in huge clouds that sometimes blackened the sky. These choking billows of dust – named "black blizzards" or "black rollers" – traveled cross-country, reaching as far as the East Coast and striking such cities as New York City and Washington, D.C. On the plains, they often reduced visibility to three feet (1 m) or less. Associated Press reporter Robert E. Geiger happened to be in Boise City, Oklahoma, to witness the "Black Sunday" black blizzards of April 14, 1935; Edward Stanley, the Kansas City news editor of the Associated Press, coined the term "Dust Bowl" while rewriting Geiger's news story.

The term "the Dust Bowl" originally referred to the geographical area affected by the dust, but today it usually refers to the event itself (the term "Dirty Thirties" is also sometimes used). The drought and erosion of the Dust Bowl affected 100 million acres (400,000 km^{2}) that centered on the Texas Panhandle and Oklahoma Panhandle and touched adjacent sections of New Mexico, Colorado, and Kansas. The Dust Bowl forced tens of thousands of poverty-stricken families, who were unable to pay mortgages or grow crops, to abandon their farms, and losses reached $25 million per day by 1936 (equivalent to $580 million in 2025). Many of these families, often called "Okies" because many of them came from Oklahoma, migrated to California and other states to find that the Great Depression had rendered economic conditions there little better than those they had left.

The combined effects of World War I and the disruption of the Russian Revolution, which decreased the supply of wheat and other commodity crops, increased agricultural prices; this demand encouraged farmers to dramatically increase cultivation. For example, in the Llano Estacado of eastern New Mexico and northwestern Texas, the area of farmland doubled between 1900 and 1920, then tripled between 1925 and 1930. The agricultural methods farmers favored during this period created the conditions for large-scale erosion under certain environmental conditions. The widespread conversion of the land by deep plowing and other soil preparation methods to enable agriculture eliminated the native grasses that held the soil in place and helped retain moisture during dry periods. Furthermore, cotton farmers left fields bare during the winter, when winds in the High Plains are highest, and burned the stubble as a means to control weeds before planting, thereby depriving the soil of organic nutrients and surface vegetation.

== Drought and dust storms ==
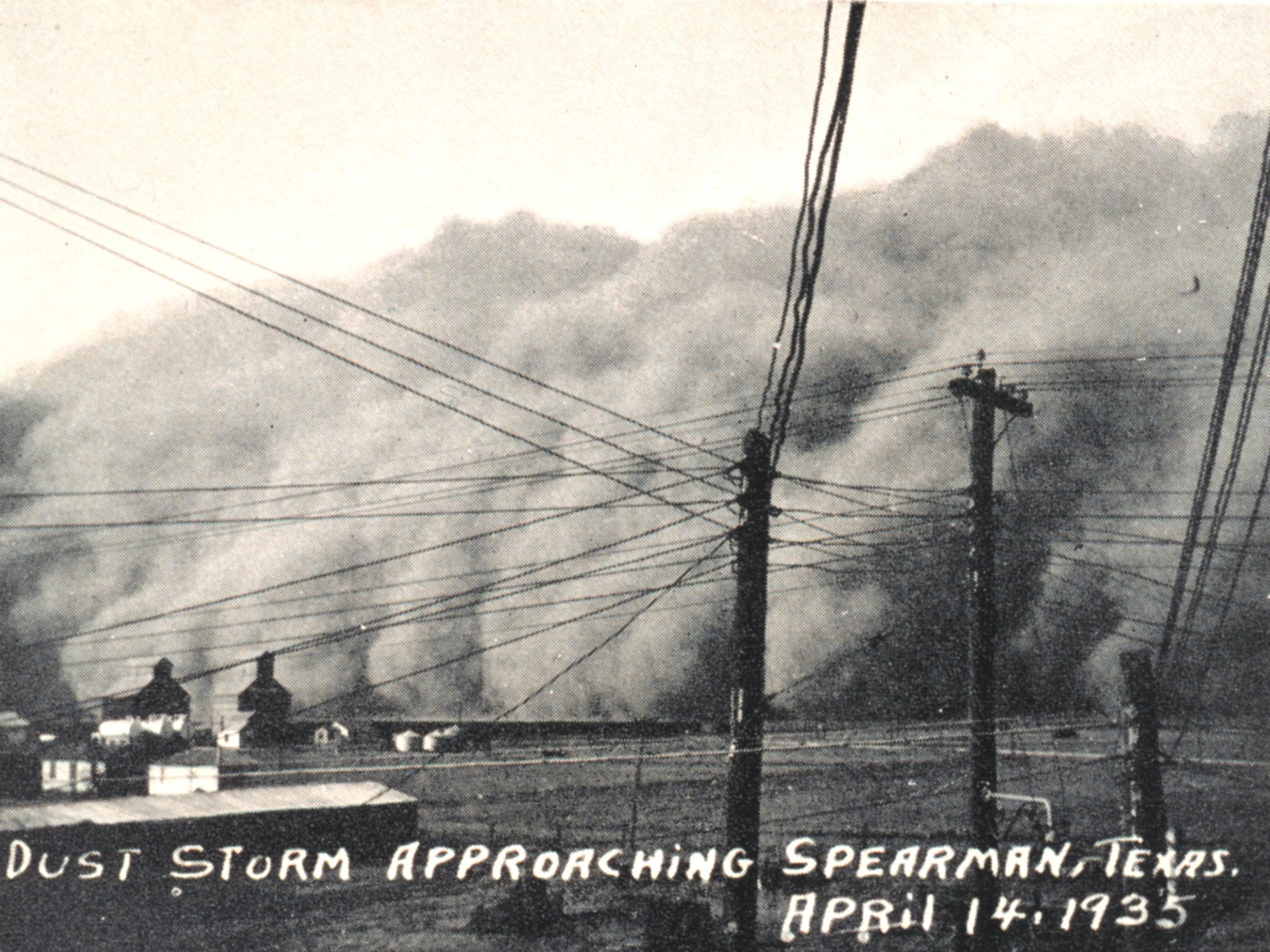
A dust storm; Spearman, Texas, April 14, 1935

Map of states and counties affected by the Dust Bowl between 1935 and 1938, originally prepared by the Soil Conservation Service. The most severely affected counties during this period are colored .

After fairly favorable climatic conditions in the 1920s with good rainfall and relatively moderate winters that permitted increased settlement and cultivation in the Great Plains, an unusually dry era began in the summer of 1930. During the next decade, the northern plains suffered four of their seven driest calendar years since 1895, Kansas suffered four of its 12 driest years, and the entire region south of West Texas suffered an extended period of below-average rainfall until 1941. When severe drought struck the Great Plains region in the 1930s, it resulted in erosion and loss of topsoil because of farming practices at the time. The drought dried the topsoil and over time it became friable, reduced to a powdery consistency in some places. Without indigenous grasses in place, the plains' high winds picked up the topsoil and created massive dust storms. The persistent dry weather caused crops to fail, leaving the plowed fields exposed to wind erosion. The Great Plains' fine soil eroded easily and was carried east by strong continental winds.

The first recorded dust storm occurred on September 14, 1930. It was seen more as a meteorological anomaly at the time as it was unlike anything else ever recorded. Unlike a sand storm, the cloud was black or gray (not beige or red) and rolled across the ground. Inside, visibility dropped to the point where people couldn't see their hands in front of their faces.

On November 11, 1933, a very strong dust storm stripped topsoil from desiccated South Dakota farmlands in one of a series of severe dust storms that year. Beginning on May 9, 1934, a strong, two-day dust storm removed massive amounts of Great Plains topsoil in one of the worst such storms of the Dust Bowl. The dust clouds blew all the way to Chicago, where they deposited 12 million pounds (5,400 tonnes) of dust. Two days later, the same storm reached cities to the east, such as Cleveland, Buffalo, Boston, New York City, and Washington, D.C. Dust worked its way into even well-sealed homes, leaving a coating on food, skin, and furniture. That winter (1934–35), red snow fell on New England.

On April 14, 1935, known as "Black Sunday", the day started out clear and warm, with temperatures in the 80s and the air completely still, causing many people to let down their guard. However, a diving cold front from Canada kicked up mountains of dust in the turbulent air in the Dakotas and plowed south across the Great Plains at 60 mph. The only sign of the advancing storm was the snapping of static electricity and the flocks of screeching birds and rabbits streaming south; unlike other such storms, the winds didn't pick up until the dust cloud's leading edge arrived.

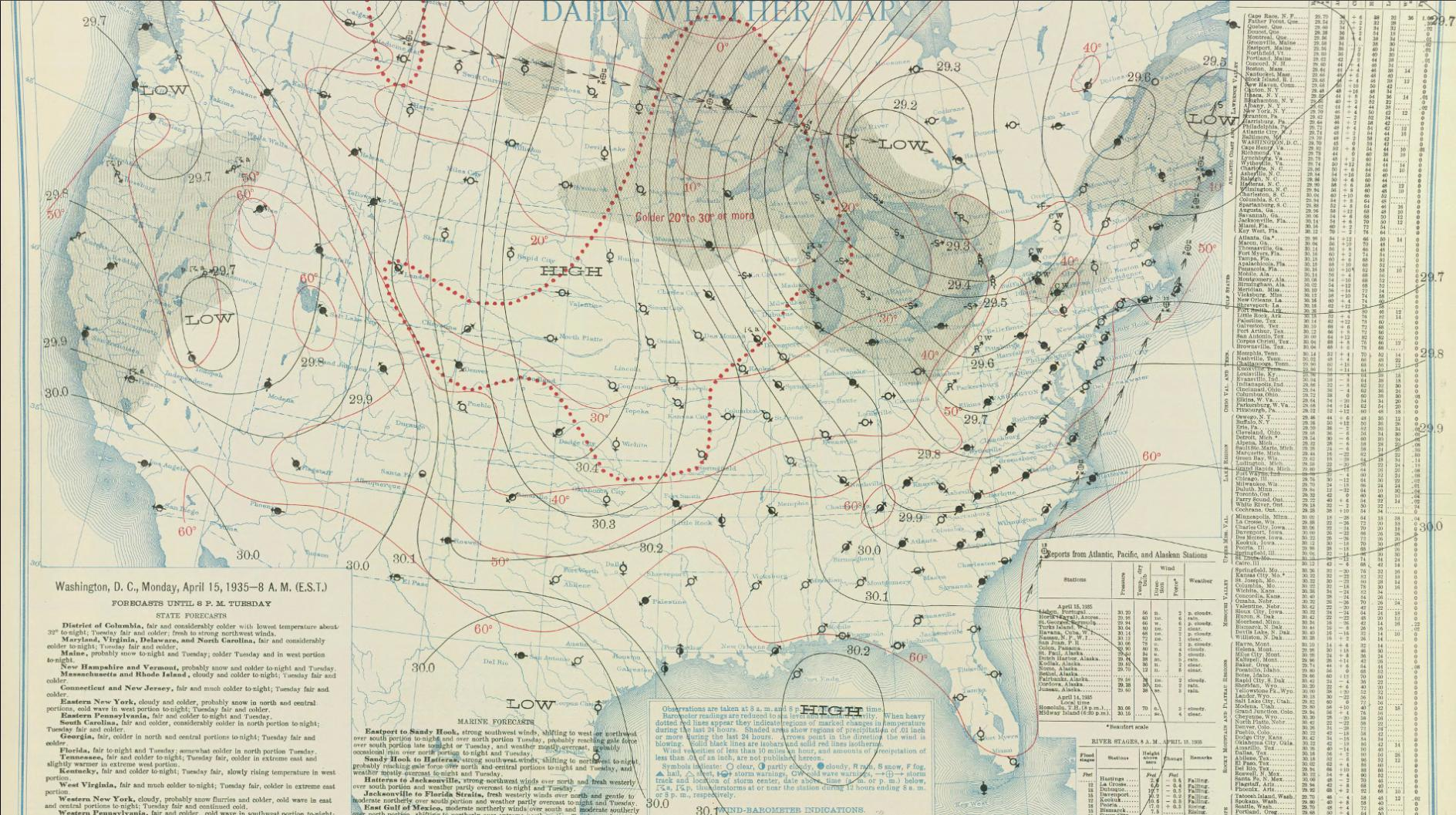
U.S. Weather Bureau Surface Analysis at 7:00 am CST on April 15, 1935, just after one of the most severe dust storms

Denver-based Associated Press reporter Robert E. Geiger had been sent to "the dust sector" on assignment. His three-part story about Black Sunday marked the first appearance of the term Dust Bowl; it was coined by Edward Stanley, Kansas City news editor of the Associated Press, while rewriting Geiger's news story.

Spearman and Hansford County have been literaly [sic] in a cloud of dust for the past week. Ever since Friday of last week, there hasn't been a day pass but what the county was beseieged [sic] with a blast of wind and dirt. On rare occasions when the wind did subside for a period of hours, the air has been so filled with dust that the town appeared to be overhung by a fog cloud. Because of this long seige of dust and every building being filled with it, the air has become stifling to breathe and many people have developed sore throats and dust colds as a result.

— Spearman Reporter, March 21, 1935

Much of the farmland in the Plains was eroded in the aftermath of the Dust Bowl. In 1941, a Kansas agricultural experiment station released a bulletin that suggested reestablishing native grasses by the "hay method". Developed in 1937 to speed up the process and increase returns from pasture, the "hay method" was originally supposed to occur in Kansas naturally over 25–40 years.

After much data analysis, the causal mechanism for the droughts can be linked to ocean temperature anomalies. Specifically, Atlantic Ocean sea surface temperatures appear to have had an indirect effect on the general atmospheric circulation, while Pacific sea surface temperatures seem to have had the most direct influence.

== Human displacement ==
In 1935, many families were forced to leave their farms. More than 350 houses had to be torn down after one storm alone. Many homesteaders suffered foreclosures on their mortgages, and others felt they had no choice but to abandon their farms in search of work. More than 500,000 Americans were left homeless.

Many Americans migrated west, looking for work. Parents packed up "jalopies" with their families and a few personal belongings and headed west. Between 1930 and 1940, about 3.5 million people moved out of the Plains states. In just over a year, over 86,000 people migrated to California. This number is more than the number of migrants to that area during the 1849 gold rush. Migrants abandoned farms in Oklahoma, Arkansas, Missouri, Iowa, Nebraska, Kansas, Texas, Colorado, and New Mexico, but were often generally called "Okies", "Arkies", or "Texies". Terms such as "Okies" and "Arkies" came to be standard in the 1930s for those who had lost everything and were struggling the most during the Great Depression.

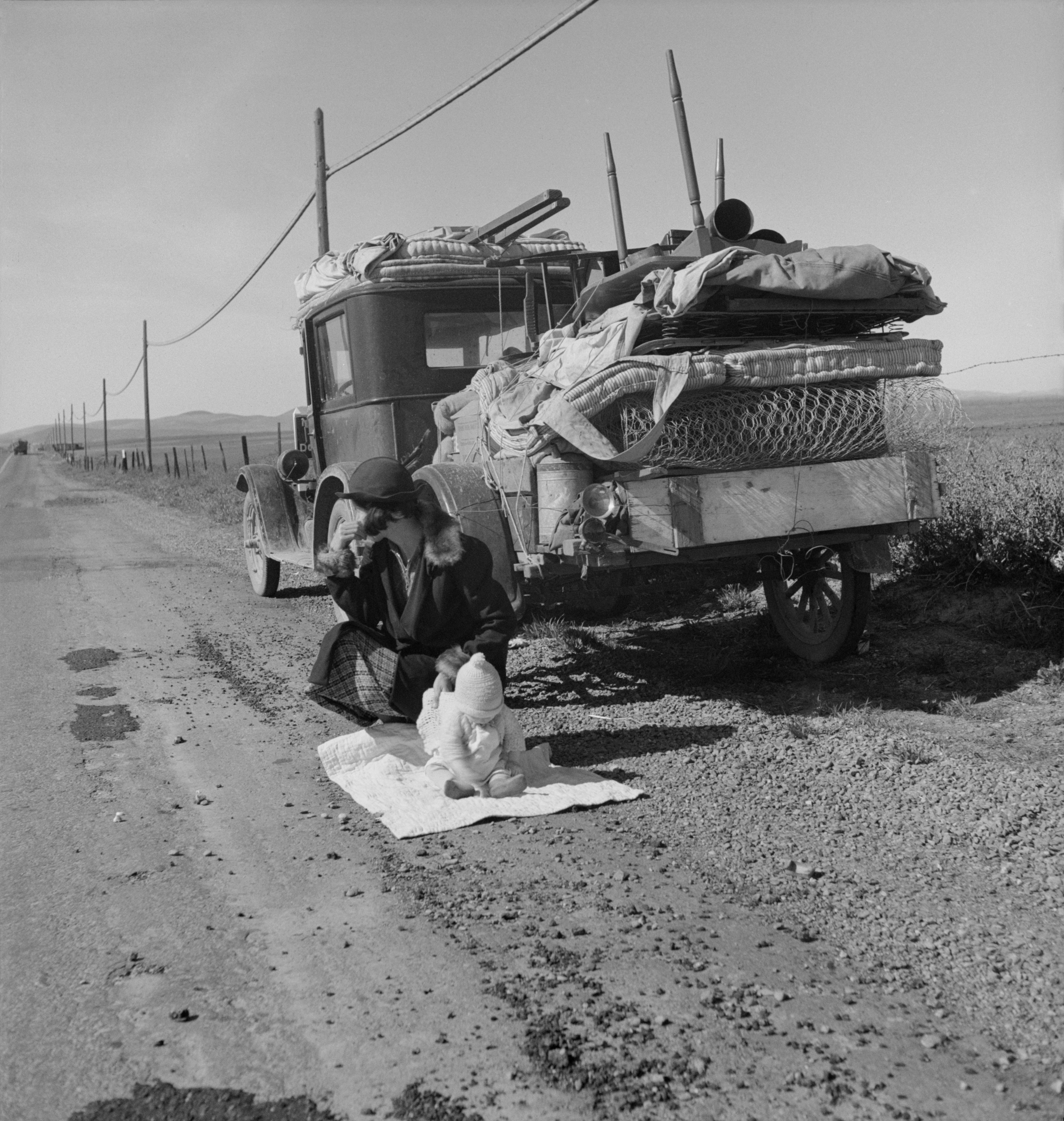
"Broke, baby sick, and car trouble!" – Dorothea Lange's 1937 photo of a Missouri migrant family's jalopy stuck near Tracy, California.

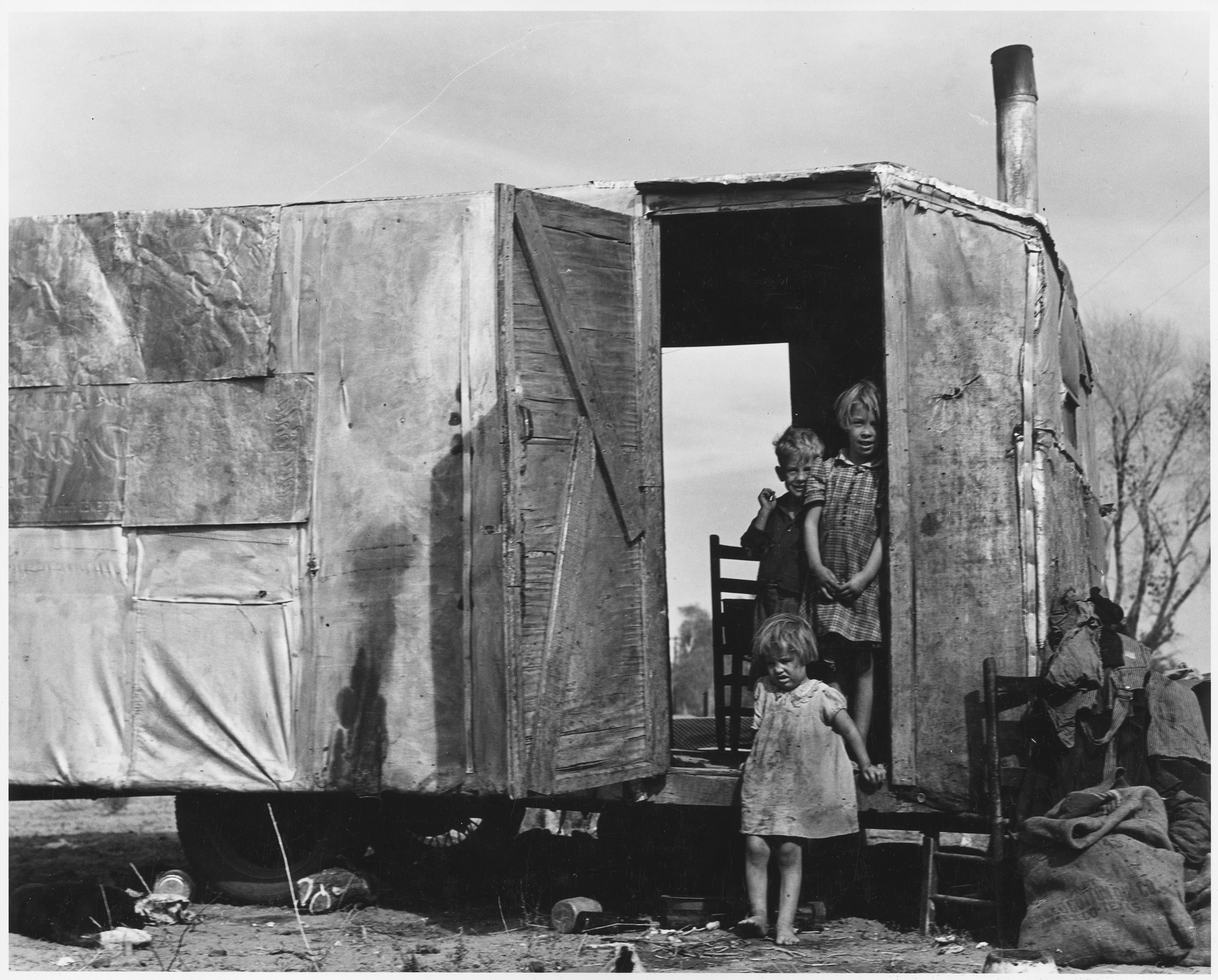
A migratory family from Texas living in a trailer in an Arizona cotton field

But not all migrants traveled long distances; most participated in internal state migration, moving from counties that the Dust Bowl badly impacted to other, less affected counties. So many families left their farms and were on the move that the proportion of migrants and residents was nearly equal in the Great Plains states.

An examination of Census Bureau statistics and other records, and a 1939 survey of occupation by the Bureau of Agricultural Economics of about 116,000 families who arrived in California in the 1930s, showed that only 43% of Southwesterners were doing farm work immediately before they migrated. Nearly a third of all migrants were professional or white-collar workers. Some farmers had to take on unskilled labor when they moved; leaving the farming sector commonly led to greater social mobility as there was a far greater likelihood that migrant farmers would later go into semi-skilled or high-skilled fields that paid better. Non-farmers experienced more downward occupational moves than farmers, but in most cases they were not significant enough to bring them into poverty, because high-skilled migrants were most likely to experience a downward shift into semi-skilled work. While semi-skilled work did not pay as well as high-skilled work, most of these workers were not impoverished. For the most part, by the end of the Dust Bowl the migrants generally were better off than those who chose to stay behind.

After the Great Depression ended, some migrants moved back to their original states. Many others remained where they had resettled. As of 2007, about one-eighth of California's population was of Okie heritage.

== Changes in agriculture and population on the Plains ==
Agricultural land and revenue boomed during World War I, but fell during the Great Depression and the 1930s. The agricultural land most affected by the Dust Bowl was 16 million acres (6.5 million hectares) of land in the Texas and Oklahoma panhandles. These 20 counties that the U.S. Department of Agriculture's Soil Conservation Service identified as the worst wind-eroded region were home to the majority of the Great Plains migrants during the Dust Bowl.

While migration from and between the Southern Great Plain States was greater than migration in other regions in the 1930s, the numbers of migrants from these areas had only slightly increased from the 1920s. The Dust Bowl and Great Depression thus did not trigger a mass exodus of southern migrants, but simply encouraged these migrants to keep moving where in other areas the Great Depression limited mobility due to economic issues, decreasing migration. While the population of the Great Plains did fall during the Dust Bowl and Great Depression, the drop was not caused by extreme numbers of migrants leaving the Great Plains but by of a lack of migrants moving from outside the Great Plains into the region.

== Government response ==
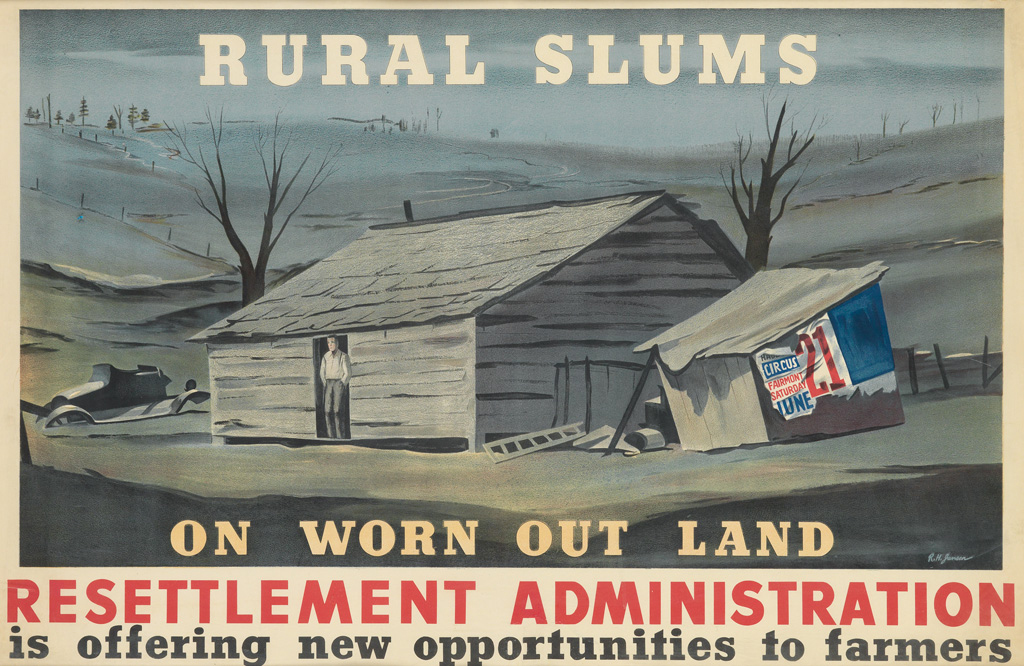
Resettlement Administration poster by Richard H. Jansen, 1935

Government's greatly expanded participation in land management and soil conservation was an important result of the disaster. Different groups took many different approaches to responding to the disaster. To identify areas that needed attention, groups such as the Soil Conservation Service generated detailed soil maps and took photos of the land from the sky. To create shelterbelts to reduce soil erosion, groups such as the United States Forest Service's Prairie States Forestry Project planted trees on private lands. Groups like the Resettlement Administration, which later became the Farm Security Administration, encouraged small farm owners to resettle on other lands if they lived in drier parts of the Plains.

During President Franklin D. Roosevelt's first 100 days in office in 1933, his administration quickly initiated programs to conserve soil and restore the region's ecological balance. Interior Secretary Harold L. Ickes established the Soil Erosion Service in August 1933 under Hugh Hammond Bennett. In 1935, it was transferred and reorganized under the Department of Agriculture and renamed the Soil Conservation Service. It is now known as the Natural Resources Conservation Service (NRCS).

As part of New Deal programs, Congress passed the Soil Conservation and Domestic Allotment Act in 1936, requiring landowners to share the allocated government subsidies with the laborers who worked on their farms. Under the law, "benefit payments were continued as measures for production control and income support, but they were now financed by direct Congressional appropriations and justified as soil conservation measures. The Act shifted the parity goal from price equality of agricultural commodities and the articles that farmers buy to income equality of farm and non-farm population." Thus, the parity goal was to re-create the ratio between the purchasing power of the net income per person on farms from agriculture and that of the income of persons not on farms that prevailed during 1909–1914.

To stabilize prices, the government paid farmers and ordered more than six million pigs to be slaughtered as part of the Agricultural Adjustment Act (AAA). It paid to have the meat packed and distributed to the poor and hungry. The Federal Surplus Relief Corporation (FSRC) was established to regulate crop and other surpluses. In a May 14, 1935, address to the AAA, Roosevelt said:

Let me make one other point clear for the benefit of the millions in cities who have to buy meats. Last year the Nation suffered a drought of unparalleled intensity. If there had been no Government program, if the old order had obtained in 1933 and 1934, that drought on the cattle ranges of America and in the corn belt would have resulted in the marketing of thin cattle, immature hogs and the death of these animals on the range and on the farm, and if the old order had been in effect those years, we would have had a vastly greater shortage than we face today. Our program – we can prove it – saved the lives of millions of head of livestock. They are still on the range, and other millions of heads are today canned and ready for this country to eat.

The FSRC diverted agricultural commodities to relief organizations. Apples, beans, canned beef, flour and pork products were distributed through local relief channels. Cotton goods were later included, to clothe needy.

In 1935, the federal government formed a Drought Relief Service (DRS) to coordinate relief activities. The DRS bought cattle in counties that were designated emergency areas for $14 to $20 a head. Animals determined unfit for human consumption were killed; at the beginning of the program, more than 50% were so designated in emergency areas. The DRS assigned the remaining cattle to the Federal Surplus Relief Corporation (FSRC) to be used in food distribution to families nationwide. Although it was difficult for farmers to give up their herds, the cattle slaughter program helped many of them avoid bankruptcy. "The government cattle buying program was a blessing to many farmers, as they could not afford to keep their cattle, and the government paid a better price than they could obtain in local markets."

Roosevelt ordered the Civilian Conservation Corps to plant the Great Plains Shelterbelt, a huge belt of more than 200 million trees from Canada to Abilene, Texas, to break the wind, hold water in the soil, and hold the soil in place. The administration also began to educate farmers on soil conservation and anti-erosion techniques, including crop rotation, strip farming, contour plowing, and terracing. In 1937, the federal government began an aggressive campaign to encourage Dust Bowl farmers to adopt planting and plowing methods that conserved the soil. The government paid reluctant farmers a dollar an acre (equivalent to $22 in 2025) to use the new methods. By 1938, the massive conservation effort had reduced the amount of blowing soil by 65%. The land still failed to yield a decent living. In the fall of 1939, after nearly a decade of dirt and dust, the drought ended when regular rainfall finally returned to the region. The government still encouraged continuing the use of conservation methods to protect the Plains' soil and ecology.

At the end of the drought, the programs implemented during the tough times helped sustain a friendly relationship between farmers and the federal government.

The President's Drought Committee issued a report in 1935 covering the government's assistance to agriculture during 1934 through mid-1935: it discussed conditions, measures of relief, organization, finances, operations, and results of the government's assistance.

== Long-term economic impact ==
This catastrophe intensified the economic impact of the Great Depression in the region. The abandonment of homesteads and financial ruin resulting from catastrophic topsoil loss led to widespread hunger and poverty.

In many regions, more than 75% of the topsoil was blown away by the end of the 1930s. Land degradation varied widely. Aside from the short-term economic consequences of erosion, the Dust Bowl had severe long-term economic consequences.

By 1940, counties that had experienced the most erosion had a greater decline in agricultural land values. The per-acre value of farmland declined by 28% in high-erosion counties and 17% in medium-erosion counties, relative to land value changes in low-erosion counties. Even over the long term, the land's agricultural value often failed to return to pre-Dust Bowl levels. In highly eroded areas, less than 25% of the original agricultural losses were recovered. The economy adjusted predominantly through large relative population declines in more-eroded counties, both during the 1930s and through the 1950s.

The economic effects persisted in part because of farmers' failure to switch to more appropriate crops for highly eroded areas. Because the amount of topsoil had been reduced, it would have been more productive to shift from crops and wheat to animals and hay. During the Depression and through at least the 1950s, there was limited relative adjustment of farmland away from activities that became less productive in more-eroded counties.

Some of the failure to shift to more productive agricultural products may be related to ignorance about the benefits of changing land use. A second explanation is a lack of availability of credit, caused by the high rate of failure of banks in the Plains states. Because banks failed in the Dust Bowl region at a higher rate than elsewhere, farmers could not get the credit they needed to obtain capital to shift crop production. In addition, profit margins in either animals or hay were still minimal, and farmers at first had little incentive to change their crops.

Patrick Allitt recounts how fellow historian Donald Worster responded to his return visit to the Dust Bowl in the mid-1970s when he revisited some of the worst afflicted counties:

Capital-intensive agribusiness had transformed the scene; deep wells into the aquifer, intensive irrigation, the use of artificial pesticides and fertilizers, and giant harvesters were creating immense crops year after year whether it rained or not. According to the farmers he interviewed, technology had provided the perfect answer to old troubles, such of the bad days would not return. In Worster's view, by contrast, the scene demonstrated that America's capitalist high-tech farmers had learned nothing. They were continuing to work in an unsustainable way, devoting far cheaper subsidized energy to growing food than the energy could give back to its ultimate consumers.

In contrast with Worster's pessimism, historian Mathew Bonnifield argued that the Dust Bowl's long-term significance was "the triumph of the human spirit in its capacity to endure and overcome hardships and reverses."

A 2023 study in the Journal of Economic History found that while the Dust Bowl had large and enduring impacts on agricultural land, it had modest impacts on average wage incomes.

== Influence on the arts and culture ==
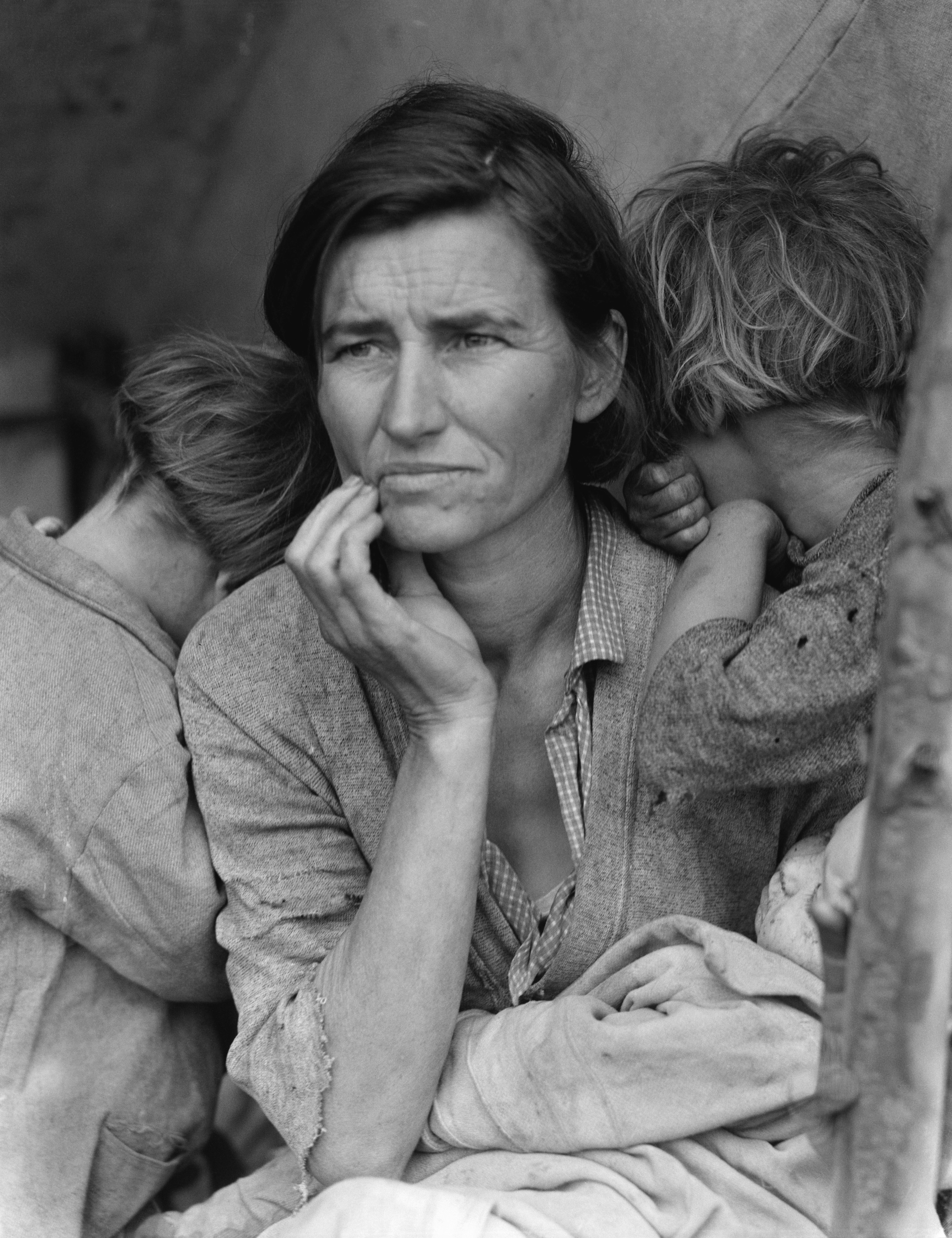
Florence Owens Thompson seen in the photo Migrant Mother by Dorothea Lange

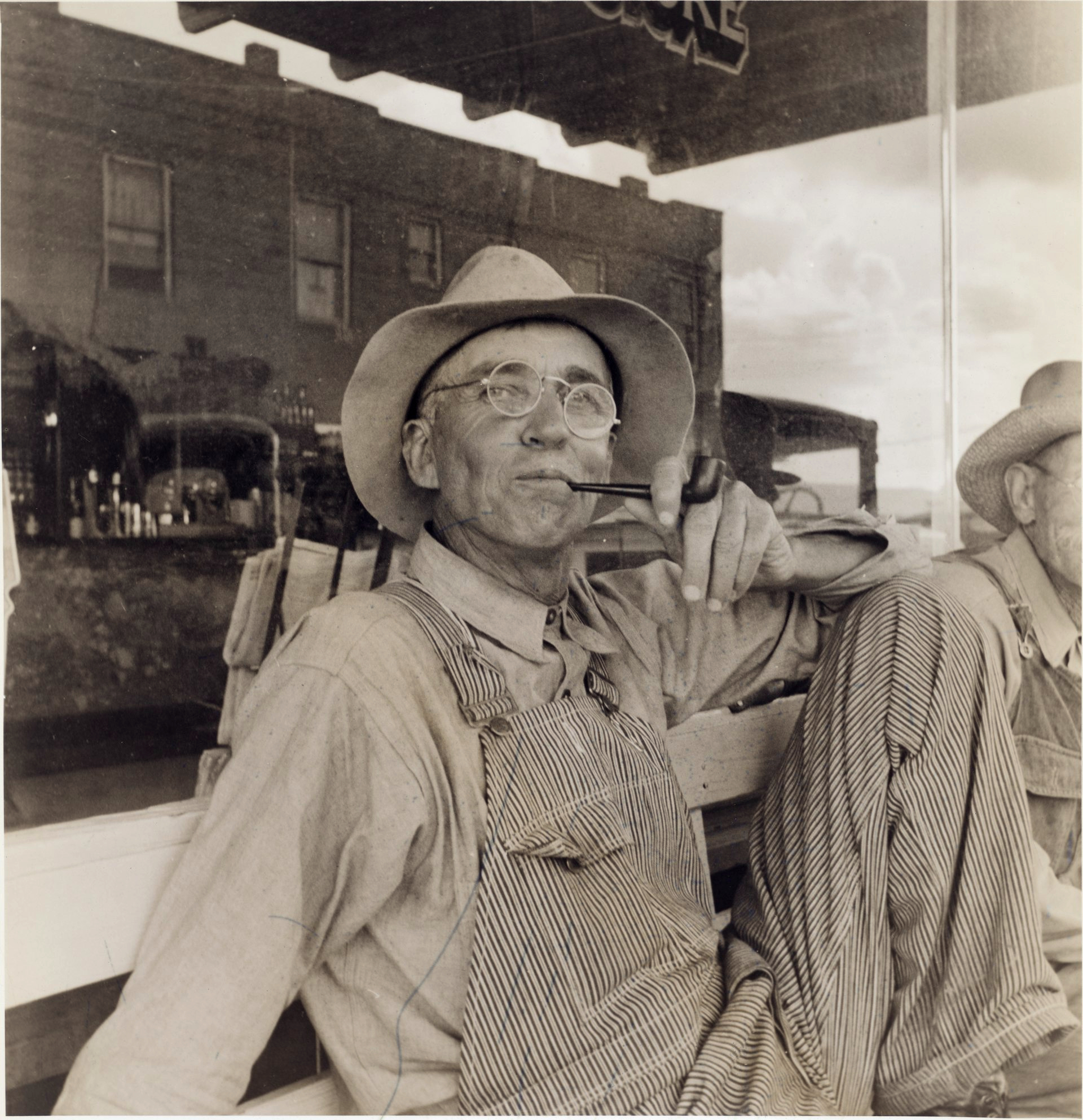
"Dust bowl farmers of west Texas in town", photograph taken by Dorothea Lange, June 1937, in Anton, Texas.

The crisis was documented by photographers, musicians, and authors, many hired during the Great Depression by the federal government. For instance, the Farm Security Administration hired photographers to document the crisis. Artists such as Dorothea Lange were aided by having salaried work during the Depression. She captured what have become classic images of the dust storms and migrant families. Among her best-known photographs is Destitute Pea Pickers in California. Mother of Seven Children depicted a gaunt-looking woman, Florence Owens Thompson, holding three of her children. This picture expressed the struggles of people caught by the Dust Bowl and raised awareness in other parts of the country of its reach and human cost. Decades later, Thompson disliked the boundless circulation of the photo and resented that she had received no money from its broadcast. Thompson felt it made her perceived as a Dust Bowl "Okie".

The work of independent artists was also influenced by the crises of the Dust Bowl and the Depression. Author John Steinbeck, borrowing closely from field notes taken by Farm Security Administration worker and author Sanora Babb, wrote The Grapes of Wrath (1939) about migrant workers and farm families displaced by the Dust Bowl. Babb's own novel about the lives of the migrant workers, Whose Names Are Unknown, was written in 1939, but was eclipsed and shelved in response to Steinbeck's success, and was not published till 2004. Many of folk singer Woody Guthrie's songs, such as those on his 1940 album Dust Bowl Ballads, are about his experiences in the Dust Bowl era during the Great Depression, when he traveled with displaced farmers from Oklahoma to California and learned their traditional folk and blues songs, earning him the nickname the "Dust Bowl Troubadour".

Migrants also influenced musical culture wherever they went. Oklahoma migrants, in particular, were rural Southwesterners who carried their traditional country music to California. Today, the "Bakersfield Sound" describes this blend, which developed after the migrants brought country music to the city. Their new music inspired a proliferation of country dance halls as far south as Los Angeles.

The 2003–2005 HBO TV series Carnivàle was set during the Dust Bowl period.

The 2014 science fiction film Interstellar features a ravaged 21st-century America that is again scoured by dust storms (caused by a worldwide pathogen affecting all crops). Along with inspiration from the 1930s crisis, director Christopher Nolan features interviews from the 2012 documentary The Dust Bowl to draw further parallels.

In 2017, Americana recording artist Grant Maloy Smith released the album Dust Bowl – American Stories, inspired by the history of the Dust Bowl. In a review, the music magazine No Depression wrote that the album's lyrics and music are "as potent as Woody Guthrie, as intense as John Trudell and dusted with the trials and tribulations of Tom Joad – Steinbeck and The Grapes of Wrath."

== See also ==
- 1936 North American heat wave
- Desertification
- Goyder's Line – semiarid area of Australia
- Global warming
- List of environmental disasters
- Monoculture
- Ogallala Aquifer
- Palliser's Triangle – semiarid area of Canada
- Semi-arid climate
- Tragedy of the commons
- U.S. Route 66 – notable Dust Bowl migration route to California
- Navajo Livestock Reduction – simultaneous program to prevent overgrazing and erosion

== Bibliography ==
- Bonnifield, Paul (1979). The dust bowl: men, dirt, and depression. Albuquerque: University of New Mexico Press. ISBN 978-0-8263-0485-8.
- Cunfer, Geoff (2008). "Scaling the Dust Bowl". In Knowles, Anne Kelly; Hillier, Amy (eds.). Placing history: how maps, spatial data, and GIS are changing historical scholarship. Redlands, CA: ESRI Press. ISBN 978-1-58948-013-1.
- Gregory, James N. (1991). American exodus: the dust bowl migration and Okie culture in California. New York, NY: Oxford University Press. ISBN 978-0-19-507136-8.
- Lassieur, Allison (2009). The Dust Bowl: an interactive history adventure. You choose books. Mankato, Minn: Capstone Press. ISBN 978-1-4296-2343-8. OCLC 244177146.
- Reis, Ronald A. (2008). The Dust Bowl. Great historic disasters. New York: Infobase Publishing. ISBN 978-0-7910-9737-3.
- Sylvester, Kenneth M.; Rupley, Eric S. A. (July 2012). "Revising the Dust Bowl: High Above the Kansas Grasslands". Environmental History. 17 (3): 603–633. doi:10.1093/envhis/ems047. ISSN 1084-5453. PMC 4185197. PMID 25288873.
- Worster, Donald (2004). Dust Bowl: the southern Plains in the 1930s (25th anniversary ed.). New York: Oxford University Press. ISBN 978-0-19-517489-2.
- Guthrie, Woody; Seeger, Pete (1963). Woody Guthrie folk songs: a collection of songs by America's foremost balladeer. New York: Ludlow Music. OCLC 1036976480.
- Lomax, Alan; Guthrie, Woody; Seeger, Pete (1967). Hard hitting songs for hard-hit people. New York, N.Y.: Oak Publications. ISBN 978-0-8256-0041-8. OCLC 190819.
- Egan, Timothy (2006). The worst hard time: the untold story of those who survived the great American dust bowl. Boston: Mariner Books. ISBN 978-0-618-34697-4.
- Janke, Katelan (2002). Survival in the storm: the dust bowl diary of Grace Edwards. Dear America. New York: Scholastic. ISBN 978-0-439-21599-2.
- Sweeney, Kevin Z. (2016). Prelude to the Dust Bowl: drought in the Nineteenth-Century Southern Plains. Norman: University of Oklahoma Press. ISBN 978-0-8061-5340-7.

== Documentary films ==
- 1936 – The Plow That Broke the Plains – 25 minutes, directed by Pare Lorentz
- 1998 – Surviving the Dust Bowl – 52 minutes, season 10 episode of American Experience documentary tv series
- 2012 – The Dust Bowl – 240 minutes, 4 episodes, directed by Ken Burns
