= Whose Names Are Unknown =

Novel by Sanora Babb written in 1930s

- Author: Sanora Babb
- Language: English
- Genre: Fiction
- Publisher: University of Oklahoma Press
- Publication date: 2004
- Publication place: American literature
- Media type: Print (paperback)
- Pages: 240
- ISBN: 978-0806137124

Whose Names Are Unknown is an American novel by Sanora Babb, written in the 1930s but not published until 2004. It centers on members of a High Plains farm family during the Great Depression as they endure the poverty inflicted by drought and the Dust Bowl; they ultimately flee to California in hopes of building a better life but encounter a new set of hardships.

Although accepted by a major publisher, the book was shelved after a similar novel by a celebrated author, The Grapes of Wrath by John Steinbeck, was published first. After Whose Names Are Unknown finally reached print, some scholars and critics noted that Steinbeck had had access to Babb's notes and appeared to have borrowed from her work in crafting his own novel.

== Plot and summary ==
The first section of the novel, "Oklahoma Panhandle," introduces Julia and Milt Dunne, farmers in western Oklahoma during the 1930s. They live in a dugout basement with Milt's father ("the old man" or "Konkie") and their daughters Myra and Lonnie. After another year of barely making ends meet with his usual broomcorn crop, Milt persuades his father to try planting winter wheat and purchases seed using money that was set aside for clothing for the family. The wheat harvest goes well and the family finds itself financially secure for a brief time, but then a summer drought arrives, and with it billowing clouds of dust that suffocate the crops and sicken the children. Other farmers are similarly beleaguered, beset with failing crops, abundant debt, and little hope.

With the few resources they have left, the Dunnes (minus the old man) decide to follow in the footsteps of other "Okies" and head to California, lured by the promise of plentiful resources and abundant jobs. In the second section of the novel, "California," the reality turns out to be less idyllic. The flood of refugees from the east means low pay for menial jobs, mostly picking crops. The Dunnes are forced to live in tents and move from camp to camp in a desperate attempt to earn enough to survive. They are hampered by a company store system that substitutes store scrip for wages and holds workers financially hostage to their bosses. The Dunnes' desperation, and that of the other farmworkers, grows as they find that no matter how hard they work, they are unable even to feed their children. An attempt to organize in protest of working and living conditions results in Milt's beating and arrest and leaves the workers jobless and homeless, as the company is easily able to find replacement laborers.

The novel closes with Milt's realization that workers on company farms are no more than "a lot of parts that can't stand alone because we haven't got an acre of our own to keep our feet on...[T]hese bosses of ours...[are] looking out for the Almighty Dollar, and if they have to starve us to get more'n they can count, they can do it because there's more where we come from. They can do it because they never have to look a poor man or woman in the eye. We ain't human, we're figures on the books." In the final paragraphs, the workers reach a shared resolve to persevere despite the hardships, to organize, and to "stand together as one man. They would rise and fall and, in their falling, rise again."

== Development ==
As a native Oklahoman and a former journalist whose family had experienced crop failures and poverty – and who herself had been homeless for a time after the Wall Street crash of 1929 – Sanora Babb was perhaps uniquely suited to write about the diaspora that was occurring in the American West during the Great Depression.

In 1938, having had her stories published in some small activist magazines, Babb went to California and volunteered to work for the Farm Security Administration (FSA), assisting migrant farmers to improve their living conditions while taking notes for a planned novel about the migrant experience. Her supervisor was Tom Collins, a migrant camp manager, who had also become acquainted with another writer researching his own book about the plight of California farmworkers: John Steinbeck.

"How brave they all are," Babb wrote in her notes of the farmworkers she had met. "They aren't broken and docile but they don't complain...They all want work and hate to have help."

Babb set about composing her novel and in early 1939 sent several sample chapters to Random House, the prestigious New York publishing firm, whose co-founder and editor, Bennett Cerf, responded enthusiastically and offered her a publishing contract. At the same time, however, Steinbeck was writing The Grapes of Wrath, which competitor Viking Press published in April 1939. After Steinbeck's novel appeared, to critical acclaim, Cerf shelved Babb's novel, telling her "Obviously, another book at this time about exactly the same subject would be a sad anticlimax!" Babb attempted to interest other publishers in Whose Names Are Unknown but ultimately put her manuscript in a drawer. She turned to writing poetry, short stories, and non-fiction, and would not publish another novel for almost 20 years.

Although Babb's novel was known to historians and literary scholars, and acclaimed by those who had a chance to read it, Whose Names Are Unknown remained unpublished. In the mid-1990s, after several of Babb's novels had been returned to print, the author showed her friend and literary agent Joanne Dearcropp a copy of the manuscript for Whose Names Are Unknown; Dearcropp was able to attract the interest of the University of Oklahoma Press, which focuses on books about the Dust Bowl experience.

As Babb explains in an author's note, the title of the novel comes from the legal notices used by company town owners to evict resident workers who had broken rules or otherwise caused trouble. Often the owners had no knowledge or record of the identities of the workers. One such notice, bearing the heading "To John Doe and Mary Doe, whose true names are unknown...", appears on page 220 of the novel.

== Influence on The Grapes of Wrath ==
Following the publication of Whose Names Are Unknown in 2004, some scholars noted strong parallels between that work and Steinbeck's The Grapes of Wrath.

In his introduction to the first edition of Babb's novel, Lawrence R. Rodgers, author of Canaan Bound: The African-American Great Migration Novel, wrote that Tom Collins, Babb's supervisor at the migrant camp where she worked, asked her "to keep notes and was later impressed enough by the results to request a copy of them for another writer who was visiting the camp to research a novel. That writer was John Steinbeck."

Writing in The Steinbeck Review, Michael J. Meyer noted numerous "obvious similarities" between the two novels "that even a cursory reading will reveal", such as Babb's account of two still-born babies, mirrored in Steinbeck's description of Rosasharn's baby. Among other scenes and themes repeated in both books: the villainy of banks, corporations, and company stores that charge exorbitant prices; the rejection of religion and the embrace of music as a means of preserving hope; descriptions of the fecundity of nature and agriculture, and the contrast with the impoverishment of the migrants; and the disparity between those willing to extend assistance to the migrants and others who view "Okies" as subhuman. Meyer, a Steinbeck bibliographer, stops short of labeling these parallels as plagiarism but concludes that "Steinbeck scholars would do well to read Babb – if only to see for themselves the echoes of Grapes that abound in her prose."

Steinbeck scholar David M. Wrobel wrote that "the John Steinbeck/Sanora Babb story sounds like a classic smash-and-grab: celebrated California author steals the material of unknown Oklahoma writer, resulting in his financial success and her failure to get her work published...Steinbeck absorbed field information from many sources, primarily Tom Collins and Eric H. Thomsen, regional director of the federal migrant camp program in California, who accompanied Steinbeck on missions of mercy...if Steinbeck read Babb's extensive notes as carefully as he did the reports of Collins, he would certainly have found them useful. His interaction with Collins and Thomsen – and their influence on the writing of The Grapes of Wrath – is documented because Steinbeck acknowledged both. Sanora Babb went unmentioned."

Writing in Broad Street magazine, Carla Dominguez described Babb as "devastated and bitter" that Random House cancelled publication of her own novel after The Grapes of Wrath was released in 1939. It is clear, she wrote, that "Babb's retellings, interactions, and reflections were secretly read over and appropriated by Steinbeck. Babb met Steinbeck briefly and by chance at a lunch counter, but she never thought that he had been reading her notes because he did not mention it." When Babb's novel was finally published in 2004, she declared that she was a better writer than Steinbeck. "His book," Babb said, "is not as realistic as mine."

== Critical reception ==
Whose Names Are Unknown received positive reviews from critics, many of whom found that the novel's largely female viewpoint and straightforward, almost documentary-like realism compared favorably to the digressions, allegory, and religious references that filled Steinbeck's similarly themed The Grapes of Wrath.

The Women's Review of Books described Whose Names Are Unknown as "an intimate and powerful story...Babb's love and intimate knowledge of the land and the people of the plains segue into the beginning of a migrant workers' movement. At last we hear the whole powerful story from the point of view of a woman who had actual experience with both the origin and the destination of the migrants."

The journal Western American Literature found that Babb had achieved "an intimate, familiar sense of who the people are; we get to know them as if we lived among them, which of course Babb did...Babb engages the reader with her abiding love of the land and its people while directing a powerfully executed critique of an unjust polity that devalues and marginalizes its citizens."

Writing in frieze magazine, American poet and essayist Anne Boyer described the novel as "a revolutionary book for those for whom no revolution came, and it's not alone in that...These books read like artifacts from a future that never arrived, the major works of a parallel present, and the minor works of our own. They are suppressed or discouraged or forgotten not because of any individual misfortune, but from a collective one: the world in which these works would take their place as great literature never became ours."

Reviewing the audiobook version of the novel, narrated by Alyssa Bresnahan, AudioFile magazine called Whose Names Are Unknown a "first-class novel", "deeply felt and deeply human," and peopled by "many remarkable characters".
