= The Dust Bowl (miniseries) =

- Genre: Documentary
- Written by: Dayton Duncan
- Directed by: Ken Burns
- Starring: Patricia Clarkson; Kevin Conway; Amy Madigan; Carolyn McCormick
- Narrated by: Peter Coyote
- Theme music composer: Craig Mellish
- Country of origin: United States
- Original language: English
- No. of episodes: 2

Production
- Producers: Dayton Duncan; Ken Burns; Julie Dunfey
- Cinematography: Buddy Squires; Stephen McCarthy
- Editors: Craig Mellish; Ryan Gifford
- Running time: 240 minutes
- Production companies: Florentine Films; WETA-TV

Original release
- Release: November 18 – November 19, 2012

The Dust Bowl is a 2012 American television documentary miniseries directed by Ken Burns which aired on PBS on November 18 and 19, 2012. The two-part miniseries recounts the impact of the Dust Bowl on the United States during the Great Depression of the 1930s.

The series features the voices of Patricia Clarkson, Peter Coyote, and Carolyn McCormick.

== Episodes ==
1. Episode One: The Great Plow-Up
2. Episode Two: Reaping the Whirlwind

== Bonus Episodes ==
1. A Land of Haze
2. Grab a Root and Growl
3. Interviews
4. The Dust Bowl Eyewitnesses
5. The Dust Bowl Legacy
6. Uncovering the Dust Bowl

== Other uses ==
Interviews from the documentary were used in the 2014 film Interstellar, that deals with massive dust storms in a near future.

== Critical reception ==
The Dust Bowl has received generally positive reviews from television critics and parents of young children. Robert Lloyd of the Los Angeles Times wrote, "Timely...exceptional." Historians on the other hand raised concerns about some of the evidence and research ignored by the film makers.

== See also ==
- Caroline Henderson
- Sanora Babb – works referenced in series
- American Experience (season 10) – Surviving the Dust Bowl aired on PBS in 1998
- The Plow That Broke the Plains (1936 documentary by Pare Lorentz)
