= Okie =

Ethnic group in the United States, pejorative term referring to an Oklahoman

Oklahoman
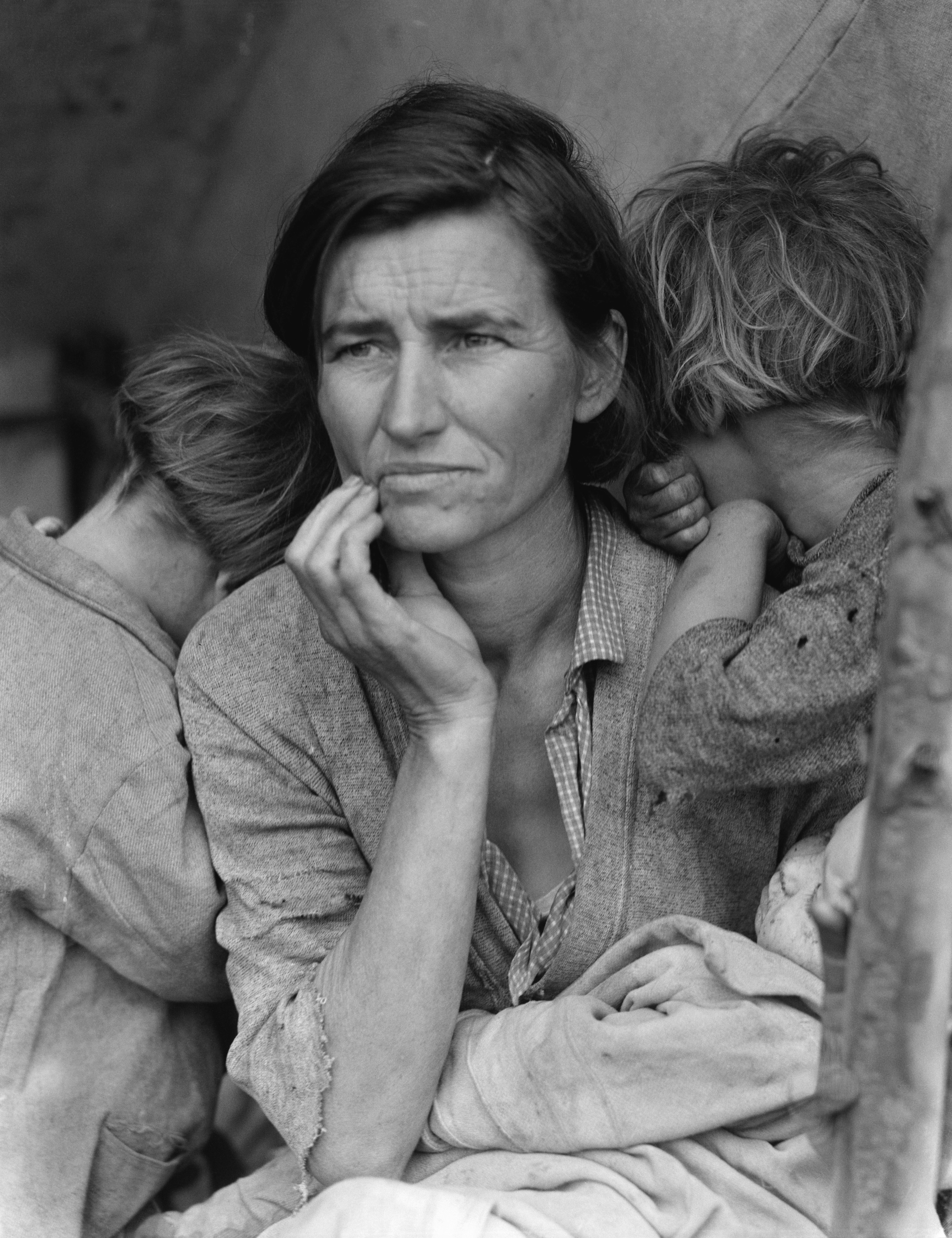
- Migrant Mother (1936) by Dorothea Lange featuring Florence Owens Thompson

Regions with significant populations
- United States, especially Oklahoma and California (primarily of ancestral descent)

Languages
- English (including Oklahoman English), Native American languages

Religion
- Predominantly Southern Baptist, with Methodist, Lutheran, Pentecostal minorities

Related ethnic groups
- White Southerners, Native Oklahomans, Appalachians

An Okie is a person identified with the state of Oklahoma, or their descendants. This connection may be residential, historical or cultural. For most Okies, several (or all) of these connections exist and are collectively the source of their being Oklahoman. While not an official demographic used or recognized by the United States Census Bureau, Okies, due to various factors, have developed their own distinct culture within larger social groupings both akin to and separate from Midwestern and Southern influences. Included are their own dialect, music, and Indigenous-derived folklore.

In California (and, to some extent, Oregon and Washington), the term came to refer to very poor migrants from Oklahoma coming to look for employment. The Dust Bowl and the Okie migration of the 1930s brought in over a million migrants, many seeking work as farmhands in the Central Valley. A study in the 1990s found that about 3.75 million Californians were descendants of this population. By 1950, four million individuals, or one quarter of all persons born in Oklahoma, Texas, Arkansas, or Missouri, lived outside the region, primarily in the West.

Prominent Okies included singer/songwriter Woody Guthrie and country musician Merle Haggard. John Steinbeck wrote about Okies moving west in his Pulitzer Prize-winning 1939 novel The Grapes of Wrath, which was filmed in 1940 by John Ford.

== Great Depression usage ==
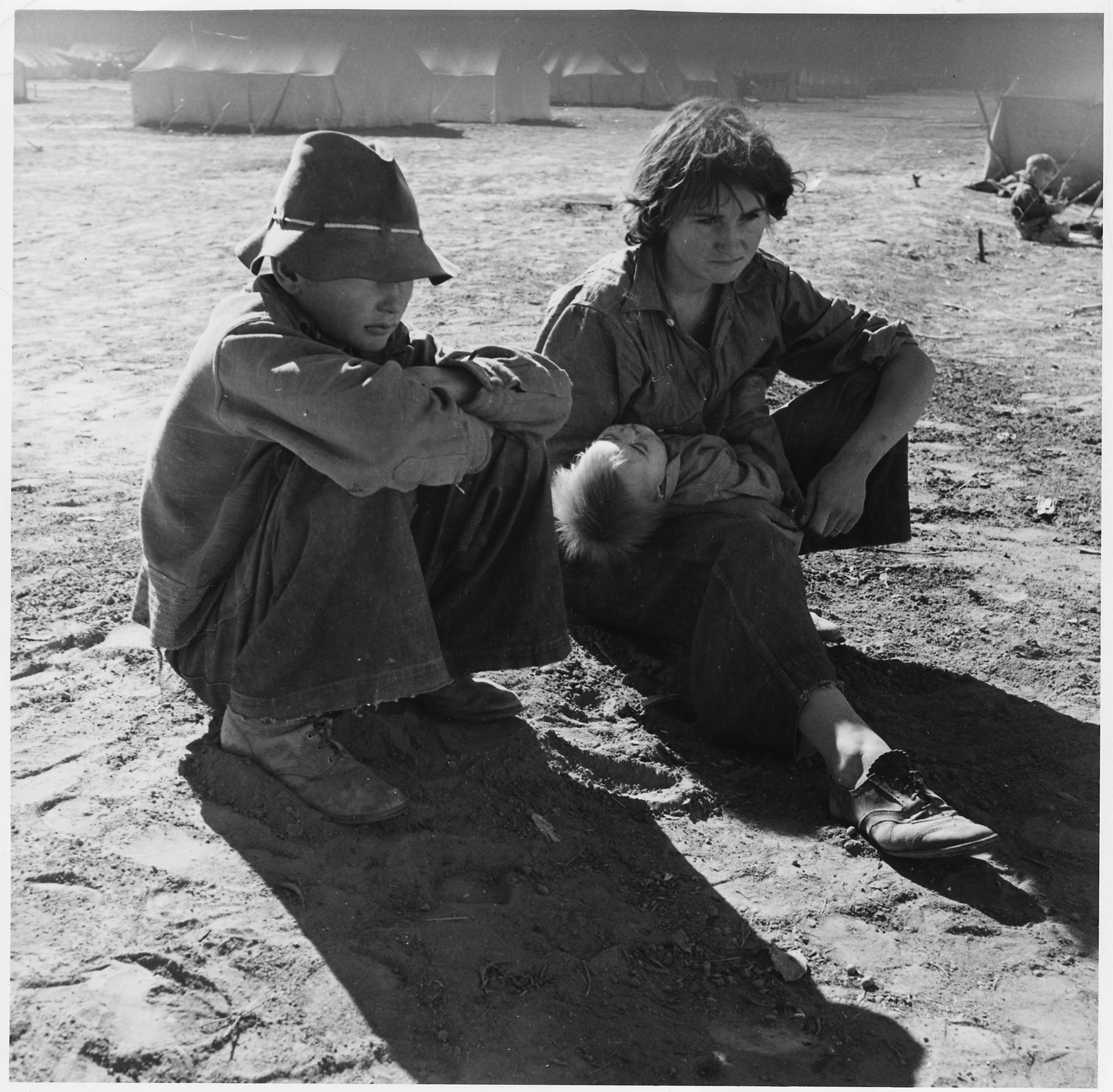
An 18-year-old Okie mother, pictured holding her child, stranded penniless in the Imperial Valley, 1937

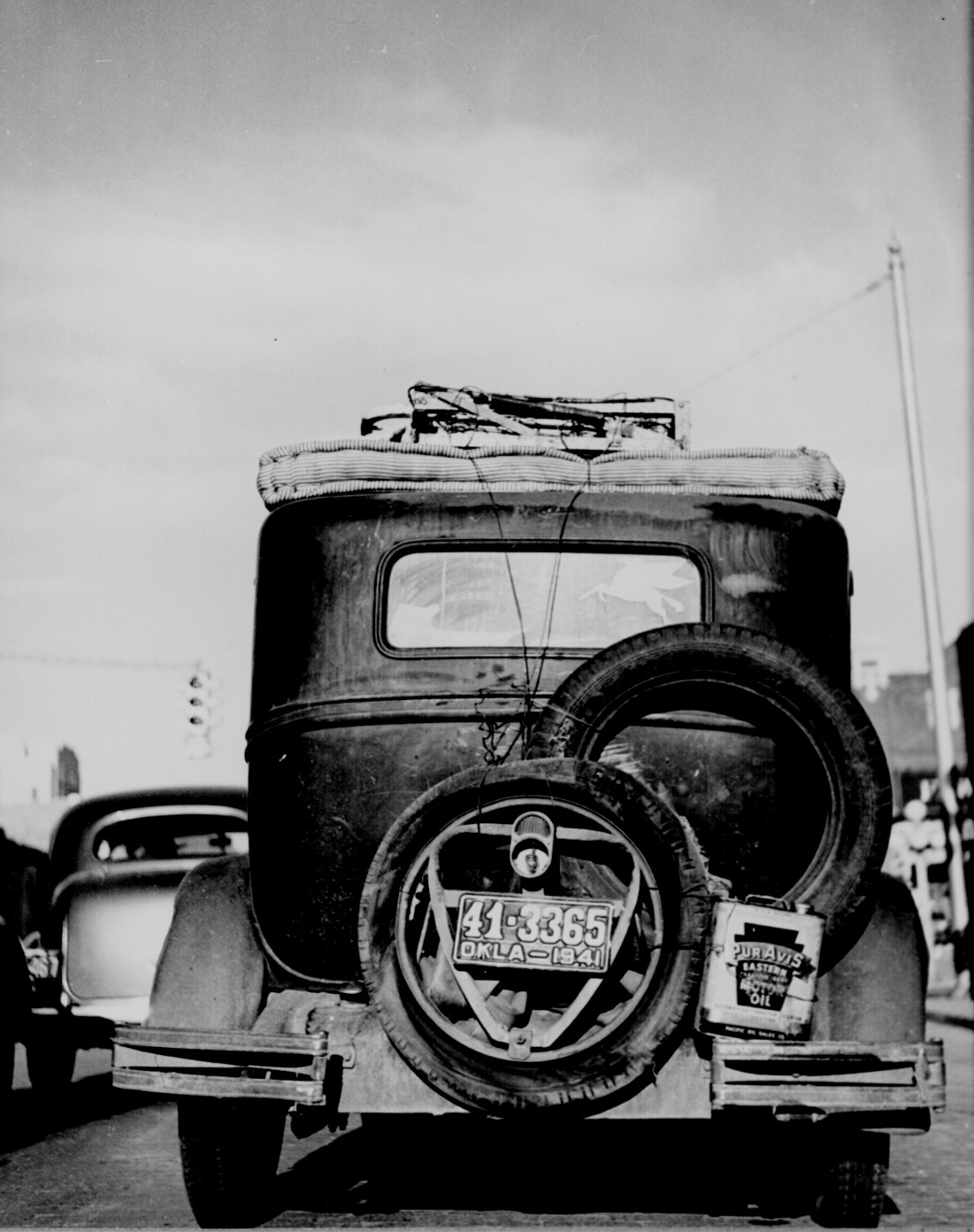
Rear view of an Okie's car, passing through Amarillo, heading west, 1941

In the mid-1930s, during the Dust Bowl, large numbers of farmers fleeing ecological disaster and the Great Depression migrated from the Great Plains and Southwest to California mostly along historic U.S. Route 66. Californians began calling all migrants by that name, even though many newcomers were not actually Oklahomans. The migrants included people from Oklahoma, Arkansas, Missouri, Iowa, Nebraska, Kansas, Texas, Colorado and New Mexico, but were all referred to as "Okies" and "Arkies". More of the migrants were from Oklahoma than any other state, and a total of 15% of the Oklahoma population left for California.

Ben Reddick, a free-lance journalist and later publisher of the Paso Robles Daily Press, is credited with first using the term Okie, in the mid-1930s, to identify migrant farm workers. He noticed the "OK" abbreviation (for Oklahoma) on many of the migrants' license plates and referred to them in his article as "Okies". The first known use of the term was in an unpublished private postcard from 1907.

== Living conditions in California during the Great Depression ==
Once the Okie families migrated from Oklahoma to California, they often were forced to work on large farms to support their families. Because of the minimal pay, these families were often forced to live on the outskirts of these farms in shanty houses they built themselves. These homes were normally set up in groups called Squatter Camps or Shanty Towns, which were often located near the irrigation ditches which ran along the outskirts of these farms. Indoor plumbing was inaccessible to these migrant workers, and so they were forced to resort to using outhouses. Unfortunately, because of the minimal space allotted to the migrant workers, their outhouses were normally located near the irrigation ditches, and some waste would inevitably runoff into the water. These irrigation ditches provided the Okie families with a water supply.

Due to this lack of sanitation in these camps, disease ran rampant among the migrant workers and their families. Also contributing to disease was that these Shanty Town homes that the Okie migrant workers lived in had no running water, and because of their minimal pay medical attention was out of the question. However, what native Californians failed to realize at the time was that these Okie migrant farm workers did not always live in the conditions that the Dust Bowl left them in. In fact, often these families had once owned their own farms and had been able to support themselves. This meant that Okie families often had been in a fairly comfortable situation before the circumstances surrounding the Dust Bowl induced their migration.

== Post-Great Depression usage ==
Historian James Gregory has explored the long-term impact of the Okies on California society. He notes that in The Grapes of Wrath, novelist John Steinbeck envisioned the migrants becoming active unionists and New Deal agitators demanding higher wages and better housing conditions. Steinbeck did not foresee that most Okies would move into well-paid jobs in war industries in the 1940s. When a man named Oliver Carson visited Kern County in the 1930s, he became fascinated with the Okie culture and lifestyle. He travelled back in 1952 to see what the Okies had made of themselves and saw that the difference was astounding. They were not living in roadside encampments anymore or driving run-down cars- they had better living situations and better views on life.

When World War II began, large amounts of money went flooding to California to aid the USA in the war. This was highly helpful for the Okies, as jobs of higher quality opened up in larger numbers and they were able to make their lives better over time. Other Okies saw this and decided they wanted to go to California to make even more money. An oil worker wanted to make enough money to go back to Oklahoma and buy a farm, another family wanted to rent out their farm while they were away to potentially double their earnings. These families that came during the 1940s lived in California's biggest cities, Los Angeles, San Diego and various cities in the San Francisco Bay Area. Other families who moved to California before had usually moved to the valleys and rural areas.

While many families had plans to leave California after making a good amount of money, they often didn't; the children and grandchildren of Okies also seldom returned to Oklahoma or farming, and are now concentrated in California's cities and suburbs. Long-term cultural impacts include a commitment to evangelical Protestantism, a love of country music, political conservatism, and strong support for traditional moral and cultural values.

It has been said that some Oklahomans who stayed and lived through the Dust Bowl see the Okie migrants as quitters who fled Oklahoma. Other Oklahoma natives are as proud of their Okies who made good in California as are the Okies themselves – and of the Arkies, West Texans, and others who were cast in with them.

In the later half of the 20th century, there became increasing evidence that any pejorative meaning of the term Okie was fading; former and present Okies began to apply the label as a badge of honor and symbol of the Okie survivor attitude.

In one example, Republican Oklahoma Governor Dewey F. Bartlett launched a campaign in the 1960s to popularize Okie as a positive term for Oklahomans; however, his Democratic opponent used the term in reference to Barlett’s birth in Ohio as political tool against him, which may have further reinforced negative associations with the term.

In 1968, Governor Bartlett made Reddick, the originator of the California usage, an honorary Okie. And in the early 1970s, Merle Haggard's country song "Okie from Muskogee" was a hit on national airwaves. During the 1970s, the term Okie became familiar to most Californians as a prototype of a subcultural group.

In the early 1990s the California Department of Transportation refused to allow the name of the "Okie Girl" restaurant to appear on a roadside sign on Interstate 5, arguing that the restaurant's name insulted Oklahomans; only after protracted controversy and a letter from the Governor of Oklahoma did the agency relent. Since then, the children and grandchildren of Okies in California changed the meaning of Okie to a self-title of pride in obtaining success, as well to challenge what they felt was snobbery or "the last group to make fun of" in the state's urban area cultures.

Muskogee Mayor John Tyler Hammons used the phrase "I'm proud to be an Okie from Muskogee" as the successful theme of his 2008 mayoral campaign. He was 19 years old at the time. 2020 U.S. Presidential candidate and U.S. Senator from Massachusetts Elizabeth Warren, who was born in Oklahoma, frequently referenced her "Okie" roots during campaign events.

== In popular culture ==
Novels

- John Steinbeck's 1939 novel The Grapes of Wrath won the Pulitzer Prize for its characterization of the Okie lifestyle and journey to California.
- In James Blish's Cities in Flight science fiction series, the term "Okie" was applied in a similar context to entire cities that, thanks to an anti-gravity device, take flight to the stars in order to escape an economic collapse on Earth. Working as a migrant labor force, these cities act as cultural pollinators, spreading technology and knowledge throughout the expanding human civilization. The later novels focus on the travels of New York City as one such Okie city, though there are many others.
- In the novel On the Road by Jack Kerouac – written between 1948 and 1949, although not published until 1957 – the term appears to refer to some of the people the main character, a New York author, meets in one of his trips around the United States.
- In the novel Paint it Black by Janet Fitch, the protagonist (an LA punk-rocker in the early 1980s) thinks of herself and her family as "Okies."
- Frank Bergon's 2011 novel Jesse's Ghost draws attention to today's sons and daughters of the California Okies portrayed in Steinbeck's The Grapes of Wrath.
- Kristin Hannah's 2021 novel The Four Winds portrays the life, struggle and survival of a single mother and her two children during the days following the Great depression (1929) and Dust Bowls. She and people like her are often termed as Okies by the Californian natives.
- Sanora Babb's 2004 novel Whose Names Are Unknown is based on the author's first-hand experience. The novel was originally scheduled to be published in 1939, but publication was shelved when Steinbeck's The Grapes of Wrath came out. The title is taken from a legal eviction notice.

Music

- April The 14th Part I & Ruination day Part II "And the Okies fled. And the great emancipater" (Time-The Revelator – Gillian Welch. Welch/Rawlings (2001).
- California Okie – Buck Owens (1976).
- Dear Okie – Doye O’Dell/Rudy Sooter (1948) – "Dear Okie, if you see Arkie, tell ’im Tex’s got a job for him out in Californy."
- Israelites & Okies -- The Lost Dogs (from the 2010 album Old Angel).
- Lonesome Okie Goin’ Home – Merl Lindsay and the Oklahoma Night Riders (1947).
- Oakie Boogie – Jack Guthrie and His Oklahomans (1947) – considered by many to be the first Rock & Roll song.
- Okanagan Okie – Stompin' Tom Connors.
- Okie – J. J. Cale (1974).
- Okie From Muskogee – Merle Haggard (from the 1969 album of the same name).
- "Okie" – a parody of the above by Patrick Sky from his 1973 album Songs that made America Famous.
- Okie Skies – The Bays Brothers (2004).
- Okies in California – Doye O'Dell (1949).
- Oklahoma Swing-by Reba McEntire and Vince Gill (1990).
- Ramblin' Okie – Terry Fell.
- Southeast Texas Girl – Jeremy Castle (2021) – "I’m as Okie as a rose rock, native as the red fern grows."

Poetry

- Cahill, Charlie. Point Blank Poetry: Okie Country Cowboy Poems. Midwest City, OK: CF Cahill, 1991. LoC Control Number: 92179243
- Harrison, Pamela. Okie Chronicles. Cincinnati: David Robert Books, 2005. ISBN 1-932339-87-6
- McDaniel, Wilma Elizabeth. California Okie Poet Laureate. All works.
- Rose, Dorothy. Dustbowl Okie Exodus. Seven Buffaloes Press, 1987. OCLC 15689360

Film

- Jack Nicholson's character in Chinatown derisively refers to a farmhand as an Okie in a scene where he is confronted for trespassing in an orange grove

Other fiction

- Charles, Henry P. That dumbest Okie, and other short stories: Oklahoma! "The land of honest men and slender women." Wetzel, c1952.
- Cuelho, Artie, Jr. At the Rainbow's End: A Dustbowl Collection of Prose and Poetry of the Okie Migration to the San Joaquin Valley. Big Timber, Montana: Seven Buffaloes Press, 1982. ISBN 0-916380-25-4
- Haslam, Gerald. Okies: Selected Stories. Santa Barbara, California: Peregrine Smith, Inc, 1975. ISBN 0-87905-042-X
- Hudson, Lois Phillips. Reapers of the Dust. Minnesota Historical Society Press, 1984. ISBN 0-87351-177-8

== See also ==
- Black Sunday
- Dust Bowl
- Grapes of Wrath
- Migrant worker
- Hillbilly Highway
- Newfie
- Redneck
- Urban Appalachians
- Will Rogers
- Yokel
