= Woody Guthrie discography =

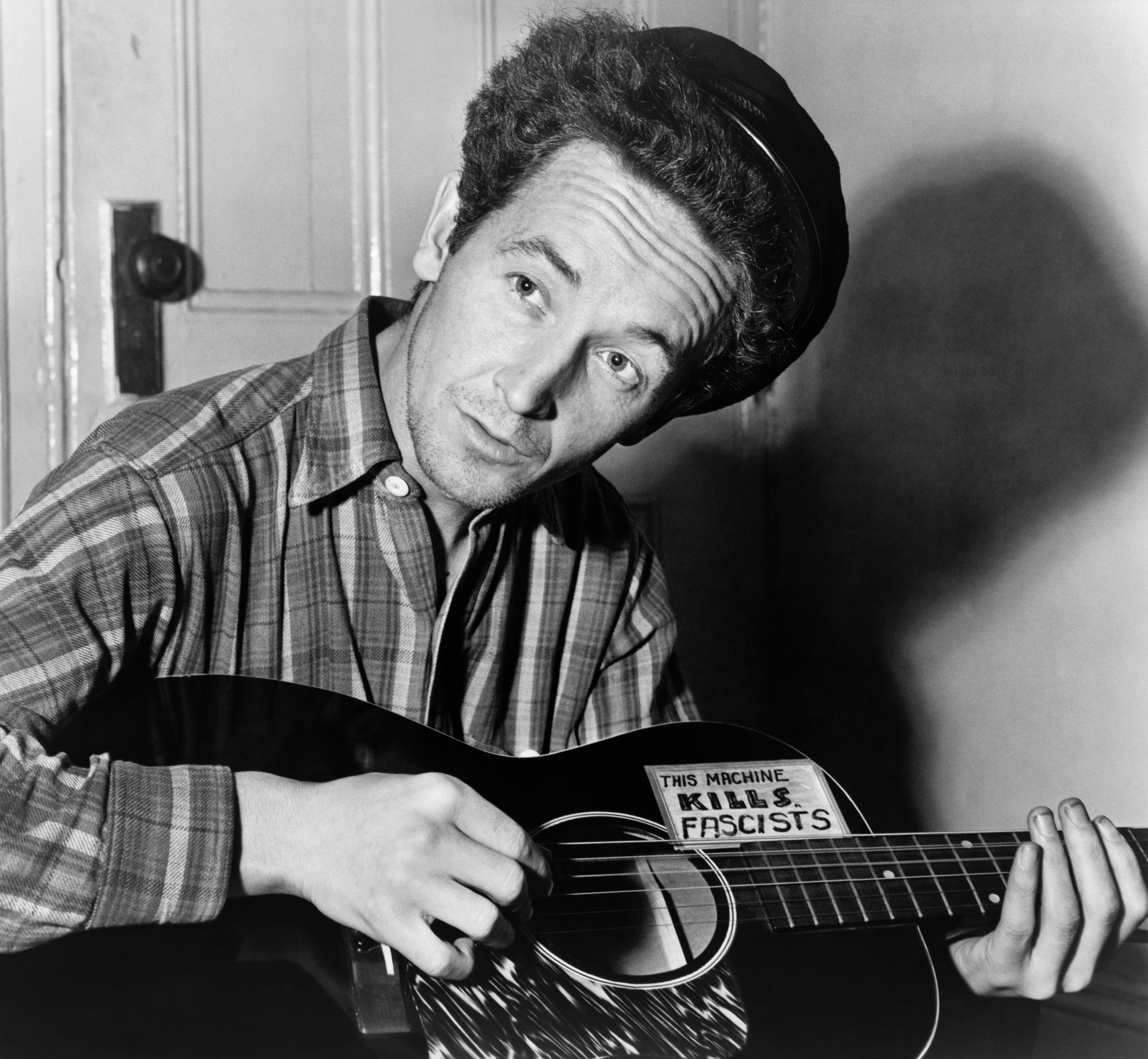
Guthrie in 1943

American singer-songwriter Woody Guthrie's published recordings are culled from a series of recording sessions in the 1940s and 1950s. At the time they were recorded they were not set down for a particular album, so are found over several albums not necessarily in chronological order. The more detailed section on recording sessions lists the song by recording date.

== Selected published discography ==
Year	Album details	Comments
1940	Dust Bowl Ballads: Label: Victor Records	Reissued in 1964 and 2000 by Folkways Records and Buddha Records respectively.
1951	Nursery Days: Label: Folkways Records FC 7675	Reissued in 1992 by Smithsonian Folkways
1956	Songs to Grow on for Mother and Child: Label: Folkways Records FC 7015	Reissued in 1991 by Smithsonian Folkways SFW45035
1956	Bound for Glory: Label: Folkways Records FA 2481	Reissued in 2006 by Smithsonian Folkways FW02481
1960	Ballads of Sacco & Vanzetti: Label: Folkways Records FH 5485	Reissued in 1996 by Smithsonian Folkways SFW40060
1961	Songs To Grow On, Volume 3: This Land Is My Land - American Work Songs: Label: Folkways Records FC 7027	
1962	Woody Guthrie Sings Folk Songs: Label: Folkways Records FA 2483	Reissued in 1989 by Smithsonian Folkways SFW40007
1964	Hard Travelin': Label: Disc Records D-110	
1964	Library of Congress Recordings: Label: Elektra Records EKL-271/272	Reissued in 1988 by Rounder Records
1972	Greatest Songs of Woody Guthrie: Label: Vanguard Records VSD 35/36	
1976	Struggle: Label: Folkways Records FA 2485	Reissued in 1990 by Smithsonian Folkways SFW40025
1987	Columbia River Collection: Label: Rounder Records 1036	
1994	Long Ways to Travel: The Unreleased Folkways Masters, 1944-1949: Label: Smithsonian Folkways SF CD 40046	
1997	This Land Is Your Land, The Asch Recordings, Vol.1: Label: Smithsonian Folkways SFW40100	
1997	Muleskinner Blues, The Asch Recordings, Vol.2: Label: Smithsonian Folkways SFW40101	
1998	Hard Travelin', The Asch Recordings, Vol.3: Label: Smithsonian Folkways SFW40102	
1999	Buffalo Skinners, The Asch Recordings, Vol.4: Label: Smithsonian Folkways SFW40103	
2007	The Live Wire: Woody Guthrie in Performance 1949: Label: Woody Guthrie Foundation	Reissued in 1990 by Rounder Records in 2011
2009	My Dusty Road: Label: Rounder Records	
2012	Woody At 100: The Woody Guthrie Centennial Collection: Label: Smithsonian Folkways SFW40200	

== Recording sessions ==
The list here is organized by recording session and is mostly sourced from the discography put together by Dr. Guy Lodgson in 1990–1991 at the Smithsonian Institution as it appears in the book "Hard Travelin' The Life and Legacy of Woody Guthrie".

- Note: A blank cell below a date indicate that the date is repeated on that row.

=== 1940, Library Of Congress, Washington, D.C., sessions with Alan Lomax ===
Title	Catalogue No.	Recording Date	Notes / Instrument
United States Department of Interior, Radio Broadcasting Division, interviewed by Alan Lomax
Monologue; Boyhood of Woody Guthrie	3407 & 3408	March 21, 1940
The Train (Lost Train Blues)	3407-A		Guitar / Harmonica
Railroad Blues	3407-B		Harmonica
Rye Whiskey	3408-A,B_{1}		Vocals / Guitar
Old Joe Clark	3408-B_{2}		Vocals / Guitar
Beaumont Rag	3408-B_{3}		Vocals / Guitar
Dialogue on the "Green Valley Waltz"	3408-B_{4}
Green Valley Waltz	3409-A		Vocals / Guitar
Monologue on the youth of Woody Guthrie	3409-A,B_{1}
Greenback Dollar	3409-B_{1}		Vocals / Guitar / Harmonies
Boll Weevil Song	3409-B_{2}		Vocals / Guitar / Harmonies
Midnight Special	3410-A_{1}		Vocals / Guitar / Harmonies
Dialogue on Dust Storms	3410-A_{2},B_{1}
So Long, It's Been Good to Know You	3410-B_{2}		Vocals / Guitar
Dialogue on the Dust Bowl	3410-B_{3}
Dialogue on the Dust Bowl, cont.	3411-A_{1}
Talking Dust Bowl Blues	3411-A_{2},B_{1}
Dialogue on Experiences in California	3411-B_{2}
Do-Re-Mi	3411-B_{3}		Vocals /Guitar / Harmonica
Hard Times	3412-A_{1}	March 22, 1940	Vocals / Guitar
Bring Me Back to My Blue Eyed Boy	3412-A_{2}		Vocals / Guitar
Dialogue on Love Songs	3412-A_{3}
Dialogue on Outlaws	3412-B_{1}
Billy the Kid	3412-B_{2}		Vocals / Guitar (Fragment)
Pretty Boy Floyd	3412-B_{3}		Vocals / Guitar
Pretty Boy Floyd, cont	3413-A
Dialogue about Jesse James	3413-B_{1}		Vocals / Guitar
They Laid Jesus Christ in His Grave	3413-B_{2}		Vocals / Guitar
They Laid Jesus Christ in His Grave, cont.	3414-A_{1}		Vocals / Guitar
I'm a Jolly Banker	3414-A_{2}
Dialogue on Bankers	3414-A_{2,3}
I Ain't Got No Home in This World Anymore	3414-A_{3}B_{1}		Vocals / Guitar / Harmonica
Dirty Overhauls	3414-B_{2}		Vocals / Guitar
Dirty Overhauls, cont	3415-A_{1}
'Mary Fagen' and Dialogue	3415-A_{2}B_{1}		Vocals / Guitar
Chain Around My Leg	3415-B_{2}		Vocals / Guitar
Dialogue on the Blues	3416-A_{1}
The Bluest Blues (900 Miles?)	3416-A_{2}
Worried Man Blues	3416-B_{1}		Vocals / Guitar
Church House Blues - Lonesome Valley	3416-B_{2}		Vocals / Guitar
Dialogue on Walking Railroad Ties	3416-B_{2}
Monologue Railroads and Men Out of Work	3417-A
Railroad Line Blues	3417-B_{1}		Vocals / Guitar
Goin' Down the Frisco Line	3417-B_{2}		Vocals / Guitar
I'm Goin' Down the Road Feelin' Bad	3418-A_{1}		Vocals / Guitar
Seven Cent Cotton	3418-A_{2}		Vocals / Guitar (fragment)
Wagon Yard Blues	3418-A_{3}		Vocals / Guitar (fragment)
Dust Bowl Refugees	3418-B_{1}		Vocals / Guitar
Dialogue about man going to California for contract work	3418-B_{2}
Dialogue about man going to California for contract work, cont.	3419-A
Great Dust Storm (Dust Storm Disaster) and dialogue	3419-B_{1}		Vocals / Guitar
I'm Sittin' on the Foggy Mountain Top	3419-B_{2}		Vocals / Guitar
Story Of Oil Booms and Dust Storms	3420-A_{1}	March 27, 1940
Dust Pneumonia Blues	3420-A_{2}		Vocals / Guitar
Dust Bowl Blues	3420-B_{1}		Vocals / Guitar
Dialogue about California	3420-B_{1}
California Blues	3420-B_{2}		Vocals / Guitar
Dialogue about Jimmy Rogers and "California Blues"	3421-A
Do-Re-Mi	3421-B_{1}		Vocals / Guitar
Living conditions in California	3421-B_{1}
Dust Bowl Refugees	3422-A		Vocals / Guitar
Dialogue about Okies in California, Pride in Oklahoma, and Wil Rogers	3422-B_{1}
Highway 66 / Wil Rogers Highway	3423-A_{1}		Vocals / Guitar
New Years Flood	3423-A_{2}		Vocals / Guitar
Songs by Woody Guthrie and Guitar, Recorded in the Phonoduplication Studio by Alan Lomax and John Langenegger
Stewball	4491-A_{1}	Jan 4 1941	Vocals / Guitar
Stagolee	4491-A_{2}		Vocals / Guitar
One Dime Blues	4491-A_{3}		Vocals / Guitar
Woopie Ti Yi Yo, Git Along Little Doggies	4491-B_{1}		Vocals / Guitar
Trail To Mexico	4491-B_{2}		Vocals / Guitar (fragment)
The Gypsy Davy	4491-B_{3}		Vocals / Guitar
There is a House in this Old Town	4491-B_{4}		Vocals / Guitar

=== American Studio of the Air, Radio Show ===
Title	Catalogue No.	Recording Date	Notes / Instrument
Boll Weevil	Library of Congress (LOC) 4507A4	April 2, 1940	Harmonica / Vocals / Guitar with the Golden Gate Quartet
It's Hard on We Poor Farmers	LOC 4507A3		Harmonica / Alan Lomax on Guitar & Vocals
Train Blues	LOC 4508A1		Harmonica
So Long, It's Been Good to Know You	LOC 4508A2		Harmonica / Vocals / Alan Lomax on Guitar
Talking Dust Storm	LOC 4508A3		Vocals Guitar

=== 1940, RCA Victor Sessions, Dust Bowl Ballads ===
Title	Catalogue No.	Recording Date	Notes / Instrument
*The Great Dust Storm ("Dust Storm Disaster")	(26622-A) BS-050145-1	April 26, 1940	Guitar
*Talking Dust Bowl Blues	(26619-A) BS-050146-2		Guitar
Dust Pnemunonia Blues	(26623-B) BS-050147-1		Guitar
*Dusty Old Dust ("So Long, It's Been Good to Know You")	(26622-B) BS-050148-1		Guitar
Dust Bowl Blues	LPV-502, BS-050149-1		Guitar
*Blowin Down This Road ("I Ain't Gonna Be Treated This Way")	(26619-B) BS-050150-1		Guitar / Harmonica
*Tom Joad pt 1	(26621-A) BS-050151-1		Guitar / Harmonica
*Tom Joad pt 2	(26621-B) BS-050152-1		Guitar
Do Re Mi	(26620-A) BS-050153-1		Guitar
*Dust Bowl Refugee	(26623-A) BS-050154-1		Guitar / Harmonica
I Ain't Got No Home in This World Anymore	(26624-A) BS-050155-1		Guitar / Harmonica
"Vigilante Man"	(26624-B) BS-050156-1		Guitar / Harmonica
*Dust Can't Kill Me	(26620-B) BS-050600-1		Guitar / Harmonica
Pretty Boy Floyd	LPV 502, BS-050601-1		Guitar

* These recording were released on the record Talking Dust Bowl on Folkways Records in 1950 by Moe Asch, but without RCA's licences. All these recordings were made by RCA Records in 1940 and released on the albums Dust Bowl Ballads vol 1 and 2. These records have been subsequently reissued in 1964 and 1977.

=== 1941, Bonneville Power Administration, The Columbia River Songs ===
The masters of this session were lost, but a collection of 6 discs was collected from BPA employee copies from the time. Most were eventually released on Rounder Records Woody Guthrie, Columbia River Collection C1036 in 1987. The 6 discs are housed in the National Archives, Washington D.C. The catalogue numbers here relate to National Archive listings.

Title	Catalogue No.	Recording Date	Notes / Instrument
Pastures of Plenty	305.01	May 1941	Vocals / Guitar
The Biggest Thing Man Has Ever Done	305.01		Vocals / Guitar
Roll Columbia, Roll	305.01		Vocals / Guitar
Washington Talkin' Blues	305.02		Vocals / Guitar
The Biggest Thing Man Has Ever Done	305.02		Vocals / Guitar
Ramblin' Blues (Portland Town)	305.03		Vocals / Guitar
It Takes a Married Man to Sing A Worried Song	305.03		Vocals / Guitar
Song of the Grand Coulee Dam ("Way Up in That Northwest")	305.03		Vocals / Guitar
Roll On, Columbia	305.04		Vocals / Guitar
The Grand Coulee Dam	305.04		Vocals / Guitar
Jackhammer Blues	305.05		Vocals / Guitar
The Grand Coulee Dam	305.05		Vocals / Guitar
Columbia Waters	305.05		Vocals / Guitar
Talking Columbia Blues	305.05		Vocals / Guitar

=== Unissued LOC Recordings: Home Disc Recordings & 1941 Almanac Singers ===
Series of Discs for the Library of Congress, recorded by the Almanac Singers, only those written by or featuring Woody Guthrie are included here. Notes are Woody's parts.

Title	Catalogue No.	Recording Date	Notes / Instrument
Round and Round Hitler's Grave	6100-B	February 1942	Guitar
Hulaballobalay	6101-A		Guitar
Taking it Easy	6101-B		Guitar
Biggest Thing Man Has Ever Done	6102-B		Guitar / Vocals
High Cost of Living	6103-A		Guitar
Sinking of the Ruben James	6103-B		Guitar
Goin' Down the Road Feelin' Bad	6105-A		Guitar
Pretty Boy Floyd	4793-A	August 1941	Vocals

=== Keynote Recordings ===
Title	Catalogue No.	Recording Date	Notes / Instrument
Song for Bridges	QB 1548	June 1941	Guitar / Vocals
* Babe O' Mine	QB 1549		Guitar / Vocals
* Boomtown Bill	x-5000	June 1942
* Keep That Oil a Rollin'	QB 1548	June 1942	Vocals

* Songs that have been released on Songs for Political Action, Bear Family Records BCD 15270

=== General Records ===
Title	Catalogue No.	Recording Date	Notes / Instrument
Blow Ye Winds, Heigh Ho	5015-A, R-4160	July 1941
Away Rio	5017-A, R-4161		Harmonica
Blow the Man Down	5016-A, R-4162		Vocals
The Golden Vanity	5017-B, R-4174		Harmonica
The Coast of Old Barbary	5015-B, R-4176		Harmonica
Haul Away Joe	5015-B, R-4176
House of the Rising Sun	5020-B, R-4163
Ground Hog	5018-B, R-4164
State of Arkansas	5019-B, R-4165
I Ride an Old Paint	5020-A, R-4169		Vocals / Guitar
Hard Ain't It Hard	5019-B, R-4170		Harmonica
The Dodger Song	5018-A, R-4171		Harmonica
The Weavers Song	R-4168
Greenland Fishing	R-4172

=== The Martins and the Coys: A Contemporary Folk Tale ===
Recorded by Decca Records in March 1944, and written by Elizabeth Lomax. Alan Lomax shopped this around but no stations were interested, eventually being sold to the BBC. The recordings included Woody as well as several members of the Almanac singers.

Title	Catalogue No.	Recording Date	Notes / Instrument
You Better Get Ready		March 1944	Vocal / Guitar w/Sonny Terry on Harmonica
You Fascists Are Bound to Lose			Vocal / Guitar w/Sonny Terry on Harmonica
Bound for the Mountains			Group Vocals
Run Boys Run
Black is the Color of My True Love's Hair
On Top of Old Smokey
Gonna Take Everybody (All Work Together)
When We March Into Berlin
How Many Biscuts Can You Eat?
Smokey Mountain Girls
Turtle Dove
Round and Round Hitler's Grave
The Martins and the Coys

=== 1944 and 1945, The Asch Recordings ===
Possibly Guthrie's most famous recordings, conducted over a series of days by Moses "Moe" Asch in 1944 and 1945. They were issued on a variety of labels under Asch, Asch-Stinson, Asch-Signature-Stinson, Disc, Folkways and Verve/Folkways.

Title	Catalogue No.	Recording Date	Notes / Instrument
Hard Ain't It Hard	LM-1	April 16, 1944
More Pretty Girls Than One	LM-2
Golden Vanity	MA 1	April 19, 1944	Recordings on this date w/ Cisco Houston
When the Yanks Go Marching In	MA 2
So Long, It's Been Good to Know You	MA3
Dollar Down Dollar a Week	MA4
Hen Cackle	MA5
I Ain't Got Nobody	MA6
Ida Red	MA7
Columbus Stockade	MA8
Whistle Blowing	MA9
John Henry	MA10
Hammer Ring ("Union Hammer")	MA11
Muleskinner Blues ("New Road Line")	MA12
What are We Waiting On ("Great and Bloody Fight")	LM-2
More Pretty Girls Than One	MA13
Ship in the Sky ("My Daddy")	MA14
The Biggest Thing Man Has Ever Done	MA15
Stewball	MA16
Grand Coulee Dam	MA17
Talking Sailor ("Talking Merchant Marine")	MA18
Talking Sailor ("Talking Merchant Marine")	MA19
Talking Sailor ("Talking Merchant Marine")	MA20
New York Town ("My Town")	MA21
Talking Sailor ("Talking Merchant Marine")	MA22
Reckless Talk	MA23
Reckless Talk	MA24
Last Nickel Blues	MA25
Guitar Rag	MA26
Who's Gonna Shoe Your Pretty Little Feet ("Don't Need No Man")	MA27
(Those) Brown Eyes	MA28
Chisholm Trail	MA29
Sowing on the Mountains	MA30
Sowing on the Mountains	MA31
Right Now	MA32
Train-Harmonica	MA33
Sally Don't You Grieve	MA34
Take a Wiff on Me	MA35
Philadelphia Lawyer	MA36
Kissing On ("Gave Her Kisses")	MA37
Little Darling	MA38
Baltimore to Washington ("Troubles Too")	MA39
Poor Boy	MA40
Poor Boy	MA41
Ain't Nobody's Business	MA42
Take Me Back Babe	MA43
Goin' Down the Road Feelin' Bad ("Lonesome Road Blues")	MA44
Bed on the Floor	MA45
One Big Union ("Join It Yourself")	MA46
Worried Man Blues	MA47
What Did the Deep Say?	MA48
Foggy Mountain Top	MA49
21 Years	MA50
Roving Gambler ("Gambling Man")	MA51
Cindy	MA52
Into Season	MA53
Red River Valley	MA55
Dead or Alive ("Poor Lazarus")	MA56
Pretty Boy	MA57
John Hardy	MA58
Bad Lee Brown ("Cocaine Blues")	MA59
Whistle Blowing	MA66
Billy The Kid	MA67
"Stagger Lee"	MA68
Down Yonder	674	April 20, 1944
Guitar Blues	675
Harmonica Breakdown	676
Fox Chase	677
Train	678
Lost John	679
Pretty Baby	680
Old Dog a Bone	681
"Turkey in the Straw"	687
Give Me That Old-Time Religion	688
Glory ("Walk and Talk with Jesus")	689
Hard Time Blues	690
Bus Blues	691
Devilish Mary	692
Cripple Creek	693
Sandy Land	694
Old Dan Tucker	695	April 24, 1944
Bile Them Cabbage Down	696
Old Joe Clark	697
Buffalo Girls	698
Rain Crow Bill	699
Skip to My Lou	700
Lonesome Train	701, 702
Blues, Harmonica Breakdown	703, 704
Harmonica Rag	705,706
Crawdad Hole	707
Bury Me Beneath the Willow	708
I Ride an Old Paint	709
Blue Eyes	710
Going Down the Road Feeling Bad ("Lonesome Road Blues")	711
Old Dog a Bone	712
Having Fun	713
Blues	714
Talking Fishing Blues	MA75	April 25, 1944
Talking Sailor ("Talking Merchant Marine")	MA76
Union Burial Ground	MA77
Jesse James	MA78
Rangers Command	MA79
Sinking of the Ruben James	MA80
Put My Little Shoes Away	MA81
Picture From Life's Other Side	MA82
Will You Miss Me	MA83
Bed on the Floor	MA84
900 Miles	MA85
Sourwood Mountain	MA86
Hoecake Baking	MA87
Ezekiel Saw the Wheel	MA88
Little Darling	MA89
Lonesome Day	MA90
Cumberland Gap	MA91
Fiddling Piece	MA92
"Carry Me Back to Old Virginny"	MA93
Step Stone	MA94
"House of the Rising Sun"	MA96
Browns Ferry Blues	MA98
What Would You Give in Exchange For Your Soul?	MA99
When That Great Ship Went Down	MA99-1
Dust Bowl	MA100
Guitar Rag	MA101
I Ain't Got Nobody	MA102
Going Down This Road Feeling Bad ("Lonesome Road Blues")	MA103
Polly Wolly Doodle	MA104
Guitar Rag	1230
Blowin' Down This Old Dusty Road	1231
Hey Lolly Lolly	MA105
Budded Roses	MA106
"House of the Rising Sun"	MA107
I Don't Feel at Home in the Bowery	MA108
Hobo's Lullaby	MA109
Frog Went A-Courting	MA110
Bad Reputation	MA111
Snow Deer	MA112
Ladies Auxiliary	MA113
"This Land Is Your Land"	MA114
Hang Knot ("Slip Knot")	MA115
Breakdown	MA116
Go Tell Aunt Rhody	MA117
Union Going to Roll	MA118
Who Broke the Lock on the Hen House Door	MA119
What Did the Deep Sea Say	MA120
Strawberry Roan	MA121-1
When the Yanks Go Marching in	MA122-1
Bed on the Floor	MA123-1
We Shall Be Free	MA124-1
Right Now	MA125-1
Jackhammer John	MA126-1
Woody	MA127-1,127-2
Keep Your Skillit Good and Greasy	MA129-1
Home	MA130-1
Lost You	MA131
Slip Knot ("Hang Knot")	MA134
Jesus Christ	MA135
Hobo Bill	MA136
Little Black Train	MA137
Cannon Ball	MA138
Gypsy Davy	MA139
Bile Them Cabbage Down	MA140
Woody	MA1240	May 8, 1944
Get Along Little Dogies	860	March 1, 1945
Waltz	861,862
Union Breakdown	863
Cackling Hen	864
Chisholm Trail	865
Bed on Your Floor	866
Rye Whiskey	867
Old Joe Clark	868	March 23, 1945
Long Way to France	869
Woody Blues	870
Down Yonder	871
Gal I Left Behind	872
Mean Talking Blues	900	May 24, 1945
"1913 Massacre"	901
Ludlow Massacre	902
Buffalo Skinners	903
Harriet Tubman	904,905

Many recordings have unknown session dates. These are included in a list available at the United States Library of Congress titled "Surviving Recordings in the Smithsonian Folklife Archive Made by Woody Guthrie for Moses Asch". Moe Asch says Woody's kids song were recorded sometime in early 1947 and the Sacco and Vanzetti ballads were recorded January 1947.

=== 1947 Songs to Grow On ===
The recording dates for the Songs to Grow On series of children's song are mostly lost due to the record keeping of Moe Asch, but the tracks are included here as they are some of Guthrie's most well known tracks. In this case the Date is the release date of the original 78 records.

Title	Catalogue No.	Recording Date	Notes / Instrument
Songs to Grow On: Nursery Days issued 1947,1950,1951
Wake Up	5050A (D301)	1947
Clean-O	5050B (D302)
Dance Around	5051A (D304)
Put Your Finger in the Air	5051B (D303)
Don't Push Me	5052A (D305)
Jig Along Home	5052B (D306)
My Dolly	F52B1
Come See	F52B2
Race You Down the Mountain	F53A1
Pick it up	F53A2
Merry Go Round	F53B1
Sleepy Eyes	F53B2

== Honors ==
On September 6, 2007, Woody Guthrie Publications, Inc., in cooperation with the Woody Guthrie Foundation released The Live Wire: Woody Guthrie in Performance 1949, accompanied by a 72-page book describing the performance and the project. Paul Braverman, a student at Rutgers University in 1949, made the recordings himself using a small wire recorder at a Guthrie concert in Newark, New Jersey.[10] On February 10, 2008, the release was the recipient of a Grammy Award in the category Best Historical Album.[11]
