= The Asch Recordings =

Compilation album by Woody Guthrie
- Released: 1997–1999
- Recorded: 1944–1949
- Genre: Folk; Americana; country
- Label: Smithsonian Folkways
- Producer: Moe Asch

Woody Guthrie chronology
The Columbia River Collection (1944)	The Asch Recordings (1997)	Ballads of Sacco & Vanzetti (1947)

The Asch Recordings, recorded between 1944 and 1949, are a series of albums featuring some of the most famous recordings of US folk musician Woody Guthrie. These sessions were recorded by Moses "Moe" Asch in New York City.

== Background ==
The songs recorded by Asch comprise the bulk of Guthrie's original material and several traditional songs. They were issued on a variety of labels over the years under the labels Asch, Asch-Stinson, Asch-Signature-Stinson, Disc, Folkways and Smithsonian Folkways. The tracks for Guthrie's Songs to Grow on for Mother and Child and Nursery Days were from these sessions.

Many recordings have unknown session dates. These are included in a list available at the United States Library of Congress titled "Surviving Recordings in the Smithsonian Folklife Archive Made by Woody Guthrie for Moses Asch". Moe Asch says Woody's kids songs were recorded sometime in early 1947 and the Sacco and Vanzetti ballads were recorded January 1947.

== Folkways volumes ==
Professional ratings
Review scores
Source	Rating
Allmusic Volume 1	5/5 stars
Allmusic Volume 2	4.5/5 stars
Allmusic Volume 3	5/5 stars
Allmusic Volume 4	4.5/5 stars

The Smithsonian Folkways label repackaged and arranged these sessions in a series of 4 discs between 1997 and 1999. The first volume focuses on Guthrie's original compositions, the second on folk and country covers, the third on topical songs, and the fourth on cowboy and western music.

Year	Title	Record label
1997	This Land Is Your Land, The Asch Recordings, Vol.1	Smithsonian Folkways
1997	Muleskinner Blues, The Asch Recordings, Vol.2	Smithsonian Folkways
1998	Hard Travelin', The Asch Recordings, Vol.3	Smithsonian Folkways
1999	Buffalo Skinners, The Asch Recordings, Vol.4	Smithsonian Folkways

== List of songs ==
- Note: A blank cell below a date indicates that the date is repeated on that row.

Title	Catalogue No.	Recording Date	Notes / Instrument
"Hard Ain't It Hard"	LM-1	April 16, 1944	
"More Pretty Girls Than One"	LM-2		
"Golden Vanity"	MA 1	April 19, 1944	Recordings on this date w/ Cisco Houston
"When the Yanks Go Marching In"	MA 2		
So Long, It's Been Good to Know You	MA3		
Dollar Down Dollar a Week	MA4		
Hen Cackle	MA5		
I Ain't Got Nobody	MA6		
Ida Red	MA7		
Columbus Stockade	MA8		
Whistle Blowing	MA9		
John Henry	MA10		
Hammer Ring ("Union Hammer")	MA11		
Muleskinner Blues ("New Road Line")	MA12		
What are We Waiting On ("Bloody Fight")	LM-2		
More Pretty Girls Than One	MA13		
Ship in the Sky ("My Daddy")	MA14		
The Biggest Thing Man Has Ever Done	MA15		
Stewball	MA16		
Grand Coulee Dam	MA17		
Talking Sailor ("Talking Merchant Marine")	MA18		
Talking Sailor ("Talking Merchant Marine")	MA19		
Talking Sailor ("Talking Merchant Marine")	MA20		
New York Town ("My Town")	MA21		
Talking Sailor ("Talking Merchant Marine")	MA22		
Reckless Talk	MA23		
Reckless Talk	MA24		
Last Nickel Blues	MA25		
Guitar Rag	MA26		
Who's Gonna Shoe Your Pretty Little Feet ("Don't Need No Man")	MA27		
(Those) Brown Eyes	MA28		
Chisholm Trail	MA29		
Sowing on the Mountains	MA30		
Sowing on the Mountains	MA31		
Right Now	MA32		
Train-Harmonica	MA33		
Sally Don't You Grieve	MA34		
Take a Wiff on Me	MA35		
Philadelphia Lawyer	MA36		
Kissing On ("Gave Her Kisses")	MA37		
Little Darling	MA38		
Baltimore to Washington ("Troubles Too")	MA39		
Poor Boy	MA40		
Poor Boy	MA41		
Ain't Nobody's Business	MA42		
Take Me Back Babe	MA43		
Goin' Down the Road Feelin' Bad ("Lonesome Road Blues")	MA44		
Bed on the Floor	MA45		
One Big Union ("Join It Yourself")	MA46		
Worried Man Blues	MA47		
What Did the Deep Say?	MA48		
Foggy Mountain Top	MA49		
21 Years	MA50		
Roving Gambler ("Gambling Man")	MA51		
Cindy	MA52		
Into Season	MA53		
Red River Valley	MA55		
Dead or Alive ("Poor Lazarus")	MA56		
Pretty Boy	MA57		
John Hardy	MA58		
Bad Lee Brown ("Cocaine Blues")	MA59		
Whistle Blowing	MA66		
Billy The Kid	MA67		
Stagger Lee	MA68		
Down Yonder	674	April 20, 1944	
Guitar Blues	675		
Harmonica Breakdown	676		
Fox Chase	677		
Train	678		
Lost John	679		
Pretty Baby	680		
Old Dog a Bone	681		
Turkey in the Straw	687		
Give Me That Old Time Religion	688		
Glory ("Walk and Talk with Jesus")	689		
Hard Time Blues	690		
Bus Blues	691		
Devilish Mary	692		
Cripple Creek	693		
Sandy Land	694		
Old Dan Tucker	695	April 24, 1944	
Bile Them Cabbage Down	696		
Old Joe Clark	697		
Buffalo Girls	698		
Rain Crow Bill	699		
Skip to my Lou	700		
Lonesome Train	701, 702		
Blues, Harmonica Breakdown	703, 704		
Harmonica Rag	705,706		
Crawdad Hole	707		
Bury Me Beneath the Willow	708		
I Ride an Old Paint	709		
Blue Eyes	710		
Going Down the Road Feeling Bad ("Lonesome Road Blues")	711		
Old Dog a Bone	712		
Having Fun	713		
Blues	714		
Talking Fishing Blues	MA75	April 25, 1944	
Talking Sailor ("Talking Merchant Marine")	MA76		
Union Burial Ground	MA77		
Jesse James	MA78		
Rangers Command	MA79		
Sinking of the Ruben James	MA80		
Put My Little Shoes Away	MA81		
Picture From Life's Other Side	MA82		
Will You Miss Me	MA83		
Bed on the Floor	MA84		
900 Miles	MA85		
Sourwood Mountain	MA86		
Hoecake Baking	MA87		
Ezekiel Saw the Wheel	MA88		
Little Darling	MA89		
Lonesome Day	MA90		
Cumberland Gap	MA91		
Fiddling Piece	MA92		
Carry Me Back to Old Virginny	MA93		
Step Stone	MA94		
House of the Rising Sun	MA96		
Browns Ferry Blues	MA98		
What Would You Give in Exchange For Your Soul?	MA99		
When That Ship Went Down	MA99-1		
Dust Bowl	MA100		
Guitar Rag	MA101		
I Ain't Got Nobody	MA102		
Going Down This Road Feeling Bad ("Lonesome Road Blues")	MA103		
Polly Wolly Doodle	MA104		
Guitar Rag	1230		
Blowin' Down This Old Dusty Road	1231		
Hey Lolly Lolly	MA105		
Budded Roses	MA106		
House of the Rising Sun	MA107		
I Don't Feel at Home in the Bowery	MA108		
Hobo's Lullaby	MA109		
Froggy Went a Courtin'	MA110		
Bad Reputation	MA111		
Snow Deer	MA112		
Ladies Auxiliary	MA113		
This Land is Your Land	MA114		
Hang Knot ("Slip Knot")	MA115		
Breakdown	MA116		
Go Tell Aunt Rhody	MA117		
Union Going to Roll	MA118		
Who Broke the Lock on the Hen House Door	MA119		
What Did the Deep Sea Say	MA120		
Strawberry Roan	MA121-1		
When the Yanks Go Marching in	MA122-1		
Bed on the Floor	MA123-1		
We Shall Be Free	MA124-1		
Right Now	MA125-1		
Jackhammer John	MA126-1		
Woody	MA127-1,127-2		
Keep Your Skillit Good and Greasy	MA129-1		
Home	MA130-1		
Lost You	MA131		
Slip Knot ("Hang Knot")	MA134		
Jesus Christ	MA135		
Hobo Bill	MA136		
Little Black Train	MA137		
Cannon Ball	MA138		
Gypsy Davy	MA139		
Bile Them Cabbage Down	MA140		
Woody	MA1240	May 8, 1944	
Get Along Little Dogies	860	March 1, 1945	
Waltz	861,862		
Union Breakdown	863		
Cackling Hen	864		
Chishom Trail	865		
Bed on Your Floor	866		
Rye Whiskey	867		
Old Joe Clark	868	March 23, 1945	
Long Way to France	869		
Woody Blues	870		
Down Yonder	871		
Gal I Left Behind	872		
Mean Talking Blues	900	May 24, 1945	
1913 Massacre	901		
Ludlow Massacre	902		
Buffalo Skinners	903		
Harriet Tubman	904,905		
Lindbergh	106		
