= Bound for Glory =

Bound for Glory may refer to:

- Bound for Glory (book), a 1943 autobiography by Woody Guthrie
  - Bound for Glory (album), a 1956 album by Woody Guthrie and Will Geer
  - Bound for Glory (1976 film), a 1976 film based on the book, starring David Carradine
- Bound for Glory (1975 film), a Canadian drama film
- Bound for Glory (TV series), a 2005 American sports documentary series
- "Bound for Glory" (song), a 1990 song by Angry Anderson
- "Bound for Glory", a tribute song for Woody Guthrie by Phil Ochs from his 1964 album All the News That's Fit to Sing
- Bound for Glory, a 1995 EP by Fat Day
- TNA Bound for Glory, a professional wrestling pay-per-view event produced by Total Nonstop Action Wrestling; the promotion's flagship marquee event
