= Woody at 100: The Woody Guthrie Centennial Collection =

Compilation album by Woody Guthrie
- Released: July 10, 2012
- Recorded: 1937–1951
- Genre: Folk; Americana
- Length: 199:08
- Label: Smithsonian Folkways
- Producer: Jeff Place, Robert Santelli

Woody At 100: The Woody Guthrie Centennial Collection is a 150-page large-format book with three CDs containing 57 tracks, including Woody Guthrie's most important recordings such as the complete version of "This Land Is Your Land," "Pretty Boy Floyd," "I Ain't Got No Home in This World Anymore," and "Riding in My Car." The set also contains 21 previously unreleased performances and six never-before-heard original songs, including Woody's first known—and recently discovered—recordings. It is an in-depth commemorative collection of songs, photos and essays released by Smithsonian Folkways in June 2012.

== Compilation and release ==
Robert Santelli, CEO of the Grammy Museum, contacted Jeff Place in October 2010 and suggested they compile a Guthrie box set to go along with the celebration of Guthrie's 100th birthday. Santelli and Place looked for the most important and representative of Guthrie's compositions. They also included the earliest known recordings of Guthrie (made in 1939), which were discovered by researcher Peter LaChapelle in 1999.

== Design ==
The design for Woody at 100: The Woody Guthrie Centennial Collection was created by Visual Dialogue, a graphic design company from Boston, Massachusetts. The firm based the collection's design on the plain typography and simple design of classic Folkways Records albums. The box set consists of a 150-page hardcover textbook containing Guthrie essays, sketches, and photographs. Three pockets hold CDs in the last pages of the book.

== Reception ==
Woody at 100 currently holds a 92/100 rating from aggregate review site Metacritic.

Rolling Stone critic David Fricke wrote, "This sumptuous birthday celebration of America's greatest folk singer is really a present to us: two CDs of his greatest songs and recordings, mostly from the mid-1940s, and a disc of illuminating rarities."

Rachel Maddux of Pitchfork wrote, "in the world of Woody at 100, everything about Guthrie's career seems fluid, boundaryless, as if considering him just as a great American musician and not also as a man of letters and a painter, too, has maybe been a huge mistake."

Professional ratings
Aggregate scores
Source	Rating
Metacritic	92/100
Review scores
Source	Rating
AllMusic	4/5 stars
The Austin Chronicle	3/5 stars
The A.V. Club	B+
Entertainment Weekly	A−
Mojo	5/5 stars
Pitchfork	8.5/10
PopMatters	10/10
Rolling Stone	4.5/5 stars
Uncut	4.5/5 stars
Under the Radar	9/10

== Track listing ==
=== Disc 1 ===
1. This Land Is Your Land (Alternate Version)
2. Pastures of Plenty
3. Riding in My Car (Car Song)
4. The Grand Coulee Dam
5. Talking Dust Bowl
6. So Long, It's Been Good to Know Yuh (Dusty Old Dust)
7. Ramblin' Round
8. Philadelphia Lawyer
9. Hard Travelin'
10. Pretty Boy Floyd
11. Hobo's Lullaby
12. Talking Columbia
13. The Sinking of the Reuben James
14. Jesus Christ
15. Gypsy Davy
16. New York Town
17. Going Down the Road (Feeling Bad)
18. Hard, Ain't It Hard
19. The Biggest Thing That Man Has Ever Done (The Great Historical Bum)
20. This Land Is Your Land (Standard Version)
21. Jarama Valley
22. Why, Oh Why?
23. I've Got to Know

=== Disc 2 ===
1. Better World A-Comin'
2. When That Great Ship Went Down (The Great Ship)
3. A Dollar Down and a Dollar a Week
4. Talking Centralia
5. 1913 Massacre
6. Dirty Overalls
7. My Daddy (Flies a Ship in the Sky)
8. Worried Man Blues
9. Hangknot, Slipknot
10. Buffalo Skinners
11. Howdi Do
12. Jackhammer John
13. The Ranger's Command
14. So Long, It's Been Good to Know You (WWII Version)
15. What Are We Waiting On?
16. Lindbergh
17. Ludlow Massacre
18. Bad Lee Brown (Cocaine Blues)
19. Two Good Men
20. Farmer-Labor Train
21. The Jolly Banker
22. We Shall Be Free

=== Disc 3 ===
1. I Ain't Got No Home (In This World Anymore)
2. Them Big City Ways
3. Do Re Mi
4. Skid Row Serenade
5. Radio Program: The Ballad Gazette With Woody Guthrie [This Land Is Your Land; What Did the Deep Sea Say?; Blow Ye Winds; Trouble on the Waters; Blow the Man Down; Normandy Was Her Name; The Sinking of the Reuben James]
6. BBC: Children's Hour July 7, 1944 [Intro – Wabash Cannonball; 900 Miles; Stagger Lee; Pretty Boy Floyd]
7. People's Songs Hootenanny [Ladies Auxiliary; Weaver's Life]
8. WNYC Radio Program: Folk Songs of America December 12, 1940 [John Hardy; Jesse James; Tom Joad]
9. Reckless Talk
10. All Work Together
11. My Little Seed
12. Goodnight Little Cathy

== Credits ==
- Production: Jeff Place, Robert Santelli
- Liner Notes: Jeff Place, Robert Santelli, Peter LaChapelle, Guy W. Logsdon
- Audio restoration: Pete Reiniger, Eric Conn, Joe Gastwirt, David Glasser, Mickey Hart, Charlie Pilzer, LeAnn Sonenstein
- Compilation Mastered By: Pete Reiniger
- Executive producers: Daniel E. Sheehy and D.A. Sonneborn
- Fact-checking, Proofreading: Tiffany Colannino, Ezra Deutsch-Feldman, Evangeline Mee, Kathryn Mitchell, and Emily Shinay
- Production Manager: Mary Monseur
- Mastering: Pete Reiniger
- Art Direction & Design: Visual Dialogue

== Awards ==
Woody at 100: The Woody Guthrie Centennial Collection received two 2013 GRAMMY nominations, winning in the category of Best Boxed Set or Limited Edition Package. The box set also won Independent Music Awards for Best Compilation Album and Best Album Packaging as well as an American Association of Independent Music Libby Award for Creative Packaging.
