= So Long, It's Been Good to Know Yuh =

Song with lyrics by Woody Guthrie

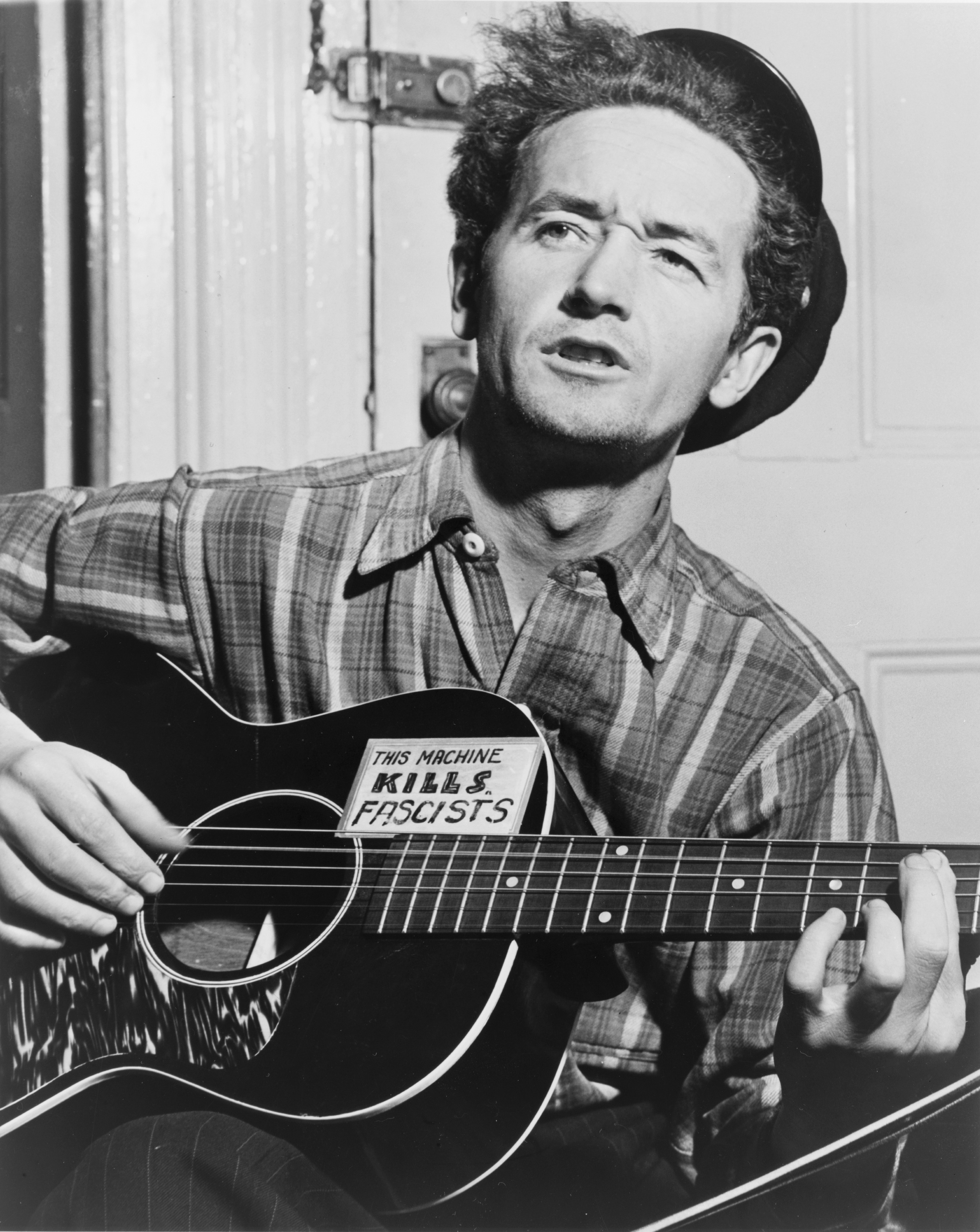
Woody Guthrie, pictured in 1943

"So Long, It's Been Good to Know Yuh" (originally titled "Dusty Old Dust") is a song by American folk musician Woody Guthrie released as part of his album Dust Bowl Ballads. The composition is considered one of Guthrie's best songs, defining his style, and demonstrating his "increasing comfort with writing topical songs about the poor and downtrodden". It has been categorized as a "Dust Bowl ballad" by music critics. The song was also included in the Library of Congress Recordings from 1940 made by Guthrie and Alan Lomax.

== Music and lyrics ==
The song was based on music used in Carson Robison's "Ballad of Billy the Kid" of the 1930s, which Guthrie slightly modified, adding new lyrics. It is written in a 3/4 time signature and has four-part harmony.

The composition tells about the hard times that Americans experienced during the Great Depression, especially the "harsh weather and drought conditions" experienced by farm workers in the Western United States. Guthrie himself had lived in the town of Pampa, Texas, and had witnessed the devastating Black Sunday dust storm of April 14, 1935. Pampa is located in Gray County, Texas, referenced in the lyrics "In the month called April, county called Gray."

The repetitive chorus has been described as "a witty, black retort, utterly negative and apocalyptic": "We talked of the end of the world, and then/We'd sing a song an' then sing it again/We'd sit for an hour an' not say a word/And then these words would be heard:/So long, it's been good to know yuh".

Guthrie also wrote a version of the song with alternate lyrics about serving in the Second World War.

== Commercial success ==
Although the song had a limited success during its 1930s release by Guthrie, its popularity soared in 1951 when it was published by Howard S. Richmond's music publishing company Folkways Music Publishers, Inc., and promoted to major record labels, landing a recorded version by The Weavers with different verses. The song peaked at number four on the pop music charts in 1951, and became known as one of the Weavers' "staple" tunes.

== Cover versions ==
The Weavers released a cover of this song.

The song was occasionally used as a closing song on the variety show A Prairie Home Companion, usually with additional comical verses written by the host Garrison Keillor.

The band X recorded a version on their 1988 album Live at the Whisky a Go Go on the Fabulous Sunset Strip.

It was also a popular (often closing) number for Liverpool folk group The Spinners.

The song has been used during the 2020 coronavirus pandemic period as the closing song on the Old Crow Medicine Show's online weekly variety program "Hartland Hootenanny".

== Popular culture ==
In the TV series M*A*S*H, in the episode "Mr. and Mrs. Who?" (Season 8, Episode 9, original airdate November 12, 1979), Hawkeye Pierce asks Father Mulcahy to play the song on the piano as they un-do a drunken wedding ceremony for Major Winchester.

On the last day of his twenty-two years of hosting CBS Sunday Morning, Charles Osgood performed a cover of the song at the end of the show.

The song is used at both the beginning and end of the Bob Dylan biopic A Complete Unknown.
