= Library of Congress Recordings =

Woody Guthrie: Library of Congress Recordings

Studio album by Woody Guthrie
- Released: 1964
- Recorded: March 21 and 27, 1940
- Genre: Folk
- Label: Elektra
- Producer: Alan Lomax

Woody Guthrie chronology
Woody Guthrie: Library of Congress Recordings (1964)	Dust Bowl Ballads (1940)

Professional ratings
Review scores
Source	Rating
Amazon.com	3.5/5 stars
Allmusic	5/5 stars

The Library of Congress Recording Sessions refers to a March 1940 session of recordings Woody Guthrie made in Washington, D.C., for Alan Lomax. They were catalogued in the United States Library of Congress. They are notable as the first recordings made of Woody Guthrie. They contain several traditional songs and three of Guthrie's best known songs, "So Long It's Been Good to Know You", "Talking Dust Bowl Blues" and "Do-Re-Mi". The session is also interesting for Guthrie's autobiographical memories of Oklahoma, riding the freight trains and observations on life and America's Great Depression in conversation with Lomax.

These were not intended to be commercial recordings, but some tracks were later released on an Elektra Records three-LP set titled Woody Guthrie: Library of Congress Recordings in 1964.

Rounder Records released the recordings in 1988 on both LP and compact disc.

== Track listing ==
Track	Song Title	Other
1.	Lost Train Blues	Traditional
2.	Railroad Blues	Traditional
3.	Rye Whiskey	Traditional
4.	Old Joe Clark	Traditional
5.	Beaumont Rag	Traditional
6.	Texas Oil Field	Traditional
7.	Greenback Dollar	Traditional
8.	Boll Weevil Song	Traditional
9.	So Long, It's Been Good to Know You	Guthrie
10.	Talking Dust Bowl Blues	Guthrie
11.	Do Re Mi	Guthrie
12.	Hard Times	Guthrie
13.	Pretty Boy Floyd	Guthrie
14.	They Laid Jesus Christ in His Grave	Guthrie
15.	Jolly Banker	Guthrie
16.	I Ain't Got No Home	Guthrie
17.	Dirty Overhalls	Guthrie
18.	Chain Around My Leg	Guthrie
19.	Worried Man Blues	Traditional
20.	Lonesome Valley	Guthrie
21.	Walking Down That Railroad Line	Guthrie
22.	Going Down the Road Feeling Bad	Guthrie
23.	Dust Storm Disaster	Guthrie
24.	Foggy Mountain Top	Traditional
25.	Dust Pneumonia Blues	Guthrie
26.	California Blues	Guthrie
27.	Dust Bowl Refugee	Guthrie
28.	Will Rogers Highway	Guthrie
29.	Los Angeles New Year's Flood	Guthrie

== See also ==
- Woody Guthrie discography
- Alan Lomax
