= Kingsboro Psychiatric Center =

State psychiatric hospital in Brooklyn, New York

- New York State Office of Mental Health

Geography
- Location: 681 Clarkson Avenue, East Flatbush, New York, United States
- Coordinates: 40°39′26″N 73°56′7″W

Organization
- Care system: Public
- Type: Psychiatric
- Network: New York State Office of Mental Health

Links
- Lists: Hospitals in New York State

Kingsboro Psychiatric Center (KPC) is a state psychiatric hospital in the East Flatbush neighborhood of Brooklyn, New York City, operated by the New York State Office of Mental Health (OMH). It provides inpatient and outpatient mental health services for adults from Brooklyn and the surrounding area. It is part of the statewide OMH hospital network.

The hospital occupies a portion of a historic psychiatric campus that originated in the 19th century as the Kings County Lunatic Asylum and later operated as the Long Island State Hospital and Brooklyn State Hospital before taking its present name in the 1970s. As 2025 Kingsboro is listed with 290 inpatient beds, a 70-bed addiction treatment annex, and a transistional residence with 48 beds. In 1998, a staff of 800 was reported.

The campus has been recognized by cultural heritage organizations for its historic psychiatric buildings and former nursing school and for associations with figures such as folk musician Woody Guthrie and civil rights figure Betty Shabazz. Part of the Kingsboro campus has been targeted for redevelopment as a large mixed-use affordable housing project under New York State's Vital Brooklyn initiative.

== History ==
=== 19th-century origins ===
The institution began as a county-run asylum and almshouse complex in Flatbush in the mid-19th century, commonly referred to as the Kings County Lunatic Asylum. Later accounts describe the asylum as part of a broader county system of poor relief and institutional care, which expanded over the late 19th century as patient numbers grew.

In 1895, the asylum complex was transferred to state control and redesignated as the Long Island State Hospital, serving several counties in the region. A farm colony at St. Johnland, later known as Kings Park State Hospital, was developed as an affiliated site to relieve overcrowding.

=== Brooklyn State Hospital and nursing school ===
In the early 20th century, the Flatbush institution became known as Brooklyn State Hospital, one of Brooklyn's principal public psychiatric facilities. A nurses' training school operated on the campus and produced classes of psychiatric nurses who worked in the state hospital system and local health institutions.

City Lore's "Place Matters" project describes the hospital as a "historic state psychiatric facility and former nursing school," noting that many of the campus's historic buildings survived into the 21st century. The same profile records that the hospital grounds included a memorial plaque to staff who died during the 1918 influenza pandemic and early landscape work supported by the Brooklyn Garden Club (now the Brooklyn Botanic Garden).

=== Transition to Kingsboro Psychiatric Center ===
In 1974, the State of New York formally renamed the facility Brooklyn Psychiatric Center under Chapter 558 of the state laws. In 1975, it adopted its current name, Kingsboro Psychiatric Center, under Chapter 670. New York State Archives summaries and related OMH materials describe Kingsboro as the legal successor to the earlier Brooklyn State Hospital.

== Facilities and services ==
Kingsboro Psychiatric Center operates as a state-run psychiatric hospital providing inpatient, outpatient, and community-based mental health services for adults with mental illness.

The OMH facility directory lists Kingsboro's executive director as Carlos Rodriguez Perez. The hospital campus also hosts contracted ancillary services and periodic capital projects overseen by the Dormitory Authority of the State of New York (DASNY), including renovations to inpatient units and roof replacements on several buildings.

== Redevelopment and Vital Brooklyn ==
In 2017, New York State launched the Vital Brooklyn initiative, a multi-billion-dollar program aimed at addressing health, housing, and economic disparities in Central Brooklyn. As part of this initiative, the state sought proposals to redevelop underutilized portions of the Kingsboro campus.

In July 2021, Governor Andrew Cuomo announced the selection of a development team led by Almat Urban, Breaking Ground, Brooklyn Community Services, and other partners to transform roughly 7.2 acres on the western portion of the Kingsboro site. Plans described by state officials and coverage in real estate and housing media call for nearly 900 units of affordable, supportive, and senior housing, two new homeless shelters to replace older facilities on the campus, a grocery store, a community hub with classrooms and computer labs, urban farming space, a greenhouse, and outdoor recreational amenities.

== Cultural significance ==
Kingsboro's predecessor institutions have been noted in cultural history for their association with folk singer and songwriter Woody Guthrie, who spent part of the 1960s hospitalized at Brooklyn State Hospital while being treated for Huntington's disease. City Lore's Place Matters profile links Guthrie's treatment at the hospital to later efforts by his family and advocates to raise awareness of Huntington's disease and improve community-based care.

Scenes from the 1990 film Awakenings were shot on the Kingsboro campus, using some of the original hospital buildings and grounds as a backdrop. The nursing school was attended by Betty Shabazz, widow of Malcolm X.

== Incidents and public debate ==
In 2012, a proposed realignment of state psychiatric services led to public debate over the possible closure or consolidation of Kingsboro Psychiatric Center. New York State Senator Velmanette Montgomery described a "war of words" between Brooklyn and Staten Island lawmakers over the plan and its implications for access to inpatient psychiatric care.

In September 2022, local media reported that a 28-year-old man was found fatally injured inside Kingsboro Psychiatric Center and later died at nearby Kings County Hospital; police investigated the death as a homicide. In 2025, it was reported that the incident was one of many drawing attention to safety and security concerns in state psychiatric facilities.

== See also ==
- New York State Office of Mental Health
- List of hospitals in New York City
- List of hospitals in New York (state)
