= Woody Guthrie Sings Folk Songs =

Compilation album
- Released: 1962
- Recorded: 1940s
- Genre: Folk
- Label: Folkways

Woody Guthrie Sings Folk Songs is a remastered compilation album of American folk songs sung by legend Woody Guthrie accompanied by Lead Belly, Cisco Houston, Sonny Terry, and Bess Lomax Hawes originally recorded for Moses Asch in the 1940s and re-released in 1989 by Folkways Records.

It was given a rating of four and a half by AllMusic, which described it as "an excellent representation of rural folk music that consolidated Guthrie's position as the newly fashionable genre's main progenitor."

== Track listing ==
1. Hard Traveling
2. What Did the Deep Sea Say?
3. "The House of the Rising Sun"
4. Nine Hundred Miles (Instrumental)
5. John Henry
6. Oregon Trail
7. We Shall Be Free
8. Dirty Overalls (My Dirty Overhauls)
9. Jackhammer Blues
10. Springfield Mountain
11. Brown Eyes
12. Boll Weevil Blues (Boll Weevil)
13. Guitar Blues (Instrumental)
14. Will You Miss Me?
