= Songs to Grow on for Mother and Child =

Studio album by Woody Guthrie
- Released: 1956
- Recorded: 1947
- Genres: Folk; children's music
- Label: Folkways

Alternative Cover
- The 1991 reissue cover.

Professional ratings
Review scores
Source	Rating
Allmusic	5/5 stars

Songs to Grow on for Mother and Child is a collection of children's music by folk singer Woody Guthrie. Recorded in 1947 and first released in 1956 by Folkways Records, a remastered recording was issued by Smithsonian Folkways in 1991.

Several songs in the collection are instructional, helping children learn to count. Others are songs of adoration written by Guthrie with his own children in mind. For example, "Goodnight Little Arlo" was written for his son Arlo Guthrie, who was born in 1947, the same year the album was recorded. Guthrie said "I really did try to slant these songs at all of your citizens from 4 to 6, but I spilled over a little on every side."

== Track listing ==
1. "Grassy Grass Grass (Grow, Grow, Grow)"
2. "Swimmy Swim"
3. "Little Sugar (Little Saka Sugar)"
4. "Rattle My Rattle"
5. "I Want My Milk (I Want It Now)"
6. "1, 2, 3, 4, 5, 6, 7, 8"
7. "One Old Day"
8. "Wash-y Wash Wash (Warshy Little Tootsy)"
9. "I'll Eat You, I'll Drink You"
10. "Make a Blobble"
11. "Who's My Pretty Baby (Hey Pretty Baby)"
12. "I'll Write and I'll Draw"
13. "Why, Oh Why"
14. "Pick It Up"
15. "Pretty and Shiny-O"
16. "Needle Sing"
17. "Bling-Blang"
18. "Goodnight Little Arlo (Goodnight Little Darlin')"

== See also ==
- Woody Guthrie discography
