= Do Re Mi (Woody Guthrie song) =

1940 American folk song

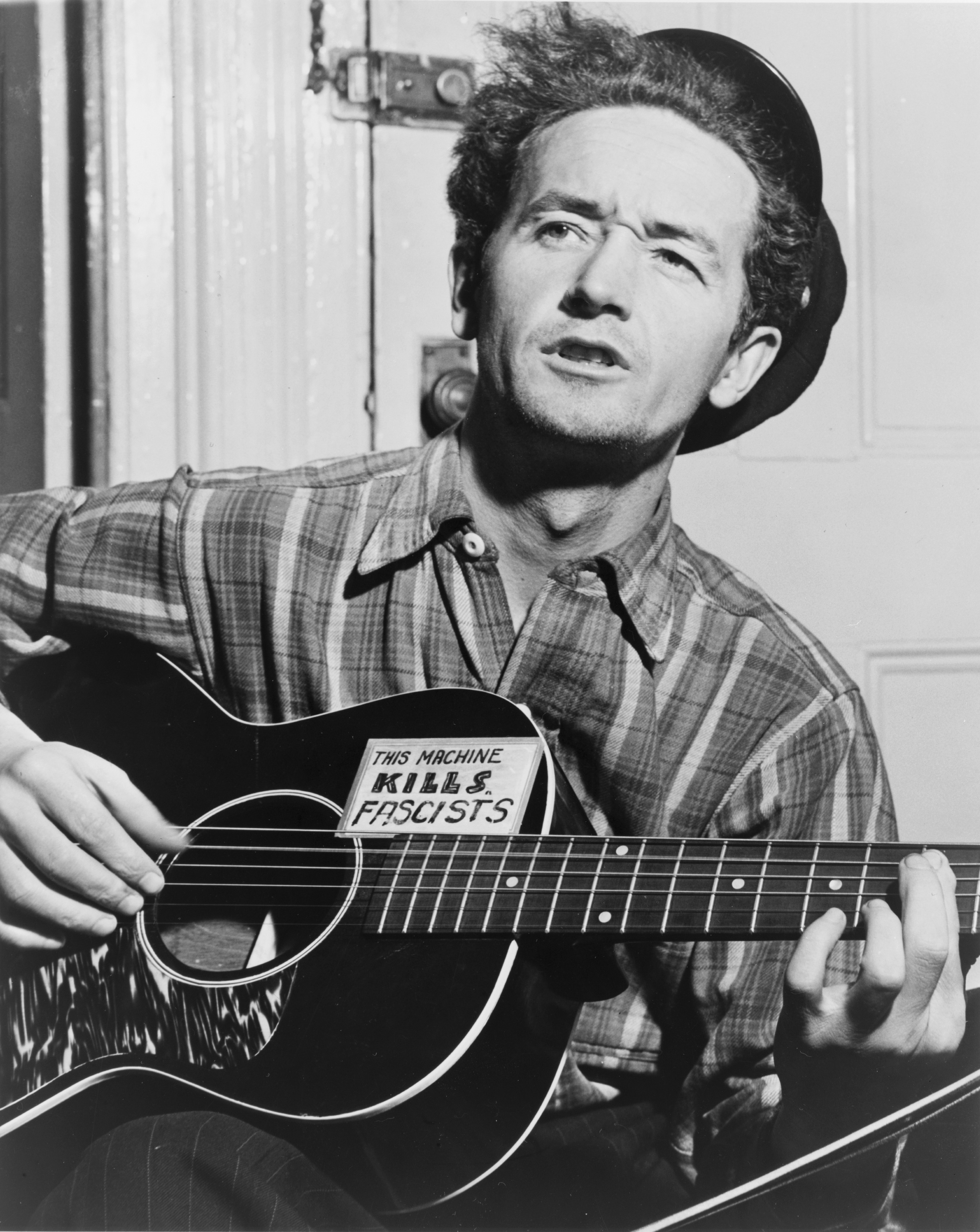
Woody Guthrie

"Do Re Mi" is a folk song by American songwriter Woody Guthrie. The song deals with the experiences and reception of Dust Bowl migrants when they arrive in California. It is known for having two guitar parts, both recorded by Guthrie.

== Background ==
Written by Woody Guthrie, the song is included on his 1940 folk album Dust Bowl Ballads. It takes the form of a warning to would-be migrants to stay where they are (places of origin mentioned include Texas, Oklahoma, Kansas, Georgia, and Tennessee). The argument is made on the basis that there are already too many migrants, and not enough money or work available to make the hardships and expense of the trip worthwhile.

The message of the song parallels a theme of John Steinbeck's seminal novel The Grapes of Wrath, wherein the Joad family makes a dangerous, expensive trip from their home in Oklahoma to California. They encounter a fellow Dust Bowl migrant at a roadside rest-stop who tells them to turn back, echoing the cautionary tone of the song. He cites his own loss and misfortune (he mentions the trials of his dead wife and his underfed children 'moaning like pups') as a warning to others to avoid the same fate. Continuing on in spite of this, the Joads arrive in California nearly penniless, and having buried the two oldest members of the family. There they find there is indeed not enough work or pay to make ends meet.

== Notable recordings ==
After first appearing on Dust Bowl Ballads, it was later released on the compilation Bound for Glory (1956).

=== Selected cover versions ===
- Cisco Houston, on Cisco Houston Sings the Songs of Woody Guthrie (1961)
- Ramblin' Jack Elliott, on Ramblin' Jack Elliott Sings Woody Guthrie And Jimmie Rodgers (1962)
- Ry Cooder, on his self-titled debut album in 1971
- David Carradine, in the 1976 Bound for Glory movie's soundtrack album, Academy Award winner for Best Original Song Score and Its Adaptation or Adaptation Score.
- Nanci Griffith, on her 1993 album Other Voices, Other Rooms (duet with Guy Clark)
- Ani DiFranco, on her 2000 EP Swing Set and on the Woody Guthrie tribute 'Til We Outnumber Em
- Dave Alvin, on his live CD Interstate City
- Bob Dylan, in The People Speak documentary in 2009
- Dan Crary, on the album Flatpicking Guitar
- Colter Wall, on the album Home In This World: Woody Guthrie's Dustbowl Ballads

It is also heavily referenced in AJJ's "Survival Song."
