= Bound for Glory (album) =

Compilation album by Woody Guthrie and Will Geer
- Released: 1956
- Recorded: 1940–45
- Genre: Folk
- Length: 41:39
- Label: Folkways FA 2481

Bound for Glory is a 1956 album by Woody Guthrie and Will Geer. It consists of a selection of songs from Guthrie's Dust Bowl Ballads of 1940 and his Asch recordings of 1944–45, each introduced briefly by Geer with spoken relevant extracts from Guthrie's writings.

By 1956, Guthrie was hospitalized with Huntington's disease, a hereditary condition. On March 17, 1956, a benefit concert was held for his children at the Pythian Hall, New York City; at which Guthrie made one of his last public appearances, sitting in the audience. Various folk singers performed Guthrie's songs, interspersed with readings from Guthrie's writings selected by Millard Lampell, a former member with Guthrie and others of the Almanac Singers.

The album Bound for Glory was compiled and released following that event. The title was taken from Guthrie's 1943 autobiography, Bound for Glory.

The album includes a cyclostyled booklet with an introduction by Lampell, and the spoken and sung words. It has been re-released several times.

== Track listing ==
The album does not credit songwriters, but they are easy to identify.

1. "Stagolee" (trad.)
2. Children's songs:
  1. "Little Sack of Sugar" (trad.)
  2. "Ship in the Sky" (Guthrie)
  3. "Swim, Swim, Swimmy I Swim" (trad.)
3. "Vigilante Man" (Guthrie) (One of the Dust Bowl Ballads)
4. "Do Re Mi" (Guthrie) (One of the Dust Bowl Ballads)
5. "Pastures of Plenty" (Guthrie)
6. "Grand Coulee Dam" (Guthrie)
7. "This Land Is Your Land" (Guthrie)
8. "Talking Fish Blues" (Guthrie)
9. "The Sinking of the Reuben James" (Guthrie)
10. "Jesus Christ" (Guthrie)
11. "There's a Better World a-Coming" (Guthrie)

There is an uncredited additional singer on "There's a Better World a-Coming", who may be Guthrie's frequent collaborator Cisco Houston.
