= The Live Wire: Woody Guthrie in Performance 1949 =

Live album by Woody Guthrie
- Released: September 6, 2007
- Recorded: 1949 at Fuld Hall, Newark, New Jersey, United States
- Genre: Folk
- Length: 74:54
- Label: Woody Guthrie Archives
- Producer: Nora Guthrie Jorge Arévalo Mateus

Woody Guthrie chronology
Dear Mr. President (1942)	The Live Wire: Woody Guthrie in Performance 1949 (2007)

The Live Wire: Woody Guthrie in Performance 1949 is a recording of a concert by Woody Guthrie in Newark, New Jersey, one of a small number of surviving live recordings of the folk singer. The program consists of Guthrie answering questions from his wife Marjorie Guthrie about his life, and singing songs. The recording was made on an inexpensive wire recorder by Paul Braverman, and a significant restoration process was required to clean up the audio on the two spools of wire. In 2008 the album won a Grammy Award for Best Historical Album.

== Track listing ==
1. Intro: How much? How long?
2. "Black Diamond"
3. I was there and the dust was there
4. "The Great Dust Storm"
5. Folk singers and dancers
6. "Talking Dust Bowl Blues"
7. "Tom Joad"
8. Columbia River
9. "Pastures of Plenty"
10. "Grand Coulee Dam"
11. Told by Mother Bloor
12. "1913 Massacre"
13. Quit sending your inspectors
14. "Goodbye Centralia"
15. A cowboy of some kind
16. "Dead or Alive"
17. Jesus Christ has come!
18. "Jesus Christ"
