= Ballads of Sacco & Vanzetti =

Studio album by Woody Guthrie
- Released: 1960
- Recorded: 1946–1947
- Genre: Folk
- Label: Folkways
- Producer: Moe Asch

Ballads of Sacco & Vanzetti is a set of ballad songs, written and performed by Woody Guthrie, related to the trial, conviction and execution of Sacco and Vanzetti. The series was commissioned by Moe Asch in 1945 and recorded in 1946 and 1947. Guthrie never completed the project and was unsatisfied by the result. The project was released later in its abandoned form by Asch.

== Track listing ==
1. "The Flood and the Storm"
2. "I Just Want to Sing Your Name"
3. "Old Judge Thayer"
4. "Red Wine"
5. "Root Hog and Die"
6. "Suassos Lane"
7. "Two Good Men"
8. "Vanzetti's Letter"
9. "Vanzetti's Rock"
10. "We Welcome to Heaven"
11. "You Souls of Boston"

An unreleased track, "Sacco's Letters to His Son" was recorded by Pete Seeger for the project.
