= Nursery Days =

Studio album by Woody Guthrie
- Released: 1951
- Recorded: 1947
- Genres: Folk; Children's music
- Label: Folkways

Alternative Cover
- The 1992 reissue cover.

Professional ratings
Review scores
| Source | Rating |
|---|---|
| AllMusic | 4.5/5 stars |

Nursery Days, originally released as Songs to Grow on, Volume One: Nursery Days, is an album of a collection of children's songs by American Folk singer Woody Guthrie. It was released in 1951 by Folkways Records and later re-released in 1992 with four extra songs under the name Nursery Days by Smithsonian Folkways. Several songs in the collection are instructional, helping children learn to count. Others are songs of adoration written by Guthrie with his own children in mind.

== Track listing ==
| No. | Title | Length |
|---|---|---|
| 1. | "Wake Up" | 3:08 |
| 2. | "Clean-O" | 2:58 |
| 3. | "Dance Around" | 2:14 |
| 4. | "Car Song" | 1:48 |
| 5. | "Don't You Push Me" | 2:24 |
| 6. | "My Dolly" | 2:48 |
| 7. | "Put Your Finger In The Air" | 2:52 |
| 8. | "Come See" | 2:14 |
| 9. | "Race You Down The Mountain" | 2:25 |
| 10. | "How Doo Do" | 1:43 |
| 11. | "Merry Go 'Round" | 1:54 |
| 12. | "Sleepy Eyes" | 1:46 |

1992 Reissue bonus tracks
| No. | Title | Length |
|---|---|---|
| 13. | "My Yellow Crayon" | 3:32 |
| 14. | "Roll On" | 2:51 |
| 15. | "Jiggy Jiggy Bum" | 3:32 |
| 16. | "Bubble Gum" | 2:14 |
