= Ludlow Massacre (song) =

"The Ludlow Massacre"
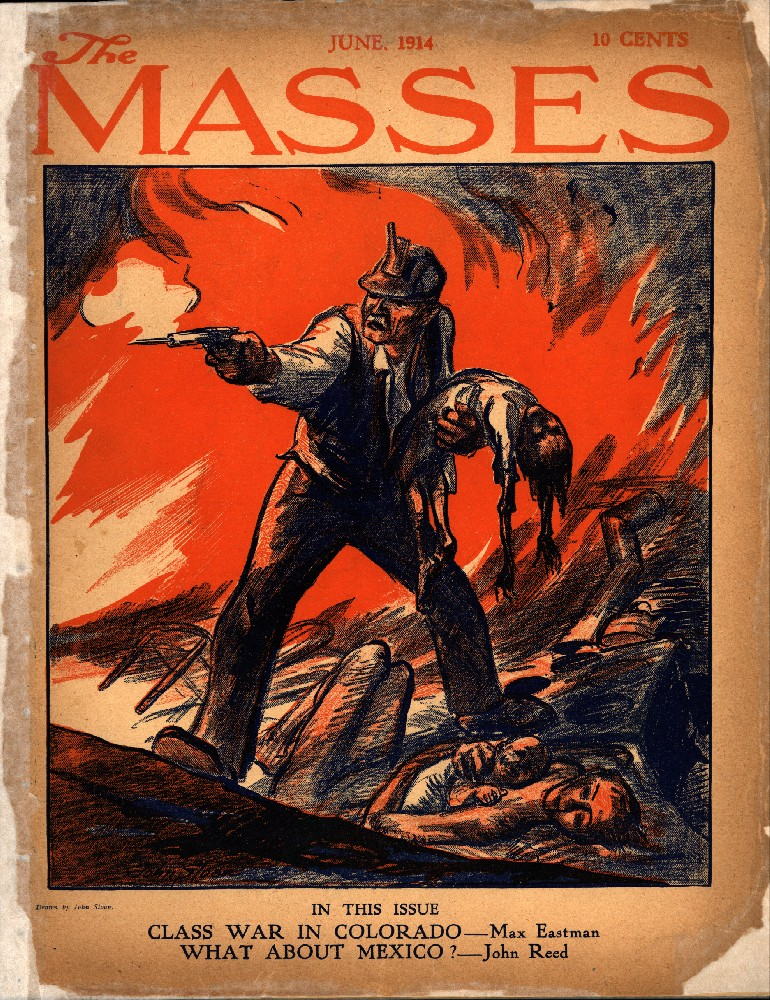
- Contemporary depiction of the Ludlow Massacre

Song by Woody Guthrie
- Written: 1944
- Genre: Protest song
- Songwriter: Woody Guthrie

"Ludlow Massacre" is a song by Woody Guthrie about the Ludlow Massacre, a labor conflict in Ludlow, Colorado, in 1914. A related song is the "1913 Massacre".

Woody Guthrie wrote:

I made up these like I was there on the spot, the day and the night it happened. This is the best way to make up a song like this. When you read the life work of Mother Ella Reeves Bloor 'We Are Many' you will see this story of the Ludlow Massacre, you will be there, you will live it. Ludlow Massacre was one of the hundred of battles fought to build trade unions. I want to sing a song to show our soldiers that Ludlow Massacres must not ever come back to us to kill 13 children and a pregnant woman, just to force you to work for cheap wages.

== Recorded versions ==
- Woody Guthrie Hard Travelin' Asch Recordings. Vol. 3, Struggle Folkways 1992
- Ramblin' Jack Elliot Woody Guthrie's Blues 1955, and South Coast 1995
- Christy Moore recorded a version of the song in 1972

The song has also been recorded by Arlo Guthrie (with the Dillards); Barbara Dane; Dick Gaughan; Joe Glazer; John McCutcheon; Paul Svenson; Ralph McTell; and Tom Juravich.
