= Woody Guthrie =

American singer-songwriter (1912–1967)

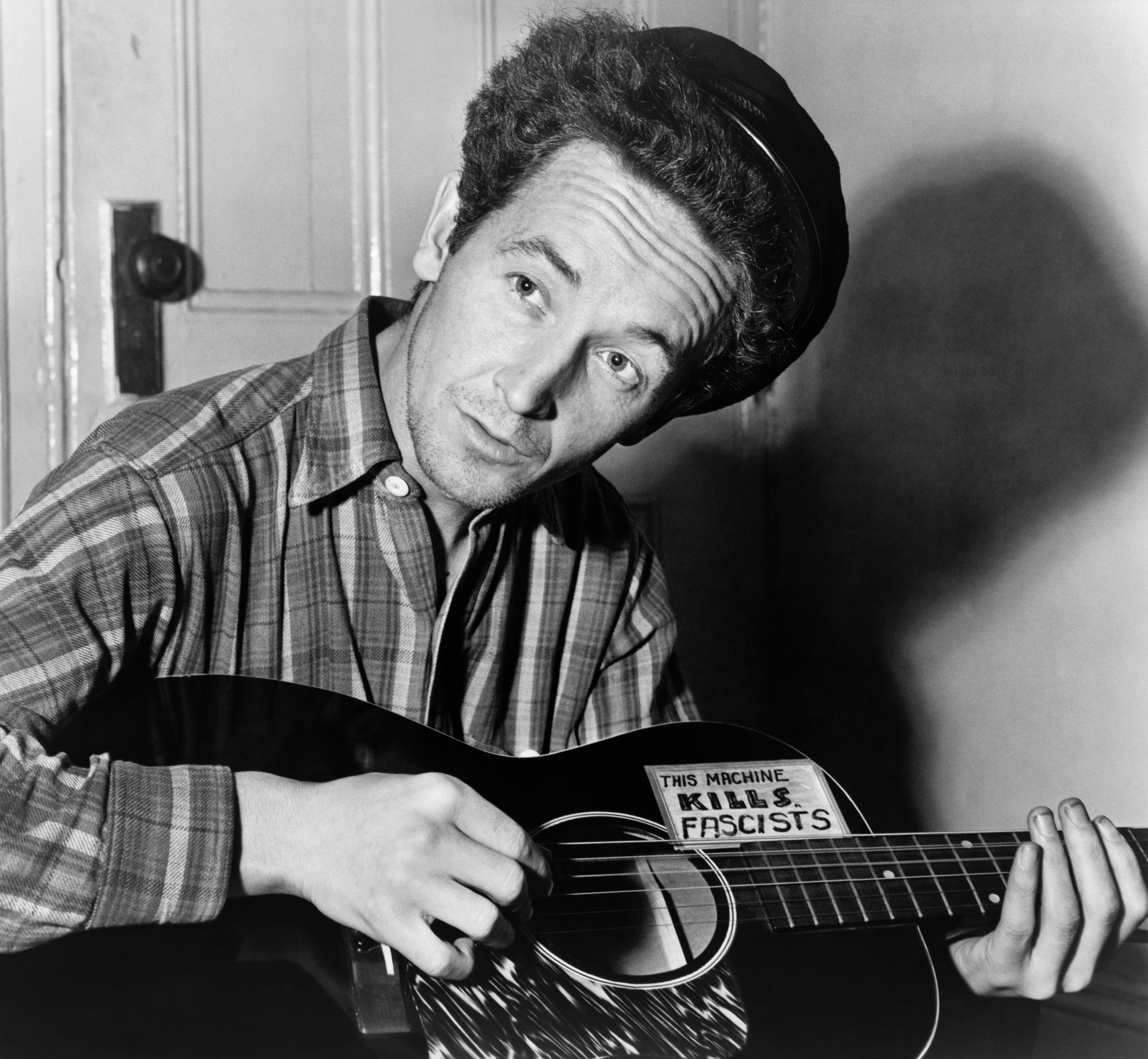
- Guthrie with a guitar labeled "This machine kills fascists" in 1943
- Born: Woodrow Wilson Guthrie; July 14, 1912; Okemah, Oklahoma, U.S.
- Died: October 3, 1967 (aged 55); New York City, U.S.
- Resting place: Highland Cemetery, Okemah, Oklahoma, U.S.
- Spouses: Mary Jennings (m. 1933; div. 1940) Marjorie Greenblatt (m. 1945; div. 1953) Anneke van Kirk (m. 1953; div. 1956)
- Children: 8, including Arlo and Nora
- Musical career
- Genres: Folk; protest music; country; talking blues; Americana
- Occupations: Singer; songwriter; composer
- Instruments: Vocals; guitar; harmonica; mandolin; fiddle
- Works: Discography
- Years active: 1930–1956
- Formerly of: The Almanac Singers
- Military career
- Allegiance: United States
- Branch: United States Merchant Marine; United States Army
- Service years: 1943–1945 (Merchant Marine); 1945 (Army)
- Conflicts: World War II
- Awards: Merchant Marine Atlantic War Zone Medal; Merchant Marine World War II Victory Medal; American Campaign Medal; World War II Victory Medal

Woodrow Wilson Guthrie (/ˈɡʌθri/; July 14, 1912 – October 3, 1967) was an American singer, songwriter, and composer widely considered one of the most significant figures in American folk music. His work focused on themes of American socialism and anti-fascism and has inspired many generations politically and musically with songs such as "This Land Is Your Land" and "Tear the Fascists Down".

Guthrie wrote hundreds of country, folk, and children's songs, along with ballads and improvised works. Dust Bowl Ballads, Guthrie's album of songs about the Dust Bowl period, was included on Mojo's list of 100 Records That Changed the World, and many of his recorded songs are archived in the Library of Congress. Songwriters who have acknowledged Guthrie as an influence include Pete Seeger, Bob Dylan, Johnny Cash, Lou Reed, Phil Ochs, Bruce Springsteen, Donovan, Robert Hunter, Harry Chapin, John Mellencamp, Andy Irvine, Joe Strummer, Billy Bragg, Dropkick Murphys, Jerry Garcia, Bob Weir, Jeff Tweedy, Tom Paxton, Country Joe McDonald, Brian Fallon, Sean Bonnette, Sixto Rodríguez, Steve Earle and Jesse Welles. Guthrie frequently performed with the message "This machine kills fascists" displayed on his guitar.

Guthrie was brought up by middle-class parents in Okemah, Oklahoma. He left Okemah in 1929, after his mother, suffering from Huntington's disease, was institutionalized. Guthrie followed his wayward father to Pampa, Texas, where he was running a flophouse. Though Guthrie lived there for just eight years, the town's influence on him and his music was undeniable. He married at 20, but with the advent of the dust storms that marked the Dust Bowl period, he left his wife and three children to join the thousands of Texans and Okies who were migrating to California looking for employment. He worked at the Los Angeles radio station KFVD, achieving some fame from playing hillbilly music, befriended Will Geer and John Steinbeck, and wrote a column for the communist newspaper People's World from May 1939 to January 1940.

Throughout his life, Guthrie was associated with United States communist groups, although there is no evidence that he was a member of one. With the Molotov–Ribbentrop Pact the Soviet Union had signed with Nazi Germany in 1939, the anti-Stalin owners of KFVD radio were not comfortable with Guthrie's political leanings after he wrote a song praising the Pact and the Soviet invasion of Poland. He left the station and went to New York, where he wrote and recorded his 1940 album Dust Bowl Ballads, based on his experiences during the 1930s, which earned him the nickname the "Dust Bowl Troubadour". In February 1940, he wrote his most famous song, "This Land Is Your Land", a response to what he felt was the overplaying of Irving Berlin's "God Bless America" on the radio.

Guthrie married three times and fathered eight children. His son Arlo Guthrie became nationally known as a musician. Guthrie died in 1967 from complications of Huntington's disease, inherited from his mother. His first two daughters also died of the disease.

== Early life ==
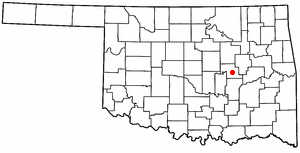
Map of Okemah in Oklahoma

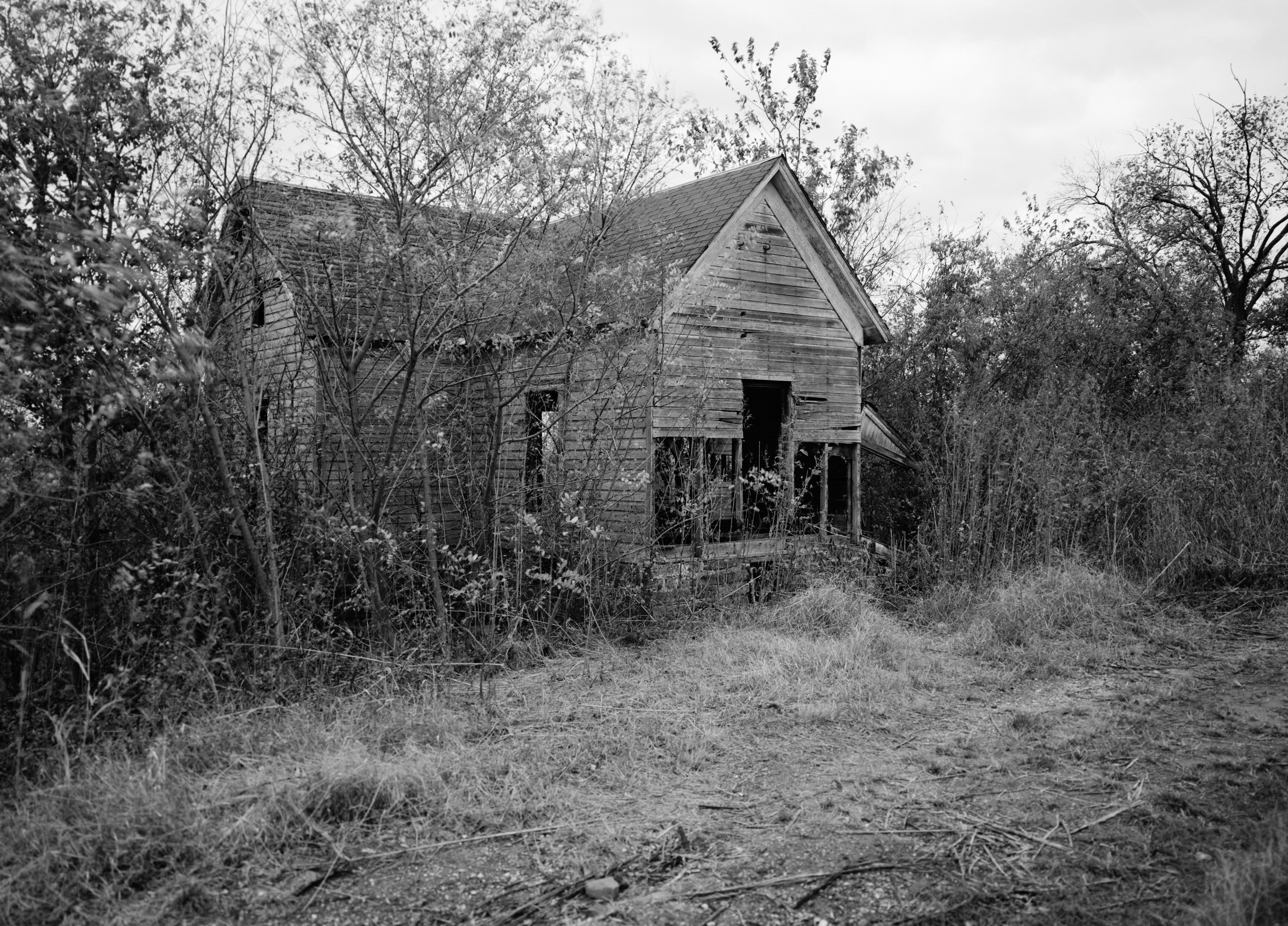
Guthrie's Okfuskee County, Oklahoma, childhood home in 1979

Guthrie was born July 14, 1912, in Okemah, a small town in Okfuskee County, Oklahoma, the son of Nora Belle (née Sherman) and Charles Edward Guthrie. His parents named him after Woodrow Wilson, then Governor of New Jersey and the Democratic candidate who was elected as President of the United States in fall 1912. Charles Guthrie was an industrious businessman, owning at one time up to thirty plots of land in Okfuskee County. He was actively involved in Oklahoma politics and was a Democratic candidate for office in the county. Charles Guthrie was reportedly involved in the 1911 lynching of Laura and L. D. Nelson. (Guthrie wrote three songs about the event in the 1960s. He said that his father, Charles, became a member of the Ku Klux Klan during its revival beginning in 1915.)

Three significant fires affected Guthrie's early life. In 1909, one fire caused the loss of his family's home in Okemah a month after it was completed. When Guthrie was seven, his sister Clara died after setting her clothes on fire during an argument with her mother, and, later, in 1927, their father was severely burned in a fire at home. Guthrie's mother, Nora, was afflicted with Huntington's disease, although the family did not know this at the time. What they could see was dementia and muscular degeneration.

When Woody was 14, Nora was committed to the Oklahoma Hospital for the Insane. At the time his father Charles was living and working in Pampa, Texas, to repay debts from unsuccessful real estate deals. Woody and his siblings were on their own in Oklahoma; they relied on their eldest brother Roy for support. The 14-year-old Woody Guthrie worked odd jobs around Okemah, begging meals and sometimes sleeping at the homes of family friends.

Guthrie had a natural affinity for music, learning old ballads and traditional English and Scottish songs from the parents of friends. Guthrie befriended an African-American shoeshine boy named George, who played blues on his harmonica. After listening to George play, Guthrie bought his own harmonica and began playing along with him. He used to busk for money and food. Although Guthrie did not do well as a student and dropped out of high school in his senior year before graduation, his teachers described him as bright. He was an avid reader on a wide range of topics.

In 1929, Guthrie's father sent for Woody to join him in Texas, but little changed for the aspiring musician. Guthrie, then 18, was reluctant to attend high school classes in Pampa; he spent most of his time learning songs by busking on the streets and reading in the library at Pampa's city hall. He regularly played at dances with his father's half-brother Jeff Guthrie, a fiddle player. His mother died in 1930 of complications of Huntington's disease while still in the Oklahoma Hospital for the Insane. In 1931 Guthrie met his first wife, Mary Jennings, the younger sister of his musician friend Matt Jennings. They married in Pampa in 1933.

== Career ==
=== 1930s ===
During the Dust Bowl period, Guthrie joined the thousands of Okies and others who migrated to California to look for work, leaving his wife and children in Texas. Many of his songs are concerned with the conditions faced by working-class people.

During the latter part of that decade in Los Angeles, he achieved fame with radio partner Maxine "Lefty Lou" Crissman as a broadcast performer of commercial hillbilly music and traditional folk music. Guthrie was making enough money to send for his family to join him from Texas. While appearing on the radio station KFVD, owned by a populist-minded New Deal Democrat, Frank W. Burke, Guthrie began to write and perform some of the protest songs that he eventually released on his album Dust Bowl Ballads.

This song is Copyrighted in U.S., under Seal of Copyright #154085, for a period of 28 years, and anybody caught singin' it without our permission, will be mighty good friends of ourn, cause we don't give a dern. Publish it. Write it. Sing it. Swing to it. Yodel it. We wrote it, that's all we wanted to do.

— Written by Guthrie in the late 1930s on a songbook distributed to listeners of his Los Angeles radio show Woody and Lefty Lou, who wanted the words to his recordings.

While at KFVD, Guthrie met newscaster Ed Robbin. Robbin was impressed with a song Guthrie wrote about political activist Thomas Mooney, wrongly convicted in a case that was a cause célèbre of the time. Robbin, who became Guthrie's political mentor, introduced Guthrie to socialists and communists in Southern California, including Will Geer. He also introduced Guthrie to writer John Steinbeck. Robbin remained Guthrie's lifelong friend and helped Guthrie book benefit performances in the communist circles in Southern California.

Notwithstanding Guthrie's later claim that "the best thing that I did in 1936 was to sign up with the Communist Party", he was never a member of the party. Guthrie was identified as a fellow traveler—an outsider who agreed with the platform of the party while avoiding party discipline. Guthrie wrote a column for the communist newspaper People's World. The column, titled "Woody Sez", appeared a total of 174 times from May 1939 to January 1940. "Woody Sez" was not explicitly political, but it covered current events as observed by Guthrie. He wrote the columns in an exaggerated hillbilly dialect and usually included a small comic. These columns were published posthumously as a collection.

With the non-aggression pact the Soviet Union had signed with Nazi Germany in 1939 and the subsequent outbreak of World War II, the owners of KFVD radio did not want its staff "spinning apologia" for the Soviet Union. They fired both Robbin and Guthrie. Without the daily radio show, Guthrie's employment chances declined, and he returned with his family to Pampa, Texas. Although Mary was happy to return to Texas, Guthrie preferred to accept Will Geer's invitation to New York City and headed east.

=== 1940s: Building a legacy ===
==== New York City ====
Arriving in New York, Guthrie, known as "the Oklahoma cowboy", was embraced by its folk music community. For a time, he slept on a couch in Will Geer's apartment. Guthrie made his first recordings—several hours of conversation and songs recorded by the folklorist Alan Lomax for the Library of Congress—as well as an album, Dust Bowl Ballads, for Victor Records in Camden, New Jersey.

"This Land is Your Land"
Sample of Guthrie's song, "This Land is Your Land"

In February 1940, he wrote his most famous song, "This Land Is Your Land", as a response to what he felt was an overplaying of Irving Berlin's "God Bless America" on the radio. Guthrie thought the lyrics were unrealistic and complacent. He adapted the melody from an old gospel song, "Oh My Loving Brother", which had been adapted by the country group the Carter Family for their song "Little Darling Pal Of Mine". Guthrie signed the manuscript with the comment, "All you can write is what you see." Although the song was written in 1940, it was four years before he recorded it for Moses Asch in April 1944. Sheet music was produced and given to schools by Howie Richmond sometime later.

In March 1940, Guthrie was invited to play at a benefit hosted by the John Steinbeck Committee to Aid Farm Workers, to raise money for migrant workers. There he met the folk singer Pete Seeger, and the two men became good friends. Seeger accompanied Guthrie back to Texas to meet other members of the Guthrie family. He recalled an awkward conversation with Mary Guthrie's mother, in which she asked for Seeger's help to persuade Guthrie to treat her daughter better.

From April 1940, Guthrie and Seeger lived together in the Greenwich Village loft of sculptor Harold Ambellan and his fiancée. Guthrie had some success in New York at this time as a guest on CBS's radio program Back Where I Come From and used his influence to get a spot on the show for his friend Huddie "Lead Belly" Ledbetter. Ledbetter's Tenth Street apartment was a gathering spot for the musician circle in New York at the time, and Guthrie and Ledbetter were good friends, as they had busked together at bars in Harlem.

In November 1941, Seeger introduced Guthrie to his friend the poet Charles Olson, then a junior editor at the fledgling magazine Common Ground. The meeting led to Guthrie writing the article "Ear Players" in the Spring 1942 issue of the magazine. The article marked Guthrie's debut as a published writer in the mainstream media.

In September 1940, Guthrie was invited by the Model Tobacco Company to host their radio program Pipe Smoking Time. Guthrie was paid $180 a week, an impressive salary in 1940. He was finally making enough money to send regular payments back to Mary. He also brought her and the children to New York, where the family lived briefly in an apartment on Central Park West. The reunion represented Woody's desire to be a better father and husband. He said, "I have to set [sic] real hard to think of being a dad." Guthrie quit after the seventh broadcast, claiming he had begun to feel the show was too restrictive when he was told what to sing. Disgruntled with New York, Guthrie packed up Mary and his children in a new car and headed west to California.

Choreographer Sophie Maslow developed Folksay as an elaborate mix of modern dance and ballet, which combined folk songs by Woody Guthrie with text from Carl Sandburg's 1936 book-length poem The People, Yes. The premiere took place in March 1942 at the Humphrey-Weidman Studio Theatre in New York City. Guthrie provided live music for the performance, which featured Maslow and her New Dance Group. Two and a half years later, Maslow brought Folksay to early television under the direction of Leo Hurwitz. The same group performed the ballet live in front of CBS TV cameras. The 30-minute broadcast aired on WCBW, the pioneer CBS television station in New York City (now WCBS-TV), from 8:15–8:45 pm ET on November 24, 1944. Featured were Maslow and the New Dance Group, which included among others Jane Dudley, Pearl Primus, and William Bales. Woody Guthrie and fellow folk singer Tony Kraber played guitar, sang songs, and read text from The People, Yes. The program received positive reviews and was performed on television over WCBW a second time in early 1945.

==== Pacific Northwest ====
Video: In 1941 Guthrie wrote songs for The Columbia, a documentary about the Columbia River released in 1949. Playing time 21:10.

In May 1941, after a brief stay in Los Angeles, Guthrie moved to Portland, Oregon, in the neighborhood of Lents, on the promise of a job. Gunther von Fritsch was directing a documentary about the Bonneville Power Administration's construction of the Grand Coulee Dam on the Columbia River, and needed a narrator. Alan Lomax had recommended Guthrie to narrate the film and sing songs onscreen. The original project was expected to take 12 months, but as filmmakers became worried about casting such a political figure, they minimized Guthrie's role. The Department of the Interior hired him for one month to write songs about the Columbia River and the benefits of Bonneville's construction of federal dams for the documentary's soundtrack. Guthrie toured the Columbia River and the Pacific Northwest. Guthrie said he "couldn't believe it, it's a paradise", which appeared to inspire him creatively. In one month Guthrie wrote 26 songs, including three of his most famous: "Roll On, Columbia, Roll On", "Pastures of Plenty", and "Grand Coulee Dam". The surviving songs were released as Columbia River Songs. The film "Columbia" was not completed until 1949 (see below). At the conclusion of the month in Oregon and Washington, Guthrie wanted to return to New York. Tired of the continual uprooting, Mary Guthrie told him to go without her and the children. Although Guthrie would see Mary again, once on a tour through Los Angeles with the Almanac Singers, it was essentially the end of their marriage. Divorce was difficult, since Mary was a Catholic, but she reluctantly agreed in December 1943.

==== Almanac Singers ====
Following the conclusion of his work in the Northwest, Guthrie corresponded with Pete Seeger about Seeger's newly formed folk-protest group, the Almanac Singers. Guthrie returned to New York with plans to tour the country as a member of the group. The singers originally worked out of a loft in New York City hosting regular concerts called "hootenannies", a word Pete and Woody had picked up in their cross-country travels. The singers eventually outgrew the space and moved into the cooperative Almanac House in Greenwich Village.

Initially, Guthrie helped write and sing what the Almanac Singers termed "peace" songs while the Nazi–Soviet Pact was in effect. After Hitler's invasion of the Soviet Union, the group wrote anti-fascist songs. The members of the Almanac Singers and residents of the Almanac House were a loosely defined group of musicians, though the core members included Guthrie, Pete Seeger, Millard Lampell and Lee Hays. In keeping with common utopian ideals, meals, chores and rent at the Almanac House were shared. The Sunday hootenannies were good opportunities to collect donation money for rent. Songs written in the Almanac House had shared songwriting credits among all the members, although in the case of "Union Maid", members would later state that Guthrie wrote the song, ensuring that his children would receive residuals.

In the Almanac House, Guthrie added authenticity to their work, since he was a "real" working class Oklahoman. "There was the heart of America personified in Woody ... And for a New York Left that was primarily Jewish, first or second generation American, and was desperately trying to get Americanized, I think a figure like Woody was of great, great importance", a friend of the group, Irwin Silber, would say. Woody routinely emphasized his working-class image, rejected songs he felt were not in the country blues vein he was familiar with, and rarely contributed to household chores. House member Agnes "Sis" Cunningham, another Okie, would later recall that Woody "loved people to think of him as a real working class person and not an intellectual". Guthrie contributed songwriting and authenticity in much the same capacity for Pete Seeger's post-Almanac Singers project People's Songs, a newsletter and booking organization for labor singers, founded in 1945.

==== Bound for Glory ====
Guthrie was a prolific writer, penning thousands of pages of unpublished poems and prose, many written while living in New York City. After a recording session with Alan Lomax, Lomax suggested Guthrie write an autobiography. Lomax thought Guthrie's descriptions of growing up were some of the best accounts he had read of American childhood. During this time, Guthrie met Marjorie Mazia (the professional name of Marjorie Greenblatt), a dancer in New York who would become his second wife. Mazia was an instructor at the Martha Graham Dance School, where she was assisting Sophie Maslow with her piece Folksay. Based on the folklore and poetry collected by Carl Sandburg, Folksay included the adaptation of some of Guthrie's Dust Bowl Ballads for the dance. Guthrie continued to write songs and began work on his autobiography. The end product, Bound for Glory, was completed with editing assistance by Mazia and was first published by E.P. Dutton in 1943. It is told in the artist's down-home dialect. The Library Journal complained about the "too careful reproduction of illiterate speech". However, Clifton Fadiman, reviewing the book in The New Yorker, remarked that "Someday people are going to wake up to the fact that Woody Guthrie and the ten thousand songs that leap and tumble off the strings of his music box are a national possession, like Yellowstone and Yosemite, and part of the best stuff this country has to show the world."

This book was the inspiration for the movie Bound for Glory, starring David Carradine, which won the 1976 Academy Award for Original Music Score for Original Song Score and Its Adaptation or Adaptation Score, and the National Board of Review Award for Best Actor, among other accolades.

In 1944, Guthrie met Moses "Moe" Asch of Folkways Records, for whom he first recorded "This Land Is Your Land". Over the next few years, he recorded "Worried Man Blues", along with hundreds of other songs. These recordings would later be released by Folkways and Stinson Records, which had joint distribution rights. The Folkways recordings are available (through the Smithsonian Institution online shop); the most complete series of these sessions, culled from dates with Asch, is titled The Asch Recordings.

=== World War II years ===
Guthrie believed performing his anti-fascist songs and poems in the United States was the best use of his talents.

==== Labor for Victory ====
In April 1942, Time magazine reported that the AFL (American Federation of Labor) and the Congress of Industrial Organizations (CIO) had agreed to a joint radio production, called Labor for Victory. NBC agreed to run the weekly segment as a "public service". The AFL and CIO presidents William Green and Philip Murray agreed to let their press chiefs, Philip Pearl and Len De Caux, narrate on alternate weeks. The show ran on NBC radio on Saturdays 10:15–10:30 pm, starting on April 25, 1942. Time wrote, "De Caux and Pearl hope to make the Labor for Victory program popular enough for an indefinite run, using labor news, name speakers and interviews with workmen. Labor partisanship, they promise, is out." Writers for Labor for Victory included: Peter Lyon, a progressive journalist; Millard Lampell (born Allan Sloane), later an American movie and television screenwriter; and Morton Wishengrad, who worked for the AFL.

For entertainment on CIO episodes, De Caux asked singer and songwriter Woody Guthrie to contribute to the show. "Personally, I would like to see a phonograph record made of your 'Girl in the Red, White, and Blue.'" The title appears in at least one collection of Guthrie records. Guthrie consented and performed solo two or three times on this program (among several other WWII radio shows, including Answering You, Labor for Victory, Jazz in America, and We the People). On August 29, 1942, he performed "The Farmer-Labor Train", with lyrics he had written to the tune of "Wabash Cannonball". (In 1948, he reworked the "Wabash Cannonball" melody as "The Wallace-Taylor Train" for the 1948 Progressive National Convention, which nominated former U.S. Vice President Henry A. Wallace for president.) The Almanac Singers (of which Guthrie and Lampell were co-founders) appeared on The Treasury Hour and CBS Radio's We the People. The latter was later produced as a television series. (Also, Marc Blitzstein's papers show that Guthrie made some contributions to four CIO episodes (dated June 20, June 27, August 1, August 15, 1948) of Labor for Victory.) While Labor for Victory was a milestone in theory as a national platform, in practice it proved less so. Only 35 of 104 NBC affiliates carried the show. Episodes included the announcement that the show represented "twelve million organized men and women, united in the high resolve to rid the world of Fascism in 1942". Speakers included Donald E. Montgomery, then "consumer's counselor" at the U.S. Department of Agriculture.

==== Merchant Marine ====
Guthrie lobbied the United States Army to accept him as a USO performer instead of conscripting him as a soldier in the draft. When Guthrie's attempts failed, his friends Cisco Houston and Jim Longhi persuaded the singer to join the U.S. Merchant Marine in June 1943. He made several voyages aboard merchant ships SS William B. Travis, SS William Floyd, and SS Sea Porpoise, while they traveled in convoys during the Battle of the Atlantic. He served as a mess man and dishwasher, and frequently sang for the crew and troops to buoy their spirits on transatlantic voyages. His first ship, William B. Travis, hit a mine in the Mediterranean Sea, killing one person aboard, but the ship sailed to Bizerte, Tunisia under her own power.

His last ship, Sea Porpoise, took troops from the United States to England and France for the D-Day invasion. Guthrie was aboard when the ship was torpedoed off Utah Beach by the German submarine U-390 on July 5, 1944, injuring 12 of the crew. Guthrie was unhurt and the ship stayed afloat; Sea Porpoise returned to England, where she was repaired at Newcastle. In July 1944, she returned to the United States.

Guthrie was an active supporter of the National Maritime Union, one of many unions for wartime American merchant sailors. Guthrie wrote songs about his experience in the Merchant Marine but was never satisfied with them. Longhi later wrote about Guthrie's marine experiences in his book Woody, Cisco and Me. The book offers a rare first-hand account of Guthrie during his Merchant Marine service, at one point describing how Guthrie referred to his guitar as a "Hoping Machine". But later during duty aboard the troop ship, Guthrie built an actual "Hoping Machine" made of cloth, whirligigs and discarded metal attached to a railing at the stern, aimed at lifting the soldiers' spirits. In 1945, the government decided that Guthrie's association with communism excluded him from further service in the Merchant Marine; he was drafted into the U.S. Army.

While he was on furlough from the Army, Guthrie married Marjorie. After his discharge, they moved to Brooklyn, New York, where they lived in a house on Mermaid Avenue in the Coney Island neighborhood. Over time, they had four children: daughters Cathy and Nora; and sons Arlo and Joady. Cathy died as a result of a fire at the age of four, and Guthrie suffered a serious depression from his grief. Arlo and Joady followed in their father's footsteps as singer-songwriters.

When his family was young, Guthrie wrote and recorded Songs to Grow on for Mother and Child, a collection of children's music, which includes the song "Goodnight Little Arlo (Goodnight Little Darlin')", written when Arlo was about nine years old. During 1947, he wrote House of Earth, an historical novel containing explicit sexual material, about a couple who build a house made of clay and earth to withstand the Dust Bowl's brutal weather. He could not get it published. It was published posthumously in 2013, by Harper, under actor Johnny Depp's publishing imprint, Infinitum Nihil.

Guthrie was also a prolific sketcher and painter, his images ranging from simple, impressionistic images to free and characterful drawings, typically of the people in his songs.

In 1949, Guthrie's music was used in the documentary film Columbia River, which explored government dams and hydroelectric projects on the river. Guthrie had been commissioned by the US Bonneville Power Administration in 1941 to write songs for the project, but it had been postponed by World War II.

=== Post-war: Mermaid Avenue ===
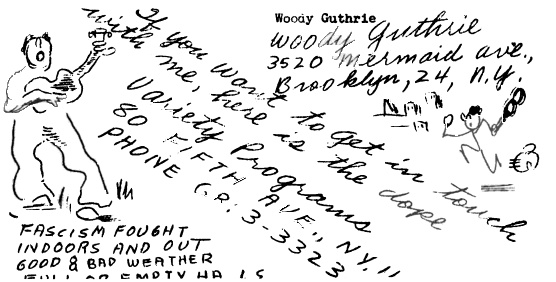
This page from a collection of Guthrie's sheet music published in 1946 includes his Mermaid Avenue address and one of his anti-fascist slogans

The years immediately after the war when he lived on Mermaid Avenue were among Guthrie's most productive as a writer. His extensive writings from this time were archived and maintained by Marjorie and later his estate, mostly handled by his daughter Nora. Several of the manuscripts also contain writing by a young Arlo and the other Guthrie children.

During this time Ramblin' Jack Elliott studied extensively under Guthrie, visiting his home and observing how he wrote and performed. Elliott, like Bob Dylan later, idolized Guthrie. He was inspired by the singer's idiomatic performance style and repertoire. Because of the decline caused by Guthrie's progressive Huntington's disease, Arlo Guthrie and Bob Dylan both later said that they had learned much of Guthrie's performance style from Elliott. When asked about this, Elliott said, "I was flattered. Dylan learned from me the same way I learned from Woody. Woody didn't teach me. He just said, If you want to learn something, just steal it—that's the way I learned from Lead Belly."

== Later life and death ==
=== Deteriorating health due to Huntington's ===
By the late 1940s, Guthrie's health was declining, and his behavior was becoming extremely erratic. He received various diagnoses (including alcoholism and schizophrenia). In 1952, it was finally determined that he was suffering from Huntington's disease, a genetic disorder inherited from his mother. Believing him to be a danger to their children because of his behavior, Marjorie suggested he return to California without her. They eventually divorced.

Upon his return to California, Guthrie lived at the Theatricum Botanicum, a summer-stock type theatre founded and owned by Will Geer. Together with singers and actors who had been blacklisted by HUAC, he waited out the anti-communist political climate.

As his health worsened, he met and married his third wife, Anneke van Kirk. They had a child, Lorina Lynn. The couple moved to Fruit Cove, Florida, where they briefly lived. They lived in a bus on land called Beluthahatchee, owned by his friend Stetson Kennedy. Guthrie's arm was hurt in an accident when gasoline used to start a campfire exploded. Although he regained movement in the arm, he was never able to play the guitar again. In 1954, the couple returned to New York, living in the Beach Haven apartment complex owned and operated by Fred Trump in Gravesend, Brooklyn; Guthrie composed there the song "Old Man Trump". Shortly after, Anneke filed for divorce, a result of the strain of caring for Guthrie. Anneke left New York after arranging for friends to adopt Lorina Lynn. Lorina had no further contact with her birth parents. She died in a car crash in California in 1973 at the age of 19. After the divorce, Guthrie's second wife, Marjorie, re-entered his life and cared for him until his death.

Increasingly unable to control his muscles, Guthrie was hospitalized at Greystone Park Psychiatric Hospital in Morris County, New Jersey, from 1956 to 1961; at Brooklyn State Hospital (now Kingsboro Psychiatric Center) in East Flatbush until 1966; and finally at Creedmoor Psychiatric Center in Queens Village, New York, until his death in 1967. Marjorie and the children visited Guthrie at Greystone every Sunday. They answered fan mail and the children played on the hospital grounds. Eventually, a longtime fan of Guthrie invited the family to his nearby home for the Sunday visits. This lasted until Guthrie was moved to the Brooklyn State Hospital, which was closer to Howard Beach, New York, where Marjorie and the children then lived.

During the final few years of his life, Guthrie had become isolated except for family. By 1965, he was unable to speak, often moving his arms or rolling his eyes to communicate. The progression of Huntington's threw Guthrie into extreme emotional states, causing him to lash out at those nearby and to damage a prized book collection of Anneke's. Huntington's symptoms include uncharacteristic aggression, emotional volatility, and social disinhibition.

Guthrie's death increased awareness of the disease. Marjorie helped found the Committee to Combat Huntington's Disease, which became the Huntington's Disease Society of America. None of Guthrie's three surviving children with Marjorie have developed symptoms of Huntington's.

=== Folk revival and death ===
In the late 1950s and early 1960s, a new generation of young people were inspired by folk singers such as Guthrie. The American Folk Revival was beginning to take place, focused on the issues of the day, such as the civil rights movement and Free Speech Movement. Pockets of folk singers were forming around the country in places such as Cambridge, Massachusetts, and the Greenwich Village neighborhood of New York City. One of Guthrie's visitors at Greystone Park was the 19-year-old Bob Dylan, who idolized Guthrie. Dylan wrote of Guthrie's repertoire: "The songs themselves were really beyond category. They had the infinite sweep of humanity in them." After learning of Guthrie's whereabouts, Dylan regularly visited him.

Guthrie died at Creedmoor Psychiatric Center of complications of Huntington's disease on October 3, 1967. According to a Guthrie family legend, he was listening to his son Arlo's "Alice's Restaurant", a recording of which Arlo had delivered to Woody's bedside, shortly before he died. His remains were cremated and scattered at sea. By the time of Guthrie's death, his work had been discovered by a new audience, introduced to them through Dylan, Pete Seeger, Ramblin' Jack Elliott, his ex-wife Marjorie, and other new members of the folk revival, including his son Arlo Guthrie.

For a December 3, 1944, radio show, Guthrie wrote a script explaining why he sang the kinds of songs he did, reading it on air:

I hate a song that makes you think that you are not any good. I hate a song that makes you think that you are just born to lose. Bound to lose. No good to nobody. No good for nothing. Because you are too old or too young or too fat or too slim too ugly or too this or too that. Songs that run you down or poke fun at you on account of your bad luck or hard traveling. I am out to fight those songs to my very last breath of air and my last drop of blood. I am out to sing songs that will prove to you that this is your world and that if it's hit you pretty hard and knocked you for a dozen loops, no matter what color, what size you are, how you are built, I am out to sing the songs that make you take pride in yourself and in your work.

== Personal life ==
=== Marriage and family ===
At age 19, Guthrie met his first wife, Oklahoma-born Mary Jennings (1917–2014), in Texas in 1931; they married in 1933. They had three children together: Gwendolyn, Sue, and Bill. Bill died at the age of 23 as the result of an automobile accident in Pomona, California. The daughters both died of Huntington's disease. Evidently, the disease had been passed on from their father, although Guthrie himself was diagnosed with the condition later in life, in 1952, when he was 40 years old. Guthrie and Mary divorced sometime between 1943 and 1945.

On November 13, 1945, Guthrie married Marjorie Greenblatt. They had four children: sons Arlo and Joady and daughters Nora and Cathy. After Guthrie was admitted to Brooklyn State Hospital in 1952, doctors advised Marjorie to divorce him and take custody of the children because of Guthrie's raging paranoia and occasional violent acts against family members. They were divorced in 1953. Despite the divorce, she remained close to Guthrie for the rest of his life and supervised all of his complex health needs.

After his discharge from the hospital, Guthrie had a romantic relationship with Anneke van Kirk from late 1952, marrying her in 1953 and having a daughter, Lorina Lynn. However, due to his deteriorating condition, this relationship led to their divorce just one year later. Guthrie had a total of eight children over his three relationships.

=== Political views and relation to the Communist Party ===
Socialism had an important impact on Guthrie's work. In the introduction to Will Kaufman's book Woody Guthrie an American Radical, Kaufman writes, "Woody Guthrie spent his productive life on the warpath-against poverty, political oppression, censorship, capitalism, fascism, racism, and, ultimately, war itself." Guthrie would time and time again back these beliefs up in his lyrics, specifically against capitalism at the height of the depression in the United States.

Guthrie never publicly declared himself a communist, though he was closely associated with the Communist Party. Kaufman writes:

As he once claimed: "If you call me a Communist, I am very proud because it takes a wise and hard-working person to be a Communist" (quoted in Klein, p. 303). Klein also writes that Guthrie applied to join the Communist Party, but his application was turned down. In later years, he'd say, "I'm not a Communist, but I've been in the red all my life." He took great delight in proclaiming his hopes for a communist victory in the Korean War and more than once expressed his admiration for Stalin. Unlike his musical protégé, Pete Seeger, Guthrie never offered any regret for his Stalinism.

The matter of Guthrie's membership in the Communist Party, however, remains controversial. Scholar Ronald Radosh has written:

[H]is friends Gordon Friesen and Sis Cunningham, the founders in the 1960s of Broadside, and former members of the Almanac Singers, told me in a 1970s interview that Woody was a member of the same CP club as they were, and was regularly given a stack of The Daily Worker which he had to sell on the streets each day.

Similarly, writer and historian Aaron J. Leonard, in an article detailing Guthrie's Party membership for the History News Network, quoted Pete Seeger:

On the other hand, Sis Cunningham, who was a much more disciplined person than either me or Woody, was in a Greenwich Village Branch of the Party. She got Woody in. She probably said, 'I'll see Woody acts responsibly.' And so Woody was briefly in the Communist Party.

In his book The Folk Singers and the Bureau, Leonard also documents how the FBI treated Guthrie as if he were a member, adding him to various iterations of their Security Index and keeping him on it till well into the early 1960s.

After the Molotov–Ribbentrop Pact, Guthrie took an antiwar U-turn and wrote one song describing the Soviet invasion of Poland as a favor to Polish farmers and another attacking President Roosevelt's loans to Finland to help it defend against the Soviet Union's invasion in the 1939 Winter War. His attitude switched again in 1941 after the Nazis invaded the Soviet Union.

== Musical legacy ==
=== Woody Guthrie Foundation ===
The Woody Guthrie Foundation is a non-profit organization that serves as administrator and caretaker of the Woody Guthrie Archives. The archives house the largest collection of Guthrie material in the world. In 2013, the archives were relocated from New York City to the Woody Guthrie Center in Tulsa, Oklahoma, after being purchased by the Tulsa-based George Kaiser Foundation. The Center officially opened on April 27, 2013. The Woody Guthrie Center features, in addition to the archives, a museum focused on the life and the influence of Guthrie through his music, writings, art, and political activities. The museum is open to the public; the archives are open only to researchers by appointment. The archives contains thousands of items related to Guthrie, including original artwork, books, correspondence, lyrics, manuscripts, media, notebooks, periodicals, personal papers, photographs, scrapbooks, and other special collections.

Guthrie's unrecorded written lyrics housed at the archives have been the starting point of several albums including the Wilco and Billy Bragg albums Mermaid Avenue and Mermaid Avenue Vol. II, created in 1998 sessions at the invitation of Guthrie's daughter Nora. Blackfire interpreted previously unreleased Guthrie lyrics. Jonatha Brooke's 2008 album, The Works, includes lyrics from the Woody Guthrie Archives set to music by Jonatha Brooke. The various artists compilation Note of Hope: A Celebration of Woody Guthrie was released in 2011. Jay Farrar, Will Johnson, Anders Parker, and Yim Yames recorded her father's lyrics for New Multitudes to honor the 100th anniversary of his birth and a box set of the Mermaid Avenue sessions was also released.

=== Folk Festival ===
The Woody Guthrie Folk Festival, also known as "WoodyFest", has been held annually since 1998 in mid-July to commemorate Guthrie's life and music. The festival is held on the weekend closest to Guthrie's birth date (July 14) in Guthrie's hometown of Okemah, Oklahoma. Planned and implemented annually by the Woody Guthrie Coalition, a non-profit corporation, its goal is to preserve Guthrie's musical legacy. The Woody Guthrie Coalition commissioned a local Creek Indian sculptor to cast a full-body bronze statue of Guthrie and his guitar, complete with the guitar's well-known message reading, "This machine kills fascists". The statue, sculpted by artist Dan Brook, stands along Okemah's main street in the heart of downtown and was unveiled in 1998, the inaugural year of the festival.

=== Jewish songs ===
Guthrie's second wife, Marjorie Mazia, was born Marjorie Greenblatt, and her mother Aliza Greenblatt was a well-known Yiddish poet. Guthrie wrote numerous Jewish lyrics that can be linked to his close collaborative relationship with Aliza Greenblatt, who lived near Guthrie and his family in Brooklyn in the 1940s. Guthrie, the Oklahoma troubadour, and Greenblatt, the Jewish wordsmith, often discussed their artistic projects and critiqued each other's works, finding common ground in their shared love of culture and social justice. Their collaboration flourished in 1940s Brooklyn, where Jewish culture was interwoven with music, modern dance, poetry, and anti-fascist, pro-labor, socialist activism. Guthrie was inspired to write songs that arose from this unlikely relationship; he identified the problems of Jews with those of his fellow Oklahomans and other oppressed peoples.

These lyrics were rediscovered by Nora Guthrie and were set to music by the Jewish Klezmer group The Klezmatics with the release of Happy Joyous Hanukkah on JMG Records in 2007. The Klezmatics also released Wonder Wheel – Lyrics by Woody Guthrie, an album of spiritual lyrics put to music composed by the band. The album, produced by Danny Blume, was awarded a Grammy Award for Best Contemporary World Music Album.

=== Legacy ===
For his musical contributions to the Bonneville Columbia River project, on April 6, 1966, Interior Secretary Stewart Udall awarded the hospitalized Guthrie, in absentia, the Department of Interior's Conservation Service Award. Additionally, Udall announced the naming of a Bonneville electrical substation after Guthrie.

Since his death, artists have paid tribute to Guthrie by covering his songs or by dedicating songs to him. On January 20, 1968, three months after Guthrie's death, Harold Leventhal produced A Tribute to Woody Guthrie at New York City's Carnegie Hall. Performers included Jack Elliott, Pete Seeger, Tom Paxton, Bob Dylan and The Band, Judy Collins, Arlo Guthrie, Richie Havens, Odetta, and others. Leventhal repeated the tribute on September 12, 1970, at the Hollywood Bowl with Joan Baez, Pete Seeger, Arlo Guthrie, Country Joe McDonald, Odetta, Richie Havens, Ramblin' Jack Elliot, Peter Fonda and Will Geer. Recordings of both concerts were eventually released as LPs and later combined into one CD. A film of the Hollywood Bowl concert was discovered and issued as a DVD in 2019: "Woody Guthrie All-Star Tribute Concert 1970"—(MVD Visual. MVD2331D, 2019).

The Irish folk singer Christy Moore was also strongly influenced by Woody Guthrie in his seminal 1972 album Prosperous, giving renditions of "The Ludlow Massacre" and Bob Dylan's "Song to Woody". Dylan also penned the poem Last Thoughts on Woody Guthrie as a tribute. Andy Irvine—Moore's bandmate in Irish folk group Planxty and lifelong admirer of Guthrie—wrote his tribute song "Never Tire of the Road" (released on the album Rain on the Roof), which includes the chorus from a song Guthrie recorded in March 1944: "You Fascists Are Bound to Lose". In 1986, Irvine also recorded both parts of Guthrie's "The Ballad of Tom Joad" together as a complete song—under the title of "Tom Joad"—on the first album released by his other band, Patrick Street. Bruce Springsteen also performed a cover of Guthrie's "This Land is Your Land" on his live album Live 1975–1985. In the introduction to the song, Springsteen referred to it as "just about one of the most beautiful songs ever written".

In 1979, Sammy Walker's LP Songs From Woody's Pen was released by Folkways Records. Though the original recordings of these songs date back more than 30 years, Walker sings them in a traditional folk-revivalist manner reminiscent of Guthrie's social conscience and sense of humor. Speaking of Guthrie, Walker said: "I can't think of hardly anyone who has had as much influence on my own singing and songwriting as Woody."

In September 1996, Cleveland's Rock and Roll Hall of Fame and Museum and Case Western Reserve University cohosted Hard Travelin': The Life and Legacy of Woody Guthrie, a 10-day conference of panel sessions, lectures, and concerts. The conference became the first in what would become the museum's annual American Music Masters Series conference. Highlights included Arlo Guthrie's keynote address, a Saturday night musical jamboree at Cleveland's Odeon Theater, and a Sunday night concert at Severance Hall, the home of the Cleveland Orchestra. Musicians performing over the course of the conference included Arlo Guthrie, Bruce Springsteen, Billy Bragg, Pete Seeger, Ramblin' Jack Elliott, the Indigo Girls, Ellis Paul, Jimmy LaFave, Ani DiFranco, and others. In 1999, Wesleyan University Press published a collection of essays from the conference and DiFranco's record label, Righteous Babe, released a compilation of the Severance Hall concert, Til We Outnumber 'Em, in 2000.

From 1999 to 2002, the Smithsonian Institution Traveling Exhibition Service presented the traveling exhibit, This Land Is Your Land: The Life and Legacy of Woody Guthrie. In collaboration with Nora Guthrie, the Smithsonian exhibition draws from rarely seen objects, illustrations, film footage, and recorded performances to reveal a complex man who was at once poet, musician, protester, idealist, itinerant hobo, and folk legend.

In 2003, Jimmy LaFave produced a Woody Guthrie tribute show called Ribbon of Highway, Endless Skyway. The ensemble show toured around the country and included a rotating cast of singer-songwriters individually performing Guthrie's songs. Interspersed between songs were Guthrie's philosophical writings read by a narrator. In addition to LaFave, members of the rotating cast included Ellis Paul, Slaid Cleaves, Eliza Gilkyson, Joel Rafael, husband-wife duo Sarah Lee Guthrie (Woody Guthrie's granddaughter) and Johnny Irion, Michael Fracasso, and The Burns Sisters. Oklahoma songwriter Bob Childers, sometimes called "the Dylan of the Dust", served as narrator.

When word spread about the tour, performers began contacting LaFave, whose only prerequisite was to have an inspirational connection to Guthrie. Each artist chose the Guthrie songs that he or she would perform as part of the tribute. LaFave said, "It works because all the performers are Guthrie enthusiasts in some form". The inaugural performance of the Ribbon of Highway tour took place on February 5, 2003, at the Ryman Auditorium in Nashville. The abbreviated show was a featured segment of Nashville Sings Woody, yet another tribute concert to commemorate the music of Woody Guthrie held during the Folk Alliance Conference. The cast of Nashville Sings Woody, a benefit for the Woody Guthrie Foundation and Archives, also included Arlo Guthrie, Marty Stuart, Nanci Griffith, Guy Clark, Ramblin' Jack Elliott, Janis Ian, and others.

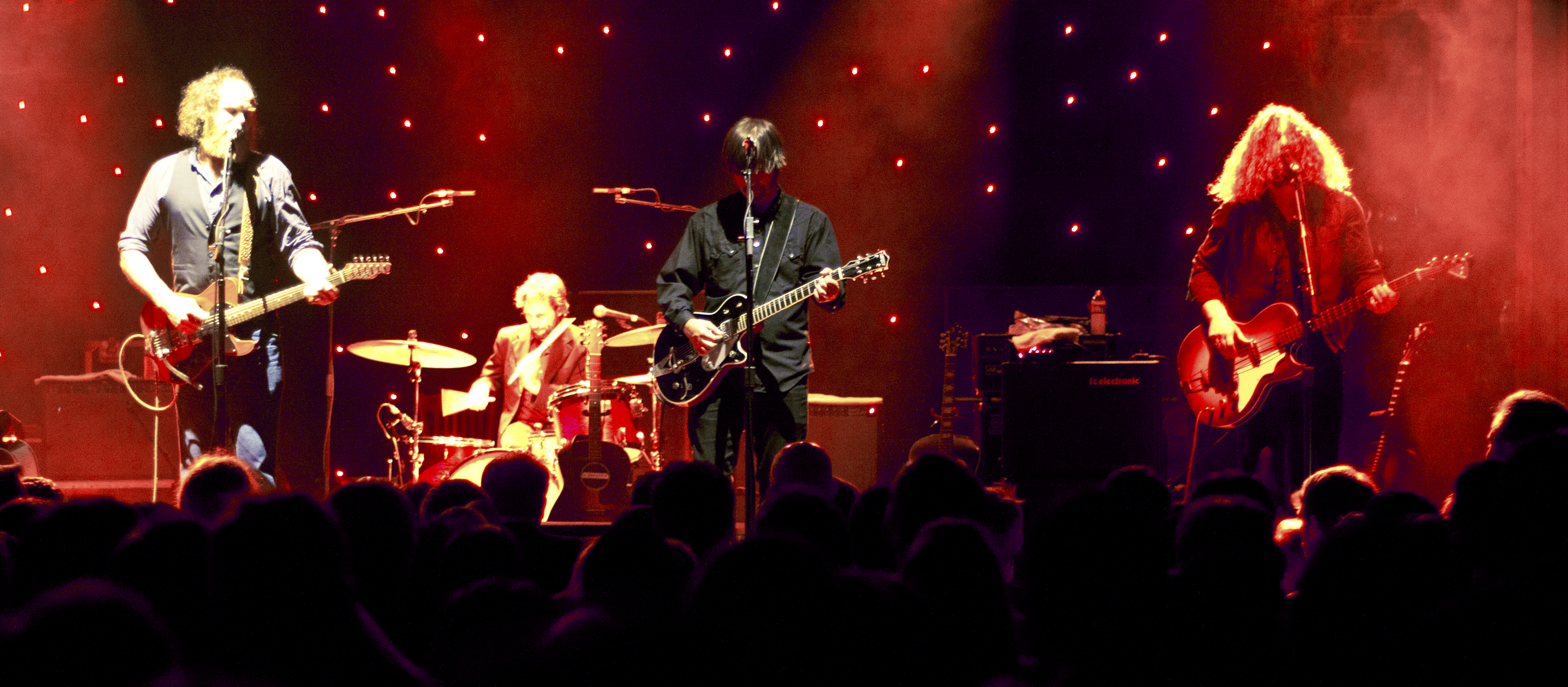
As a part of Guthrie's centennial celebrations, the New Multitudes performers played compositions including his lyrics at Webster Hall in New York City (from left to right: Anders Parker, Will Johnson [drumming], Jay Farrar, and Yim Yames)

Woody and Marjorie Guthrie were honored at a musical celebration featuring Billy Bragg and the band Brad on October 17, 2007, at Webster Hall in New York City. Steve Earle also performed. The event was hosted by actor/activist Tim Robbins to benefit the Huntington's Disease Society of America to commemorate the organization's 40th Anniversary.

In I'm Not There, a 2007 biographical movie about Bob Dylan, one of the characters introduced in the film as segments of Dylan's life is a young African-American boy who calls himself "Woody Guthrie". The purpose of this particular character was a reference to Dylan's youthful obsession with Guthrie. The fictional Woody also reflects the fictitious autobiographies that Dylan constructed during his early career as he established his own artistic identity. In the film there is even a scene where the fictional Woody visits the real Woody Guthrie as he lies ill and dying in a hospital in New York (a reference to the times when a nineteen-year-old Dylan would regularly visit his idol, after learning of his whereabouts, while he was hospitalized in New York in the 1960s). Later, a sketch on Saturday Night Live would spoof these visits, alleging that Dylan stole the line, "They'll stone you for playing your guitar!" from Guthrie.

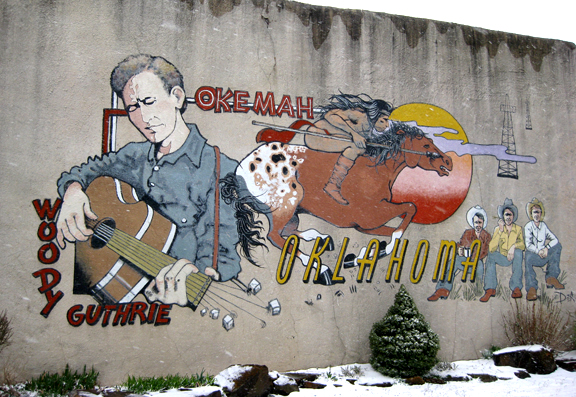
Guthrie has continued to remain popular decades after his death; this mural was painted in his hometown of Okemah in 1994

Pete Seeger had the Sloop Woody Guthrie built for an organization he founded, the Hudson River Sloop Clearwater. It was launched in 1978. Now operated by the Beacon Sloop Club, it serves to educate people about sailing and the history and environs of the Hudson River.

In 1988, Guthrie was inducted into the Rock and Roll Hall of Fame, and, in 2000, he was honored with the Grammy Lifetime Achievement Award. Guthrie was inducted into the Oklahoma Music Hall of Fame in 1997. In 2006, Guthrie was inducted into the Oklahoma Hall of Fame. In 1987, "Roll on Columbia" was chosen as the official Washington State Folk Song, and in 2001 Guthrie's "Oklahoma Hills" was chosen to be the official state folk song of Oklahoma.

On June 26, 1998, as part of its Legends of American Music series, the United States Postal Service issued 45 million 32-cent stamps honoring folk musicians Huddie Ledbetter, Guthrie, Sonny Terry and Josh White. The four musicians were represented on sheets of 20 stamps.

In July 2001, CB's Gallery in New York City began hosting an annual Woody Guthrie Birthday Bash concert featuring multiple performers. This event moved to the Bowery Poetry Club in 2007 after CB's Gallery and CBGB, its parent club, closed. The final concert in the series took place on July 14, 2012, Guthrie's 100th birthday.

In January 2005, Canadian hip-hop artist Buck 65 released This Right Here Is Buck 65. Track 8 is a cover of "Talking Fishing Blues".

In 2006, The Klezmatics set Jewish lyrics written by Guthrie to music. The resulting album, Wonder Wheel, won the Grammy award for best contemporary world music album.

On February 10, 2008, The Live Wire: Woody Guthrie in Performance 1949, a rare live recording released in cooperation with the Woody Guthrie Foundation, was the recipient of a Grammy Award in the category Best Historical Album. Less than two years later, Guthrie was again nominated for a Grammy in the same category with the 2009 release of My Dusty Road on Rounder Records.

In the centennial year of Guthrie's birth, another album of newly composed songs on his lyrics has been released: New Multitudes. On March 10, 2012, there was a tribute concert at the Brady Theater in Tulsa, Oklahoma. John Mellencamp, Arlo Guthrie, Sarah Lee Guthrie & Johnny Irion, the Del McCoury Band and the Flaming Lips performed.

The Grammy Museum held a tribute week in April 2012 and the Songwriters Hall of Fame a tribute in June. A four-disc box Mermaid Avenue: The Complete Sessions by Billy Bragg and Wilco, with 17 unreleased songs and a documentary, was planned for April release.

On July 10, 2012, Smithsonian Folkways released Woody at 100: The Woody Guthrie Centennial Collection, a 150-page large-format book with three CDs containing 57 tracks. The set also contains 21 previously unreleased performances and six never before released original songs, including Woody's first known—and recently discovered—recordings from 1937. The box set received two nominations for the 55th Annual Grammy Awards, including Best Historical Album and Best Boxed Or Special Limited Edition Package. It also won an Independent Music Award for Best Compilation Album in 2013.

In 2021, Home in This World: Woody Guthrie’s Dustbowl Ballads, a track-by-track remake of Dust Bowl Ballads was released featuring covers by Lee Ann Womack, Mark Lanegan, The Felice Brothers, and Waxahatchee among others.

From February 18 through May 22, 2022, the Morgan Library & Museum in Manhattan held an exhibition titled "Woody Guthrie: People Are the Song".

On September 30, 2022, Dropkick Murphys released This Machine Still Kills Fascists. The acoustic album consists of ten songs featuring unused lyrics by Guthrie. Nora Guthrie, Woody's daughter, reached out to the band giving them exclusive access to her father's archives. "I collected lyrics on all kinds of topics ... lyrics that seemed to be needed to be said — or screamed — today. Ken Casey is a master at understanding Woody's lyrics, which can be complicated, long, deadly serious, or totally ridiculous. DKM is capable of delivering them all" Nora Guthrie said.

In 2025, folk musician and professor Ellen Stekert released the archival album Camera Three, recorded in 1959 for the CBS news show of the same name, which included a version of the previously unknown and undocumented Guthrie song "High Floods & Low Waters".

== Selected discography ==
- Dust Bowl Ballads (1940) (The only non-compilation album of Guthrie's career)
- Nursery Days (1951)
- Songs to Grow on for Mother and Child (1956)
- Bound for Glory (1956)
- Ballads of Sacco & Vanzetti (1960)
- Woody Guthrie Sings Folk Songs (1962)
- Hard Travelin' (1964)
- Library of Congress Recordings (1964)
- Columbia River Collection (1987)
- This Land Is Your Land, The Asch Recordings, Vol.1 (1997)
- Muleskinner Blues, The Asch Recordings, Vol.2 (1997)
- Hard Travelin', The Asch Recordings, Vol.3 (1998)
- Buffalo Skinners, The Asch Recordings, Vol.4 (1999)
- The Live Wire: Woody Guthrie in Performance 1949 (2007)
- My Dusty Road (2009)
- Woody at 100: The Woody Guthrie Centennial Collection (2012)
- Woody at Home – Vol 1 & 2 (2025)

== See also ==
- List of songs by Woody Guthrie
- List of albums by Woody Guthrie
- List of peace activists

== Citations ==
=== General sources ===
- Cray, Ed (2004). Ramblin Man: The Life and Times of Woody Guthrie. W. W. Norton & Company. ISBN 0-393-32736-1.
- Jackson, Mark Allan (2007). Prophet Singer: The Voice and Vision of Woody Guthrie. University Press of Mississippi.
- Kaufman, Will (2011). Woody, Guthrie: American Radical. University of Illinois Press. ISBN 978-0-252-03602-6.
- Longhi, Jim (1997). Woody, Cisco and Me. Random House. ISBN 0-252-02276-9.
- Klein, Joe (1980). Woody Guthrie: A Life. Random House. ISBN 0-385-33385-4.
- Santelli, Robert (1999). Hard Travelin: The Life and Legacy of Woody Guthrie. Wesleyan University Press. ISBN 0-8195-6391-9.

== Further reading and listening ==
- Down Home Radio Show. LeadBelly & Woody Guthrie live on WNYC Radio, Dec. 1940. Audio re-broadcast of a 1940 radio show. Retrieved January 29, 2008.
- Earle, Steve. Woody Guthrie. The Nation, July 21, 2003. Retrieved January 29, 2008.
- Electronic Frontier Foundation. Scanned images of some of Woody Guthrie's original works. Retrieved January 29, 2008.
- Guthrie, Mary Jo. Woody's Road: Woody Guthrie's Letters Home, Drawings, Photos, and Other Unburied Treasures Paradigm Publishers, 2012. ISBN 978-1-61205-219-9
- Hogeland, William (March 14, 2004), "Emulating the Real and Vital Guthrie, Not St. Woody", New York Times.
- Jackson, Mark Allen. Prophet Singer: The Voice and Vision of Woody Guthrie. University Press of Mississippi, January 2007. ISBN 978-1-60473-102-6
- Kaufman, Will (2011). Woody Guthrie, American Radical. Urbana, Chicago and Springfield: The University of Illinois Press. ISBN 978-02-5203-602-6.
- La Chapelle, Peter. Is Country Music Inherently Conservative? History News Network. November 12, 2007. Retrieved January 29, 2008.
- La Chapelle, Peter. Proud to Be an Okie: Cultural Politics, Country Music, and Migration to Southern California. University of California Press, 2007. ISBN 978-0-520-24888-5 (hb); ISBN 978-0-520-24889-2 (pb)
- Library of Congress. Timeline of Woody Guthrie (1912–1967). Retrieved January 29, 2008.
- Library of Congress. Woody Guthrie and the Archive of American Folk Song: Correspondence, 1940–1950. Retrieved January 29, 2008.
- Marroquin, Danny. Walking the Long Road. PopMatters.com. August 4, 2006. Retrieved January 29, 2008.
- Pascal, Rich. "Celebrating the Real America", Canberra ACT news, sport and weather | The Canberra Times.
- Public Broadcasting Service. Woody Guthrie: Ain't Got No Home. Documentary from PBS' American Masters series, July 2006. Retrieved January 29, 2008.
- Symphony Silicon Valley Concert Recordings. David Amram's Symphonic Variations on a Song by Woody Guthrie Recorded September 30, 2007. Audio recording. Retrieved January 11, 2008.
- University of Oregon. Roll on Columbia: Woody Guthrie and the Bonneville Power Administration. Video documentary. Retrieved January 29, 2008.
- University of Virginia. Guthrie singing "This Land Is Your Land". MP3 recording. Retrieved January 29, 2008.
- WoodyGuthrie.de. Woody Guthrie Related Audio. Miscellaneous Real Audio files featuring Pete Seeger, Arlo Guthrie, Alan Lomax and others. Retrieved January 29, 2008.
