= Donald Trump in music =

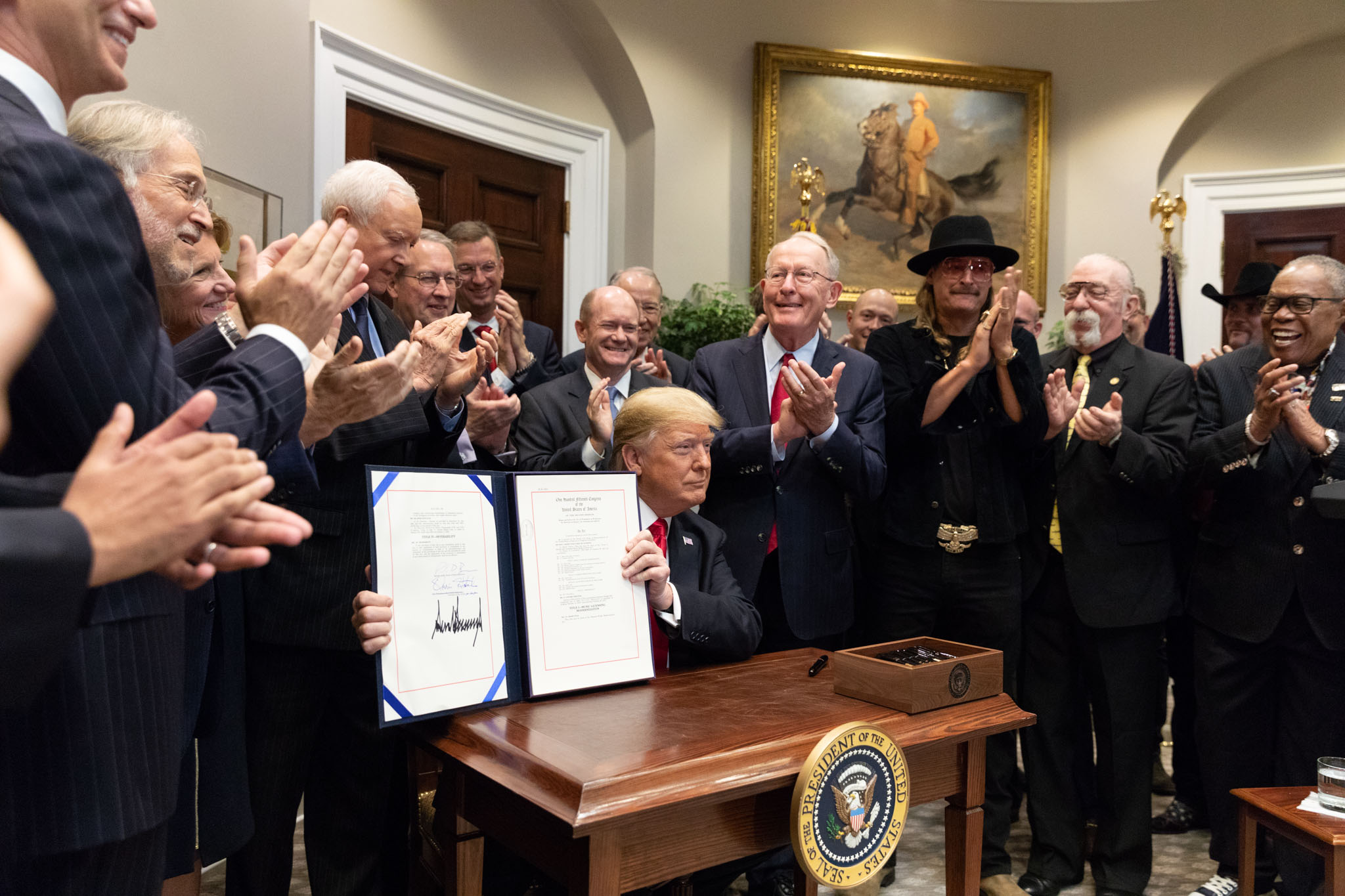
President Donald Trump signs the Music Modernization Act.

Multiple songs, albums, bands and performances have referenced Donald Trump or his various brands, including Trump Tower, his TV show, his hotel chain, and his casinos. While recent songs refer to Trump's campaign, election, and tenure as President of the United States, more than 200 songs refer to Trump prior to his campaigns for president. Most earlier references to Trump in lyrics revolve around his status as a business tycoon, but then shifted toward a stance more critical of his politics as he attempted to attain public office. With his victory in the 2016 presidential election, Trump's prominence in hip-hop music has been likened to that of Ronald Reagan's in hardcore punk during the 1980s.

== Background ==
=== Hip-hop ===
Trump's name first appeared in hip-hop lyrics during the 1980s when he became an icon of the ultra-rich. Among the earliest mentions of Trump in rap lyrics was the Beastie Boys' track "Johnny Ryall" on the 1989 album Paul's Boutique, in which they contrast Trump with his homeless alter-ego, Donald Tramp.

While many rappers early to this trend praised Trump's wealth, often as a means to compare their own financial aspirations or success to his, others used their music as a platform to criticize Trump's practices and politics. Among the earliest of these was The Coup from Oakland, California, who critiqued and mocked Trump on their first two albums released in the early 1990s.

ESPN's political site FiveThirtyEight documented that between 1989 and 2014, 19% of song lyrics about Trump were negative while 60% were positive. The 2010s marked a left-leaning political shift in musicians' attitude toward Trump as his presence in the public eye changed from that of a business tycoon to a politician, particularly one known for making controversial statements. Because of hip hop's close association with minority communities and its reinvigorated politicization with the Black Lives Matter movement, lyrical depictions of Trump rapidly grew to be more disparaging throughout his campaign and subsequent election as President of the United States.

Many artists have name-checked Trump in more than one song. Pre-presidency, Rick Ross had the most Trump mentions (nine songs between 2008 and 2015) with Nas running second (seven songs between 1996 and 2012). Other major Trump name-checkers include Migos (six songs between 2013 and 2016), Young Thug (six songs between 2013 and 2015), Lil Wayne (five songs between 2000 and 2012) and Raekwon (five songs between 1995 and 2012).

==== Mac Miller controversy ====
When Mac Miller's 2011 song "Donald Trump" became a Billboard hit, Trump released a YouTube video congratulating the rapper:

A lot of people are calling me about the Mac Miller rap song. Now, it's named "Donald Trump." Maybe you should pay me a lot of money, but it just did over 20 million people, tuning into Mac Miller. So in one way, I'm proud of him. I haven't actually seen the language... Probably, it's not the cleanest language you've ever heard... But the "Donald Trump" song just hit over 20 million, that's not so bad. I'm very proud of him.

As the song garnered more plays, Trump took a more aggressive tone and demanded royalties for using his name, thereby starting a feud with Miller. In early 2013, Trump taunted and threatened legal action against the rapper via a series of exchanges on Twitter. By 2015, Trump changed his attitude toward Miller again when he ended an interview with The Hill by praising Miller's song as it approached 100 million hits. Miller later appeared on The Nightly Show with Larry Wilmore to denounce Trump for his racial views during his run for president in 2016.

==== Eminem ====
In 2004, Trump endorsed Eminem in a mock presidential national convention to promote satellite radio station Shade 45. On October 10, 2017, Eminem performed a freestyle rap titled "The Storm" at the 2017 BET Hip Hop Awards, criticizing President Trump. The freestyle went viral, garnering millions of views and hundreds of thousands of likes on YouTube within weeks. Eminem's Revival has many lines critiquing Trump's presidential campaign and election, calling him a racist, a Nazi, and Adolf Hitler – among other incendiary insults and a fantasy in which the rapper is "framed" for murdering Ivanka Trump. He also raps about his regret at having collaborated with Trump in his promotion for Shade 45.

On "The Ringer" from his 2018 album Kamikaze, Eminem apologizes for alienating fans who supported Trump, and says that he was questioned by the U.S. Secret Service for his seemingly threatening lyrics. This led BuzzFeed to file a Freedom of Information Act request with the Secret Service to find out if the claim was true. In October 2019, the agency revealed that, in response to an email from a TMZ employee pressing the agency to investigate Eminem for his "threatening lyrics" about Ivanka Trump, they had conducted a background check and arranged an interview, in which the interviewers read the verse out loud to Eminem – and he rapped along. The agency subsequently decided against referring the case to a federal prosecutor.

=== Other genres of popular music ===
Outside of hip hop, most lyrical references to Trump have appeared in songs ranging from satires of the billionaire, to outright protest in varying degrees of explicitness. One of the earliest Trump send-ups was the 1990 ballad "Donald Trump (Black Version)" written by Prince for fellow Minneapolis act the Time in which singer Morris Day calls himself a Black version of Donald Trump, who can use his riches to "fulfill [a woman's] every wish, [and her] every dream". In 1992, Irish folk-rock group Goats Don't Shave had a #4 hit with "Las Vegas in the Hills of Donegal," which references Trump's casino business in imagining an Irish county that becomes a gambling mecca.

More recently, songs like "Fergus Laing" by English folk singer Richard Thompson present thinly veiled references to Trump without mentioning him by name, while songs like "Fucked Up Donald" by Canadian punk band D.O.A. are more direct. Many songs attack Trump by mocking his supporters through stereotypical portrayals of their views and lifestyles. Phoenix-based comedian Brian Nissen comedian stars as "Mullets Over America" spokesman Dwain in the music video "Make America Great Again", while Rocky Mountain Mike's cover of "Mr. Tambourine Man" remakes the lyrics to be about Trump, with the song's title alluding to the color of his skin. Sung from the perspective of a xenophobic Trump supporter, the song opens:

Hey Mr. Tangerine Man, build a wall for me

I'm not that bright and don't know that you're not going to Hey Mr. Tangerine Man, keep Muslims away from me

With my jingoistic worldview, I'll come following you.

In October 2016, author Dave Eggers launched a project slated to release one anti-Trump song each day leading up to 2016's election day. Originally called 30 Songs, 30 Days, Eggers' plan was to have each song performed by a different artist, but due to more musicians coming through with songs, it grew to be 40, and then 50 songs in 30 days. Eggers worked on the project with Jordan Kurland with whom he had previously worked on two similar election-related projects. Eggers' inspiration for the project came when attending a Trump rally in Sacramento earlier that year. Participating artists included Death Cab for Cutie, Aimee Mann, Bhi Bhiman, Jim James, Franz Ferdinand, Josh Ritter, Thao Nguyen, EL VY, R.E.M., Adia Victoria, Moby, Lila Downs, Mac McCaughan, Tim Bluhm, Vinnie Paz, Jesu, Sun Kil Moon, Filthy Friends, Radioinactive, Ani DiFranco, Andrew Bird, Mirah, clipping., Sam Cohen, Blake Hazard, Wesley Stace, Loudon Wainwright III, Cold War Kids, Reggie Watts, Mission of Burma, Bob Mould, Ryan Miller, The Long Winters, Open Mike Eagle, Jimmy Eat World, Kyle Craft, Local Natives, Anthony D'Amato, Greg Holden, Laura Gibson, Tim Heidecker, Modern Baseball, Joe Purdy, and Rogue Wave.

In June 2017, Compound Sound LLC released Trumped Music, a 32-minute album of eight songs which are fair use parodies of famous hit songs throughout the years. These songs are sung by impressionist Christopher John as "Donald Trump", with several tracks also featuring impressionist Andrew Harris as "Vladimir Putin".

In 2023 Sparks bassist Martin Gordon treated the transcript of Trump's phone call to Georgia secretary of State Brad Raffensperger as input for a 31-song collection entitled 'Another Words', and in April 2024 delivered a paper at the University of Art, Zurich, Switzerland (Hochschule der Kunste) on using inherent rhythmic structures found in Trump's extemporised speeches as the basis for a basis for developing asymmetric heterometric temporal structures in music composition.

=== Opera ===
At the 2017 Lowlands Festival in the Netherlands, the American coloratura soprano Sara Hershkowitz performed György Ligeti's 1992 concert excerpts from his opera Le Grand Macabre, titled Mysteries of the Macabre, with the Noord Nederlands Orkest. She alluded to Donald Trump in three costumes which she changed on stage: a clown, baby outfit with a bottle, and a beauty pageant swimsuit, the last a reference to his previous ownership of the Miss Universe organisation.

== List of songs that mention Donald Trump ==
=== 1980s ===
- "Johnny Ryall" by Beastie Boys (1989): "Donald Trump and Donald Tramp living in the men's shelter"
- "My Word Is Bond" by Donald D (1989): "And after that me and Donald Trump hung out / Donald talkin' 'bout Donald Trump,' man, y'all is crazy"
- "Lie-Z" by The Fat Boys (1989): "I got money like Donald Trump!"
- "Powrót Donalda" by Polish synth-pop band Ex-Dance (1987)
- "Trump" by Cindy Lee Berryhill (1989), from the Rhino Records album Naked Movie Star.
- "Sick of You" by Lou Reed (1989) from New York: "They ordained the Trumps and then he got the mumps..."

=== 1990s ===
- "Donald Trump (Black Version)" by The Time (1990): "Donald Trump (black version), come on take a chance / A 1990s love affair, the real romance"
- "I Gotta Say What Up" by Ice Cube (1990): "I gotta say what's up to Digital Underground and Humpty Hump / Cause he makin' more than Donald Trump, you know what I'm sayin', yo"
- "Skin Trade" by Nice (1990): "I'm not rich like Donald Trump"
- "Get Dumb! (Free Your Body)" by The Crew featuring Freedom Williams (1990): "I'm donaldtrumpin' gettin' paid buildin' somethin'"
- "Tale o' the Twister" by Chagall Guevara (1990): "Up on the roof of Trump Tower / She said, 'It's yours on a trade-in'"
- "Skypager" by A Tribe Called Quest (1991): "Beeper's goin off like Don Trump gets checks"
- "Quote Unquote" by Mr. Bungle (1991): "With his mouth sewn shut, he still shakes his butt / 'Cause he's Hitler and Swayze and Trump and Travolta"
- "The Wasteland" by Warrior Soul (1991): "Donald Trump is just a money whore"
- "Money and the Power" by Scarface (1991): "Rolling hard, stackin paper like Trump"
- "No Nose Job" by Digital Underground (1992): "Now Cube says you're making more than Donald Trump / So yo, go on and get your nose fixed, Hump."
- "Panhandlin' Prince" by Ugly Kid Joe (1992): "Mr. Trump, can I ask you a question, you got some spare some change for me, sucka?"
- "Pocket Full of Stones" by UGK (1992): "Call me Black Trump"
- "Da Funk" by Redman (1992): "I'm back with the funk, chump / You want funk, how many lumps? / I got spunk / I'm well known like Donald Trump"
- "Jussummen" by Das EFX (1992): "I'm quick to break a slut like Donald Trump can break a million / Or zillion, I kills 'em, I watches all My Children"
- "Las Vegas (In the Hills of Donegal)" by Goats Don't Shave (1992): "Inishowen could then be known for its multimillionaires / Where Donald Trump would like a chunk to live in solitaire"
- "Smart Like Einstein" by Little Charlie and the Nightcats (1993): "I was smart like Einstein, rich like Donald Trump".
- The Coup's eponymous song from their debut album Kill My Landlord (1993): "Break yourself Bush, it's collection day / Break yourself Trump, it's collection day / Break yourself DuPont, it's collection day / You stole the shit from my great granddaddy anyway"
- "Pimps (Free Stylin at the Fortune 500 Club)" by The Coup (1994): "Trump Trump check out the cash in my trunk/I am Donald Trump me think you mighta heard about me/How me last wife Ivana come and catch me money"
- "211" by Master P (1994): "Put more cash in my pockets than Donald Trump"
- "Incarcerated Scarfaces" by Raekwon (1995): "But yo, guess who's the black Trump?"
- "Protect Ya Neck II The Zoo" by Ol' Dirty Bastard (1995): "Warning you chump, brain is out for lunch/Given the power punch, soon to be paid like Donald Trump"
- "Money Talks" by Double X Posse (1995): "A bank account so fat that Donald Trump would wanna be me"
- "Paid" by Kid Rock (1996): "I'd still be in the house getting paid like Trump"
- "Three Strikes You In" by Ice Cube (1998): "I'm just tryin' to get rich like Trump"
- "Tell Me What You're Lookin' For" by Kane & Abel (group) (1998): "1008 grams in the trunk, that's a kilo for you punks / Kane and Abel in this bitch getting rich like Trump"
- "Mafioso" by Kool G Rap (1998): "Can't stop until I got a casa up in Trump plaza"
- "Trump Change" by E-40 (1998): "Trump change, I'm talking Donald Trump change / I'm talking Steve Wynn, I'm talking you know? E-Feezee"
- "Tru Master" by Pete Rock (1998): "In hot pursuit of Donald Trump rap loot"
- "Get Back" by Zebrahead (1998): "Got to get the dough like my man Donald Trump"
- Paper Bag Thoughts" by DJ Clue? featuring Raekwon (1998): "Hear me yo; wild Trump style"
- "Money Is My Bitch" by Nas (1999): "The best couple they seen since Trump and Marla Maples"
- "Speed Law" by Mos Def (1999): "Rocked the Trump Tower to the terrordome"
- "Muzzle Toe" by Wu-Syndicate (1999): "It's reg or not, pockets love Trump Donald"
- "Hova Interlude" by Jay-Z (1999): "Well, I'm the ghetto's answer to Trump"

=== 2000s ===
- "Love on Haight Street" by BT with Rasco and Fifty Grand (2000): "Took me twelve months to stack money in lumps / Far from livin' foul but further from Don Trump"
- "Country Grammar (Hot Shit)" by Nelly (2000): "Let me in, now / Let me in now / Bill Gates, Donald Trump let me in now / Spin now, I got money to lend my friends now"
- "Bad Boyz" by Shyne (2000): "What type of nigga stay in the Trump for weeks? (Bad Boyz)"
- "Can I Live" by Cypress Hill (2001): "We tryna get money so we can be livin' like Trump"
- "Get Paid" by Styles P. (2001): "Tryin' to see my sh*t in the Forbes; Trump tower for 'self." – Styles P, 2001, A Gentleman and a Gangster.
- "Hip Hop Quotables" by Ludacris (2003): "I buy cars with straight cash, have meetings with Donald Trump"
- "What More Can I Say" by Jay Z (2003): "I'm at the Trump International: ask for me I ain't never scared"
- "Playas Only" by R. Kelly (2005): "Bet she ain't never seen a penthouse at the Trump / Me and are been around the world and we'll give it to you just how you like it girl" Google Play. Retrieved February 16, 2017
- "Thug Motivation 101" by Jeezy (2005): "I'm Donald Trump in a white tee and white 1's"
- "Good Morning" by Cage (2005): "Donald Trump, shotgun pump, illegal store fronts"
- "Shut Up Bitch" by Lil' Kim (2005): "I'm in the Trump International, 30 floors up (so high)"
- "It's Goin' Down" by Yung Joc (2006): "Boys in the hood call me black Donald Trump"
- "Jealousy" by Fat Joe (2006): "We fuckin with Donald Trump now"
- "Heavy Metal Kings" by Jedi Mind Tricks (2006): "I'm like Trump in The Apprentice, only fire at night!"
- "The Format" by AZ (2006):"From Bed-Stuy to the East, I'm too at peace to lose it / But love it, I still does it, breathing off a Trump budget"
- "We Gon' Make It" by Diddy (2006): "I spend absurd money, private bird money/That Bill Gates, Donald Trump, Bloomberg money"
- "Free Radicals" by The Flaming Lips (2006): "You're turning into / A poor man's Donald Trump / I know those circumstances make you wanna jump"
- "The Morning News" by Chamillionaire (2007): "Rosie O'Donnell and Donald Trump stay arguin' about nonsense"
- "American Wedding" by Gogol Bordello (2007): "So be Donald Trump, or be an anarchist. Make sure that your wedding doesn't end up like this!"
- "Mo Cars, Mo Hoes" by Fabolous (2008): "They know I'm hood rich, Donald Trump of the pumpers"
- "Quasi O.G" by shyne (2004): Catch me in Trump tower, with a hundred in power"
- "This is the Life" by Rick Ross (2008): "I'm in Trump Towers, amongst earners"
- "Donald Trump's Hair" (2009) by Kacey Jones
- "F.U.$" by Danger Danger (2009): "I wanna be a famous jet-set billionaire, just like Donald Trump, with better hair"
- "96,000" From In the Heights by Lin-Manuel Miranda: "Donald Trump and I on the links and he's my caddy"

=== 2010–2015 ===
- "So Appalled" by Kanye West (2010): "Balding Donald Trump taking dollars from y'all"
- "Get It" by Big Sean and Pharrell (2010): "I'm tryna stuff em until I can't fit no more. I'm talking Donald Trump level"
- "Listen to My Drama" by Ivy Queen (2010): "Yo soy fina como Gucci, la heredera de Donald Trump / I am fine like Gucci, Donald Trump's heiress"
- "Donald Trump" by Mac Miller (2011)
- "Trump" by Young Jeezy (2011): "Call me Donald Trump / The type that count my money while I smoke a blunt"
- "Rax" by Lil Wayne (2011): "Get money like Donald Trump"
- "Gucci Gucci" by Kreayshawn (2012): "I'm looking like Madonna but I'm flossing like Ivana Trump"
- "I Need Dollas" by T.I. (2012): "Used to want dough like Jay-Z, but now I'm thinking Donald Trump"
- "Loco-Motive" by Nas (2012): "I started out broke, got rich, lost paper then made it back / Like Trump bein' up down up, play with cash"
- "Ball" by Lil Wayne and T.I. (2012): "I'ma fire my blunt like Donald Trump"
- "Google That" by Raekwon (2012): "Black Trump... with fat pockets"
- "Pirates" by Rick Ross (2012): "Resurrection of the real, time to get the richer than Trump"
- "I Wanna Be With You" by Nicki Minaj with DJ Khaled (2013): "At the Trump, and you bitches at the Radisson"
- "Karate Chop" by Shaquille O'Neal (2013): "You ain't got enough, better get a loan from Mr. Bill Gates / And Donald Trump and Carlos Slim"
- "Loaded" by Young Thug (2013): "Plottin' on Donald Trump!"
- "Donald Trump Walk" by Jerry James (2013): "I'mma make them bottles pop / Donald Trump talk"
- "Off the Corner" by Meek Mill (2014): "Going Donald Trump numbers on the corner/I made a million on that corner"
- "Donald Trump" by Young Thug (2014): "Donald Trump, I made / Forbes list this month!"
- "What We Doing" by Fat Trel (2014): "What we countin'? (hundred thousands) / Where we at? (Trump Towers)"
- "Up Like Trump" by Rae Sremmurd (2015): "Forbes list, Forbes / Read it like the Bible / Up like Donald Trump"

=== 2015–2016, during Trump's presidential race and election ===
- "Black Friday" by Kendrick Lamar (2015): "I'm the son of the pioneer that got you near the sun / Play with him, bitch you better off voting for Donald Trump"
- "El Chapo" by The Game (2015): "This is goons day, I can have Guadalupe / Come through and knock Donald Trump out his toupee"
- "Free Enterprises" by Rick Ross (2015): "Assassinate Trump like I'm Zimmerman"
- "Bad Boy on Death Row" by Dave East (2016): "Donald Trump ain't safe on my block, gotcha your wifey at IHOP"
- "Mr. Tangerine Man" by Rocky Mountain Mike (2016)
- "Nobody Speak" by DJ Shadow featuring Run the Jewels (2016): "Flame your crew quicker than Trump fucks his youngest"
- "FDT" YG & Nipsey Hussle (2016): "Fuck Donald Trump"
- "FDT Pt. 2" by G-Eazy (2016): "A Trump rally sounds like Hitler in Berlin or KKK shit, now I'm goin' in"
- "Free Steven Avery (Wrong America)" (2016) by Cabbage: "Death to Donald Trump/ Death to Donald Trump/ There's something about politics in America/ Death to Donald Trump/ Death to Donald Trump/ There's something about politics in America..."
- 30 Days, 50 Songs project, released daily between October 10 and November 8, 2016 by Dave Eggers and Jordan Kurland, including notably:
  - "Million Dollar Loan" by Death Cab for Cutie
  - "Mr. Tangerine Man [live]" by Wesley Stace
  - "I Might Vote 4 Donald Trump" by JPEGMafia ft. Freaky
- "Viva Presidente Trump" by Brujeria (2016)
- "Donald Trump" by Upchurch
- "Conrad Tokyo" by A Tribe Called Quest featuring Kendrick Lamar (2016): "Move with the fuckery / Trump and the SNL hilarity"
- "See Me Down" by Lil Durk featuring Jadakiss (2016): "Let's face it/ If Donald Trump win the spot, then we back to the basics"
- "Black Barbies" by Nicki Minaj and Mike WiLL Made-it (2016): "Island girl, Donald Trump want me go home"

=== 2017–2021, during Trump's first term ===
- "Trump Talkin' Nukes" by Tim Heidecker, released February 9, 2017 as a part of Our First 100 Days.
- "Fuck You Donald Trump" by Sharptooth released on September 27, 2017
- "I Burn but I am not Consumed" composed and performed by Karine Polwart with BBC Scottish Symphony Orchestra for Celtic Connections, Thursday 19 January 2017 and subsequently included on her "Laws of Motion" album.
- "No Smoke" by Roc Marciano & Knowledge the Pirate: "Somewhere in Fiji, sippin' mojitos and martinis / While Trump tweetin' quotes from Mussolini"
- "No Es Mi Presidente" by Taina Asili Y La Banda Rebelde
- "Tear Down That Wall" by The Bright Light Social Hour
- "Tiny Hands" by Fiona Apple
- "No Favors" by Big Sean & Eminem: "I'm anti, can't no government handle a commando / Your man don't want it, Trump's a bitch! / I'll make his whole brand go under"
- "Land of the Free" by Joey Badass (2017): "Obama just wasn't enough, I just need some more closure / And Donald Trump is not equipped to take this country over"
- "Rockabye Baby" by Joey Badass (2017): "Time is running up, feel the burn in my gut / And if you got the guts, scream, 'Fuck Donald Trump'"
- "Santa Please" by Miss Eaves (2017): "Impeach for Christmas Impeach for Chanukah Impeach for Solstice Impeach for Kwanzaa One thing I need One thing I want Impeachment Impeach Trump"
- "Legendary" by deadmau5 & Shotty Horroh (2017): "Tried to give her draws of the proper skunk / But she prefer the whites like Donald Trump"
- "The Heart Part 4" by Kendrick Lamar: "Donald Trump is a chump / Know how we feel, punk?"
- "Tin Foil Hat" by Todd Rundgren featuring Donald Fagen
- "I'm Not Racist" by Joyner Lucas (2017)
- "XXX." by Kendrick Lamar (2017): "Donald Trump's in office / We lost Barack and promised never to doubt him again"
- "Thug Life" by 21 Savage (2017): "All my tint presidential, like I'm Trump, dawg"
- "Set Up Shop (Remix)" by Lil Baby and Marlo featuring Young Thug (2017): "I wanna be a billionaire/ I ain't got no problem with Donald Trump"
- "Like Home", "Framed", and "Heat" by Eminem (2017) from his Revival album: "Grab you by the *meow*, hope it's not a problem, in fact / About the only thing I agree on with Donald is that"
- "Gays 4 Donald" by Pink Guy (2017)
- "Dining At The Trump" written by Cude & Pickens (2017) for the album Bobby Lee's Good American Musical Show. Bobby Lee Cude, Hard Hat Records, CEO
- "Diamond Duck" by Maraaya (2017)
- "hate will never win" by XXXTentacion (2017) samples Donald Trump's Charlottesville speech.
- "In Charlotte" by Young Dolph (2017): " I got niggas hate me like I'm Donald Trump"
- "Losing My Life" by Falling in Reverse: "I respawn like I have a reset button, hated more than Trump is" (2018)
- "Ye vs. the People" by Kanye West featuring T.I. (2018): "But ever since Trump won, it proved that I could be president".
- "Uproar" by Lil Wayne (2018): "Listenin' to Bono, you listen to Donald".
- "Another Year" by Shad, Eternia & Ian Kamau (2018): "Trump is in charge, and they trump up the charges"
- "Love It If We Made It" by The 1975 (2018): "'I moved on her like a bitch!' / Excited to be indicted / Unrequited house with seven pools / 'Thank you Kanye, very cool!'"
- "15 (Intro)" by Bhad Bhabie (2018) "That's a lump sum, sweaty bitches Trump dumb"
- "KITTY KITTY" by De Staat (2018): Various lyrics alluding to Trump and his campaign policies, (such as "Big deal maker, orange entertainer, swamp it up, 'gator" and "Make the new news faker"). The song's music video depicts two crowds of people charging towards each other in slow motion, with the two groups coloured blue (to represent the Democratic Party) and red (representing the Republican Party).
- "Let Me Out" by Gorillaz (2018): Donald Trump's name is mentioned, but censored, because writer Damon Albarn did not want to give the "most famous man on earth any more fame".
- "Veins" by Earl Sweatshirt (2018): "Stuck in Trump Land, watching subtlety decayin'"
- "Die" by Badflower (2018): "Fuck you, Donny Boy!"
- "Arrest the President" by Ice Cube (2018): "Arrest the president, you got the evidence, That nigga is Russian intelligence (Okay)"
- "Mama" by Clean Bandit feat. Ellie Goulding (2019): music video depicting life of an abused child who grows up to resemble Donald Trump and become President, but is still unhappy
- "Commotion" by Moneybagg Yo (2019): "Presidential made 'em mad like Trump (ha)"
- "Batuka" – Madonna (2019): "Get that old man / Put him in a jail / Where he can't stop us"
- "The Principal" – Melanie Martinez (2019)
- "45 (A Matter of Time)" by Sum 41 (2019): "I believe that I / Am losing faith in all of humankind / But then I realize it's plain to see / That a number is all you are to me"
- "Canals" by Highly Suspect (2019): "Donald's a bitch and Vlad Putin is too."
- FBG Duck - "Eat Freestyle" (2020) "Trump say grab em by the pussy and Im rooting for em. Summer time might buy a car and leave the roof for it
- "The Adventures of Moon Man and Slim Shady " by Kid Cudi and Eminem (2020): "Bunch of half-wits up in office".
- "Trump is your President" by Bryson Gray, Mickey Winston and David Films (2020) about the first impeachment of Donald Trump : "Donald Trump is your President, if you like it or not".
- "Virus Potus " by Vii-Pii (2020) about the Trump communication during the COVID-19 pandemic: "Shutdown Trump, we'll all get by".
- "Sunshine" by Young Dolph (2020): "my president is Trump and my Lambo blue"
- "Real One" by G Herbo featuring Lil Durk (2020): "I was pissed off at my lawyer, me and Von ain't do shows in month/ I can't blame the judge and state's attorney, 'cause both of 'em voted for Trump"
- "4 More Years" by Forgiato Blow & Colt Ford (2020)
- "MAGA STEPPING" by Bryson Gray (2020): "Trump 2020 I'm bout' that"
- "Ain't It Different " by Headie One, AJ Tracey, Stormzy, and Onefour (2020): "I'm stacking up all these funds, making paper like Donald Trump"
- "GUN TOTIN' PATRIOT" by Bryson Gray & Forgiato Blow (2020): "Trump, okay bury him a legend. Trump, okay America's biggest blessin/ Tell Jesse Smollett that I know this MAGA Country"
- "Quick Escape" by Pearl Jam (2020): "The lengths we had to go to then to find a place Trump hadn't fucked up yet"
- "Border Inside My Heart" by Watsky (2020): "Donald J. Trump is a thug and a plague / and if he signed your check, you belong at The Hague"
- "Dirty Little Virus" by Iggy Pop (2020): "Grandfather's dead, got Trump instead"
- "Commander in Chief" by Demi Lovato (2020)
- "Chapter 319" by Clipping (2020): "Donald Trump is a white supremacist / Full stop / If you vote for him again, you're a white supremacist."

=== 2021–2024, between Trump's terms ===
- "Last Day In" by Kodak Black (2021): "Trump just freed me, but my favorite president is on the money"
- "Pleura" by King Gizzard and the Lizard Wizard (2021): "Orange baby, always squealing"
- "Everyone's an Asshole" by Badflower (2021): "If a president can prevent no evidence / And still convince a mob to riot"
- "FIX URSELF!" by JPEGMAFIA (2021): "I love my baby like Trump loves Putin, in the deepest way (Yeah)"
- "Fake Woke" by Tom MacDonald (2021): "Eminem used to gay bash and murder his mom/ And now he doesn't want fans if they voted for Trump"
- "Cancelled" by Tom MacDonald (2021): "Y'all been starting rumors, let me help you with some, yeah: / I'm a racist, I'm a sexist, I'm in love with Donald Trump"
- "We Cry Together" by Kendrick Lamar (2022): "See, you the reason for Trump!"
- "Haitian Scarface" by Kodak Black (2022): "If I make a mistake, don't bring up Trump"
- "Erael Misus 11: Abominald Trump" by Fluxusboks (2023). A 37 minute long noise/experimental track using Trump speeches as source material.
- "Dead To Rights" by Tyler Bryant & the Shakedown (2024), alluding to the various indictments against Donald Trump
- "ONBOA47RD" by Fivio Foreign, Kodak Black, & Donald Trump (2024): "They keep asking' 'bout Trump, but I don't speak on family business"
- "Fighter" by Jon Kahn (2024), alluding to the attempted assassination of Donald Trump in Pennsylvania
- "American Hero" by Lil Pump (2024) alluding to the Donald Trump 2024 presidential campaign

=== 2025–2026, during Trump's second term ===
- "Clouds" by J. Cole (2025): “I’m that bass in your trunk, the bullet that missed Trump / the gun that jammed ’cause it seemed God had other plans."
- "Streets of Minneapolis" by Bruce Springsteen (2026) blames "King Trump's private army" for violence that occurred during Operation Metro Surge in Minneapolis.
- "Ah Ha" by Cardi B (2026): "Black trucks at the club, look like Trump in this bitch (Fuck him)"

=== Pre-existing songs modified to be about Donald Trump ===
- "Born to Die," a 1982 song by Millions of Dead Cops begins with the chant "No war! No KKK! No fascist USA!" The chant was modified by American punk rock act Green Day at the 2016 American Music Awards to become, "No Trump! No KKK! No Fascist USA!" from there, the chant was taken to the streets by anti-Trump protestors.
- "Mr. Tambourine Man" by Bob Dylan (1965) was reworded to "Mr. Tangerine Man" by Rocky Mountain Mike (2016).
- "Fucked Up Donald" (2016) by Canadian punk band D.O.A. is based on their song "Fucked Up Ronnie" (1981).
- "Civil War", a song by Guns N' Roses, contains the line "Look at the fear we're feeding". Axl Rose changed this to "Look at the fear Trump's feeding" at a November 2016 performance in São Paulo during the band's Not in This Lifetime... Tour.
- The Christmas Song, (commonly subtitled "Chestnuts Roasting on an Open Fire") was reworked by Fiona Apple into "The Christmas Song (Trump's Nuts Roasting on an Open Fire)"
- "Control (Trump 45 Version)" by Dicepeople featuring The Brooklyn Foundation. In March 2018, London based dark electro band Dicepeople teamed up with Manchester's The Brooklyn Foundation for a remix of "Control", a track originally from Dicepeople's 2011 album It Gets Darker. The new "Trump 45" version of the song was released exclusively as a new politically inspired video single.
- "Donald Trump is a Wanker" is a four-voice fugue composed by Ben Comeau, based on a theme from The White Stripes' "Seven Nation Army".
- "(We Don't Need This) Fascist Groove Thang" by Heaven 17 got a 2019 update by the band during a live recording that changed the lyrics “Reagan’s president elect – Fascist god in motion” to “The orange one is president – Fascist god in motion.”
- "Hey Don" (2020) by Tony Fontana is a remake of the classic "Hey Joe" (first popularized in the Sixties by The Leaves and Jimi Hendrix), with new lyrics that refer to some controversial acts made by Donald Trump during his first Presidency and his run for the second Office. Themes of the lyrics range from his promised border wall to Trump's handling of the COVID-19 pandemic and unrest following the murder of George Floyd.
- "Nazi Punks Fuck Off", a song by the Dead Kennedys written by the band's singer Jello Biafra, was re-written by Biafra as "Nazi Trumps Fuck Off" and performed with Dead Cross.
- "American Idiot" by Green Day, modern performances of which change the line "I'm not a part of the redneck agenda" to "I'm not a part of the MAGA agenda".

== See also ==
- Musicians who oppose Donald Trump's use of their music
- Ronald Reagan in music
- WHEL, a Florida radio station branded as "Trump Country" with a Donald Trump impersonator as imaging voice
- "Old Man Trump", a 1954 folk song by Woody Guthrie critiquing Fred Trump, Donald's father
