= 1,000 Days, 1,000 Songs =

Music supergroup project

1,000 Days, 1,000 Songs (originally called 30 Days, 30 Songs, then 30 Days, 40 Songs, then 30 Days, 50 Songs) is a musical project launched on October 10, 2016, by Dave Eggers which was originally supposed to release one song per day from then until November 8, 2016, which is Election Day in the United States. Each of the songs is performed by one of 40 musicians or projects, and the songs all advocate against voting for Donald Trump in the 2016 U.S. presidential election. Eggers worked on the project with Jordan Kurland, the owner of Zeitgeist Artist Management. The two of them previously worked on two similar election-related projects, including the "90 Days, 90 Reasons" campaign in 2012. Eggers originally got the idea for the project when attending a Trump rally in Sacramento, California in June 2016. The first song in the project was "Million Dollar Loan" by Death Cab for Cutie.

== Songs ==
List of songs released for the project
No.	Artist	Song	Release date
1	Death Cab For Cutie	"Million Dollar Loan"	October 10, 2016
2	Aimee Mann	"Can't You Tell?"	October 11, 2016
3	Bhi Bhiman	"With Love From Russia"	October 14, 2016
4	Jim James	"Same Old Lie"	October 13, 2016
5	Franz Ferdinand	"Demagogue"	October 14, 2016
6	Josh Ritter	"The Temptation of Adam" [live]	October 16, 2016
7	Thao	"Before You Vote"	October 16, 2016
8	EL VY	"Are These My Jets?"	October 17, 2016
9	R.E.M.	"World Leader Pretend" [live]	October 14, 2016
10	Ledinsky	"DonaldTrumpMakesMeWannaSmokeCrack [remix]"	October 18, 2016
11	Adia Victoria	"Backwards Blues"	October 19, 2016
12	Moby & The Heartland Choir	"Trump Is on Your Side"	October 20, 2016
13	Moby & The Void Pacific Choir	"Little Failure"	October 20, 2016
14	Lila Downs	"The Demagogue"	October 21, 2016
15	U.S. Elevator feat. Mac McCaughan & Tim Bluhm	"Old Man Trump"	October 22, 2016
16	Vinnie Paz	"Writings on Disobedience and Democracy"	October 23, 2016
17	Jesu/Sun Kil Moon	"The Greatest Conversation Ever in the History of the Universe"	October 24, 2016
18	Filthy Friends	"Despierta"	October 21, 2016
19	Radioinactive feat. Sheila Brody	"Natural Born Loser"	October 25, 2016
20	Andrew St. James	"Makin' It Great Again!"	October 27, 2016
21	Ani DiFranco	"Play God" [live]	October 26, 2016
22	Helado Negro	"Young, Latin and Proud"	August 3, 2015
23	Andrew Bird feat. Jim James	"Sic of Elephants" [live]	October 27, 2016
24	Mirah	"No Guns No Guns"	October 27, 2016
25	clipping.	"Fat Fingers"	October 28, 2016
26	Sam Cohen	"Clockwork"	October 28, 2016
27	Blake Hazard	"Little Situation"	October 29, 2016
28	Wesley Stace	"Mr. Tangerine Man" [live]	October 29, 2016
29	Loudon Wainwright III	"I Had a Dream" [live]	October 30, 2016
30	Cold War Kids	"Locker Room Talk"	October 30, 2016
31	The Cooties feat. Reggie Watts	"Trumpy Trump"	October 31, 2016
32	Mission of Burma	"Panic Is No Option" [live]	November 1, 2016
33	Bob Mould	"In a Free Land" [live]	November 1, 2016
34	Ryan Miller	"The Clown"	November 2, 2016
35	JPEGMafia feat. Freaky	"I Might Vote 4 Donald Trump"	May 20, 2016
36	The Long Winters	"Make America Great Again"	November 3, 2016
37	Open Mike Eagle	"How to Be Super Petty to Your Ex"	November 3, 2016
38	Jimmy Eat World	"My Enemy"	August 30, 2016
39	Kyle Craft	"Before the Wall"	August 11, 2016
40	Local Natives	"Fountain of Youth" [live]	November 5, 2016
41	Anthony D'Amato	"If You're Gonna Build a Wall"	October 21, 2016
42	Greg Holden	"Exactly Like You"	November 5, 2016
43	Laura Gibson and Dave Depper	"And Where Were You?"	November 6, 2016
44	I Said Yes	"Alexander"	August 19, 2016
45	Tim Heidecker	"Trump's Pilot"	November 6, 2016
46	Modern Baseball	"Bart to the Future Part 2: The Musical"	November 7, 2016
47	Joe Purdy	"Maybe We'll All Get Along Someday"	June 10, 2016
48	Drunken Logic	"What a Beautiful Morning!"	November 7, 2016
49	Agents of the Fantastic	"DT Blues"	November 8, 2016
50	Rogue Wave	"Vote for Me Dummy"	November 8, 2016
51	R.E.M.	"It's the End of the World as We Know It (And I Feel Fine)" [live]	January 17, 2017
54	Bhi Bhiman	"(What's So Funny 'Bout) Peace, Love, and Understanding"	January 25, 2017
55	Jim James	"Here in Spirit"	November 18, 2016

== See also ==
- Donald Trump in music
- Our First 100 Days
