= Pied Cow Coffeehouse =

Defunct restaurant and hookah lounge in Portland, Oregon, U.S.

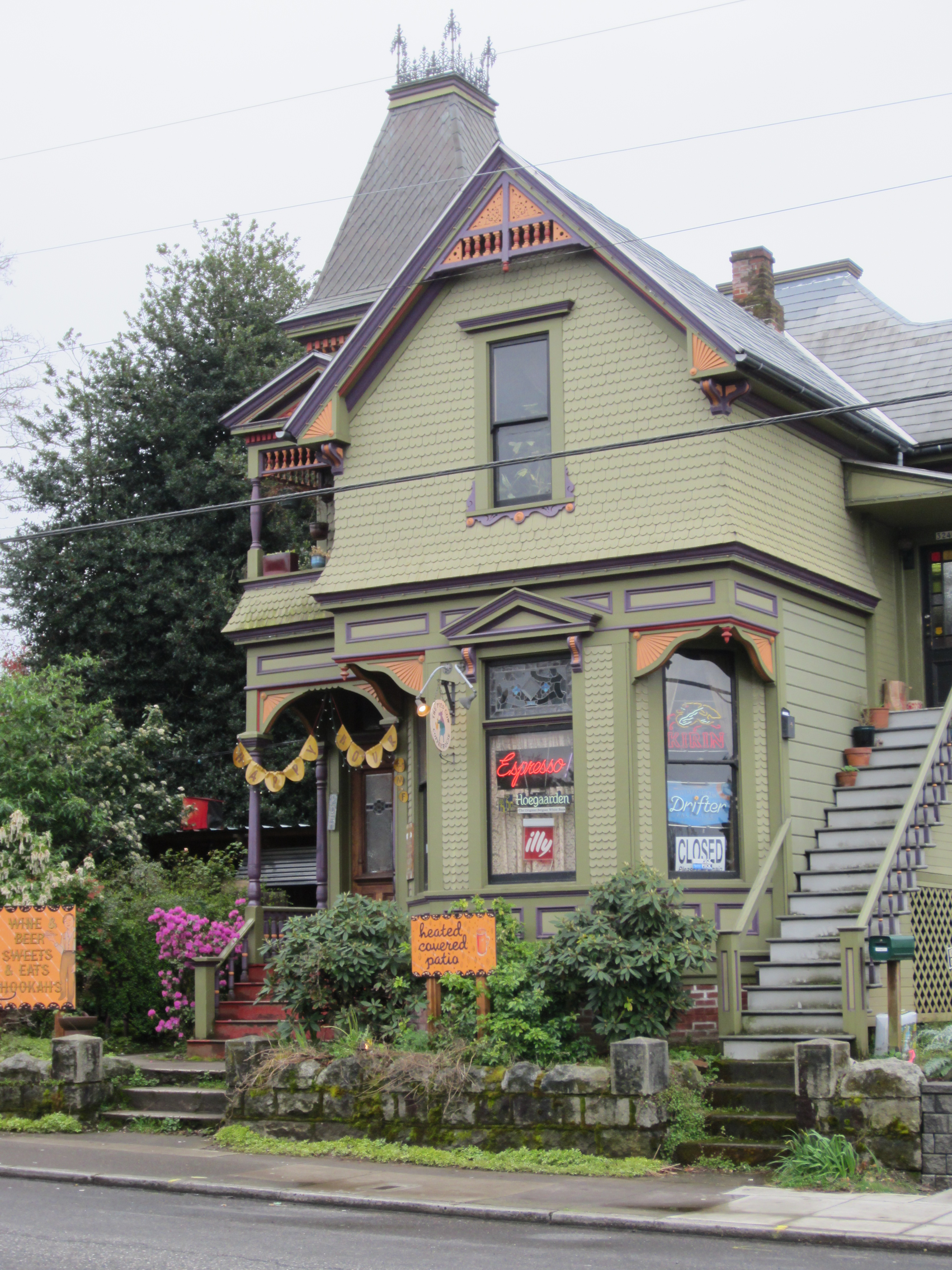
- The restaurant's exterior in 2012
- Interactive map of Pied Cow Coffeehouse

Restaurant information
- Closed: September 2023
- Owner: Jimmy Chen
- Location: 3244 SE Belmont Street, Portland, Multnomah, Oregon, 97214, United States
- Coordinates: 45.51636°N 122.63138°W

The Pied Cow Coffeehouse, or simply the Pied Cow, was a coffeehouse and hookah lounge in Portland, Oregon's Sunnyside neighborhood, in the United States. The restaurant had an "eclectic" interior decor and, in addition to coffee drinks and hookah, served fondue, desserts, mezze platters, and wine. It was known for being reportedly haunted by a woman named Lydia and had received generally positive reviews.

The Pied Cow appeared in Robyn Miller's 2013 film The Immortal Augustus Gladstone, which also featured a cameo appearance by restaurant owner Jimmy Chen, and on the artwork for Kyle Craft's 2018 album Full Circle Nightmare. The restaurant closed in 2023, and the Victorian house was listed for sale.

== Description ==
The Pied Cow was a coffeehouse and hookah lounge along Belmont Street, housed in a reportedly haunted Victorian house in southeast Portland's Sunnyside neighborhood. The menu included coffee-based drinks, cheese fondue, mezze platters, hummus, desserts, beer, wine, tea, and hookah. Menus displayed quotes by Friedrich Nietzsche. The interior was "eclectically decorated" and had a "cluttered altar dedicated to everyone from Nick Cave to Buddha". Dylan Jefferies and Delaney White of the Daily Vanguard called the Pied Cow "whimsical", writing that "numerous Victorian paintings and eclectic items adorn the walls, and a staircase is built up like a kind of altar, with various flowers, silks and dolls ornamenting every step".

According to Thrillist, the restaurant's patio was covered during winter months and the lawn was used during the summer months. The exterior had tall hedges and trees, as well as benches, plastic chairs, and "mismatched" lawn furniture. The large white tent used for outdoor dining was illuminated by heat lamps and Christmas lights. In 2014, a writer for The Columbian said the Pied Cow had a "varied clientele". In 2012, Willamette Week's John Locanthi said the establishment did not serve people under the age of 21. In contrast, in 2019 the paper said, "Anyone who grew up in Portland, especially in Southeast, knows the Pied Cow as a place to go to before turning 21."

== History ==
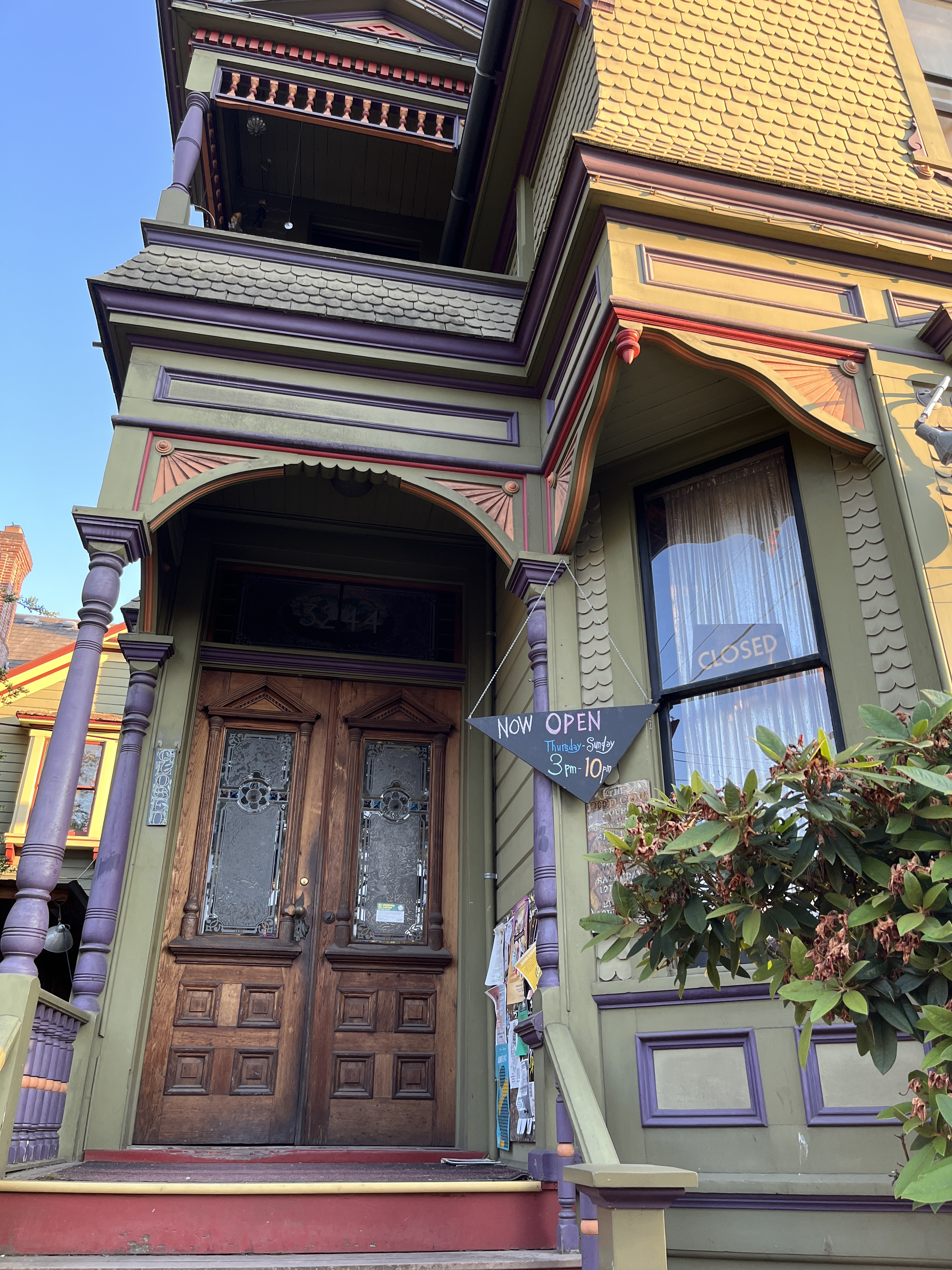
Entrance to the Victorian house, 2022

Before the Pied Cow, the house was occupied by a "lively" restaurant called Buttertoes. The restaurant was opened by three sisters in 1979 and continued operating into the early 1990s. The walls had murals of fairies and mermaids. In 1996, Jennifer "Jenny" Joyce painted Keep on the Sunnyside, a ten-panel mural celebrating the "history and character" of the neighborhood, along SE 30th Avenue at Belmont. One of the panels depicts the house and the Thaddeus Fisher House. Faded over time by multiple cleanings and neglect, the mural was repainted by the Portland Street Art Alliance, which supports muralists and other street artists, with Joyce's permission in 2018.

Robyn Miller's 2013 mockumentary film The Immortal Augustus Gladstone about a "150-year-old epileptic vampire with gay tendencies" was set in Portland and filmed in part at the Pied Cow. The restaurant's owner, Jimmy Chen, made a cameo appearance. Described as "strangely poetic" by The Washington Post, the film won Best Picture at the Oregon Independent Film Festival. The photograph used as artwork for Kyle Craft's 2018 album Full Circle Nightmare was taken at the Pied Cow. Additionally, the restaurant served as a set for the music video to Craft's song "Heartbreak Junky".

In September 2023, the business announced plans to close. The house was listed for $1.5 million, and interior decorations were put up for sale. Chen attributed the closure to the COVID-19 pandemic. The house sold in January 2024 and the restaurant Foxtrot opened in the space in late 2024.

=== Reported haunting ===
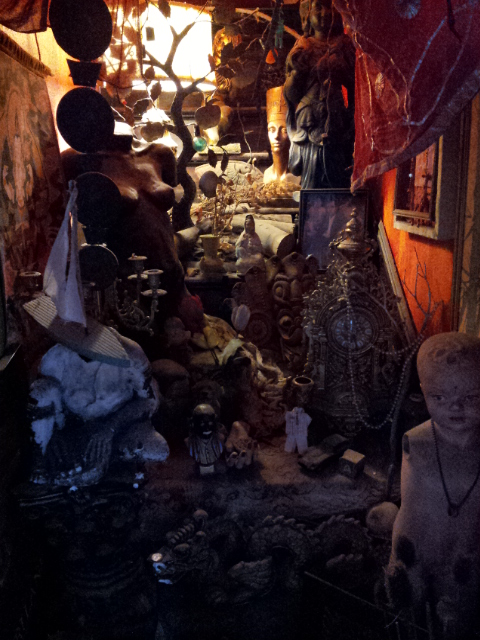
Interior altar, 2013

The building, which has housed Buttertoes and the Pied Cow, is reportedly haunted by a "kind and gentle" woman named Lydia, who "made items fall off shelves in the kitchen on a regular basis". In 2017, The Oregonian's Grant Butler said the house "looks like the perfect setting for a ghost story" and wrote, "What gained [Buttertoes] notoriety was its reputation for being haunted by a ghost named Aunt Lydia." Jefferies and White described the apparition in more detail:

The Ghost of Aunt Lydia, as she is known, is reportedly a friendly and gracious ghost. She is known to be seen with her hair pinned up, wearing black boots and a high-collared dress... Aunt Lydia would often rearrange table settings and move things in the kitchen.

The owners of Buttertoes hired a psychic who determined there was "a spirit was present in the home". A waitress reportedly resigned from the restaurant "after feeling so uncomfortable while closing by herself", according to Jefferies and White. In 2009, a server who had worked for Pied Cow for three years described a sink where she had felt "creeped out", saying, "I've semi-frequently had the feeling of seeing someone come down the stairs and go into the office." In 2013, employee Zachary Schauer recalled seeing Lydia after a long shift and said, "I just didn't give a shit and went upstairs. Several different people have seen her, and nothing really crazy has happened. It's a pretty typical young Catholic girl in a white dress kind of deal."

In a 2009 overview of Portland's reportedly haunted sites, Chen "declined to comment on the restaurant's alleged haunting. But in the kitchen, the wait staff buzzes with talk of the creepy basement." Jefferies and White said the Pied Cow "certainly plays up the haunted vibe" and wrote in 2019, "Many believe that the Ghost of Aunt Lydia still haunts the quirky Victorian house, and patrons of the Pied Cow still keep an eye out for her while sipping mint tea and smoking ornate hookahs."

== Reception ==
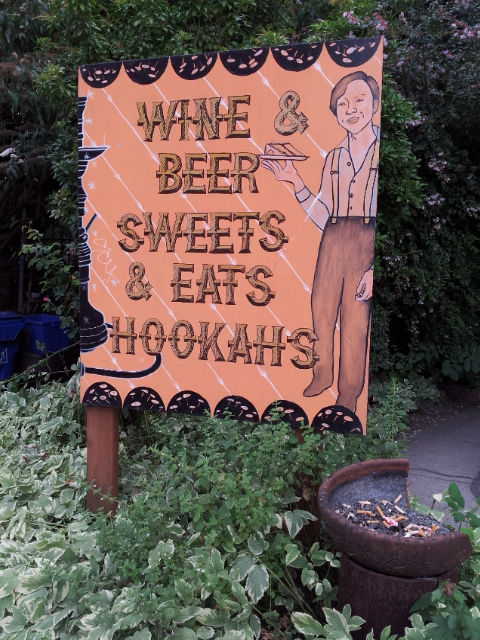
Exterior sign, 2013

In 2009, the Portland Mercury described the Pied Cow as a "pie shop/hookah bar/dispensary of all-around-delicious eats". Portland Monthly has said, "If you're looking for an unusual coffee house experience, this place is it. Walking into the Pied Cow is like stepping into your great-grandmother's parlor, complete with 19th century furniture and an array of wall art. Adding to the quirk, there's hookah on the patio and solid marionberry pie." In his 2012 book, Peaceful Places Portland, Paul Gerald wrote:

The lingering image after having a cup or plate at the Pied Cow could, depending on the season, be of an opium den, a Casbah, or a picnic on some hippie's farm. Inside, the room seems always dark, as if to be a retreat from light itself. Servers come and go from a tiny kitchen, and the looming space of the big old Victorian house adds a sense of mystery; not only does it feel somehow hidden from Belmont Street, but one is also left to wonder what's upstairs... At the Pied Cow it always seems like nighttime, but it's far from gloomy.

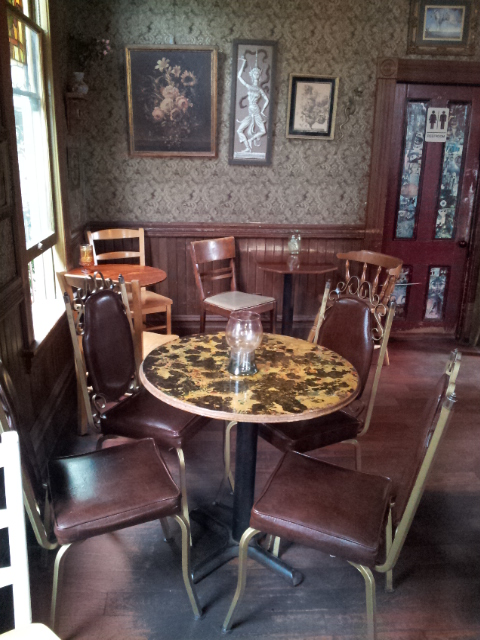
Interior seating, 2013

In his 2012 guide to local hookah establishments, John Locanthi of Willamette Week said the Pied Cow was dog-friendly and had "a more limited selection of flavors, mostly offering single fruit flavors". Furthermore, he opined, "The tranquil courtyard is the perfect spot to take a date. Mellow music, elegant wooden benches and delicious snacks are the perfect accompaniments to a warm summer evening." Jennifer Gilroy recommended the Pied Cow for hookah in her 2015 overview of smoking options in Portland. In her article on the "best secret nooks and hidey-holes in Portland cafes", the newspaper's Shannon Gormley called the restaurant "a goth's approximation of an Old World cafe" and wrote in 2017, "Since the Pied Cow doubles as a late-night hookah bar, it's rarely crowded during regular coffee-shop hours, which makes the tiny tables pushed up against large windows perfect loner havens... [T]he tent houses a few tables, but during off hours, you're most likely to have it all to yourself." In 2018, Lauren Yoshiko recommend the pecan pie "on the back patio (hookah optional), where there is often a very friendly neighborhood cat awaiting your attention".

A writer for The Columbian found the wait staff friendly and opined in 2014, "On a warm summer evening, the ample outdoor seating of Pied Cow under light-strung trees is just chill." Thrillist called the Pied Cow "a Portland classic" and said the exterior landscaping will make you "feel like you're dining in your own private garden". Zagat gave the Pied Cow ratings of 4.6 for food, 4.5 for decor, and 4.0 for service, each on a scale of 5. The guide said, "Beautiful meets bohemian at this Sunnyside coffeehouse set in a grand Victorian, where regulars fall in love with the exquisite desserts and other sweet and savory nosh plates; the romantic patio doubles as a hookah garden, and while it can get crowded, it's still a date-worthy choice, especially on summer nights."

== See also ==
- Impact of the COVID-19 pandemic on the restaurant industry in the United States
- List of reportedly haunted locations in the United States
