= Ain't Got No Home =

"Ain't Got No Home" may refer to:

- "Ain't Got No Home" (Clarence "Frogman" Henry song)
- "Ain't Got No Home" (Woody Guthrie song)
