= Spiel (disambiguation) =

Spiel is an annual board game trade fair held in Germany. It may also refer to:

- Spiel (Stockhausen), a 1952 musical composition by Karlheinz Stockhausen
- Spiel (album), a 2024 album by Office Dog
- SPIEL (journal), a culture/media journal
- Spiel or schpiel, a Yiddish word for a lengthy speech
