= Our First 100 Days =

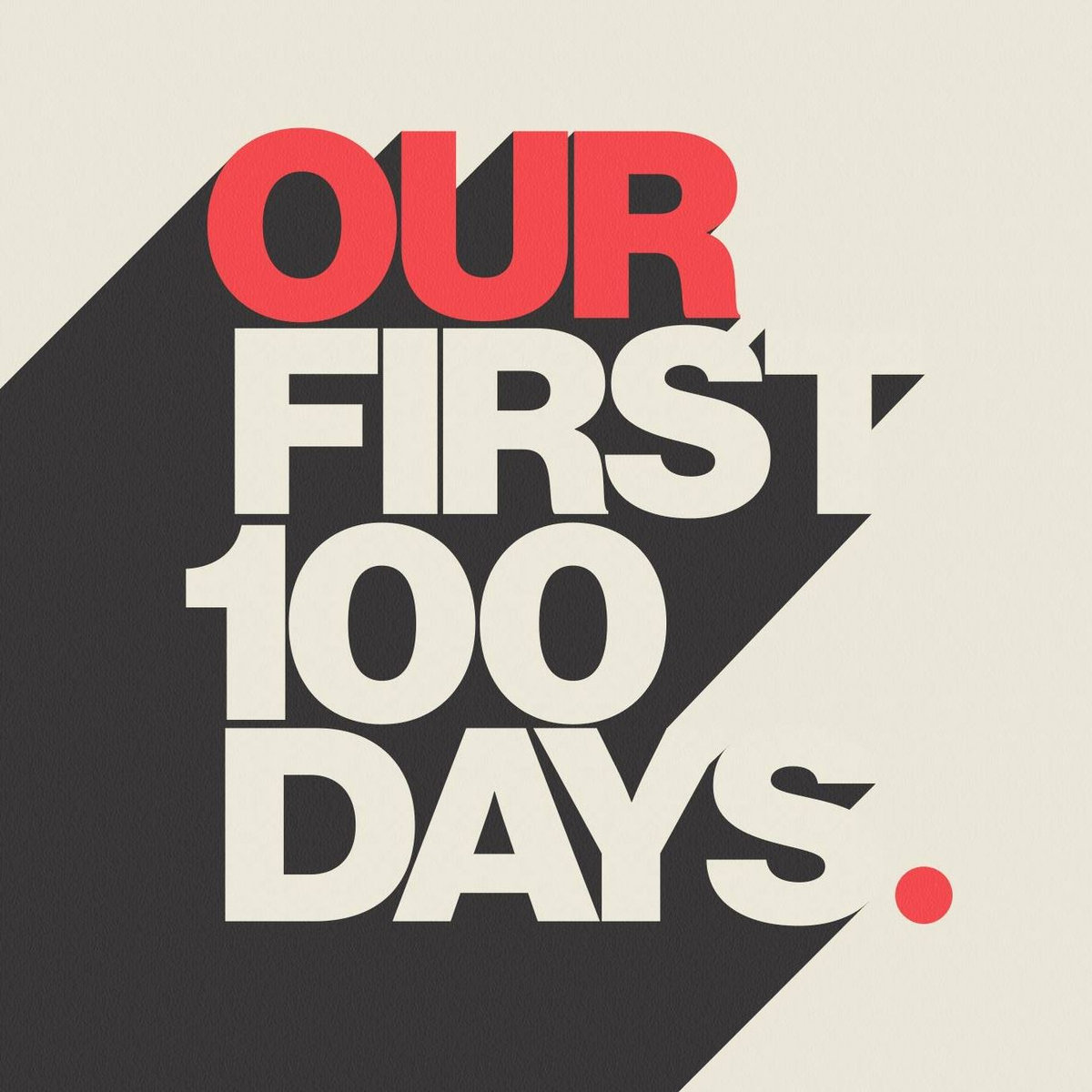

Compilation album by Various Artists
- Released: 20 January – 29 April 2017
- Length: 180:40
- Label: Secretly Group

Our First 100 Days is a compilation album that was released track-by-track from 20 January to 29 April 2017. The album was sold as a subscription for a one-time payment of $30, and one song per day was released during the first 100 days of Donald Trump's first presidency of the United States. Proceeds from the album's sale were donated to causes "threatened by Trump's proposed policies," including Southerners on New Ground and the People's Climate Movement.

The majority of the artists featured on Our First 100 Days are from the United States, but it also includes artists from Canada (Women, Suuns, Nap Eyes), the United Kingdom (Bill Fay, Gold Panda, Kate Tempest), New Zealand (Kane Strang), Sweden (Jens Lekman), Ireland (Glen Hansard), and Australia (Jen Cloher).

Our First 100 Days was released collaboratively by Secretly Group and 30 Days, 30 Songs. Music magazines Under the Radar and Consequence of Sound covered the release of every track, while others covered only a selection.

== Track listing ==
The first track on Our First 100 Days is "Fly On Your Wall" by Angel Olsen, which was released on 20 January 2017, the day of Donald Trump's inauguration. Subsequently, one new track was released per day until the final track, a cover of "This Land Is Your Land" by Phosphorescent, came out on 29 April 2017.

The track "Vacation" by PWR BTTM was later removed from the track listing, leaving the compilation with 99 tracks. It was initially reported that Whitney would also feature on the compilation, but they did not.

No.	Title	Artist	Length
1.	"Fly On Your Wall"	Angel Olsen	3:38
2.	"Vacation"	PWR BTTM	2:06
3.	"Visit the Dojo" (Slasher Flicks demo)	Avey Tare	3:21
4.	"Royko"	Jason Molina	3:27
5.	"Group Transport Hall" (alternate version)	Women	3:55
6.	"Native Tongue"	Suuns	4:22
7.	"Requiem for 2016"	Tilman Robinson & Luke Howard	4:38
8.	"Dogs At Night"	Meat Wave	3:42
9.	"Come To Me"	S. Carey	8:10
10.	"Not Gonna Say Your Name" (a cappella mix)	Entrance	3:56
11.	"Vampire E.R."	Joan of Arc	4:26
12.	"Feeling Yourself Disintegrate" (The Flaming Lips cover)	Peter Silberman	4:55
13.	"Omaha"	Toro Y Moi	3:16
14.	"Shame"	Bill Fay	3:33
15.	"Levantar Las Piernas" (2012 demo)	Helado Negro	4:32
16.	"Sweet Hereafter"	Bowerbirds	3:44
17.	"Comedy"	Califone	4:26
18.	"The Great & Undecided" (alternate version)	Ryley Walker	3:24
19.	"Everybody Knows"	Hurray for the Riff Raff	3:20
20.	"The World Won't Stop" (demo)	Jessica Lea Mayfield	4:13
21.	"Trump Talkin' Nukes"	Tim Heidecker	2:38
22.	"Dreamers In America"	Adam Torres	3:46
23.	"Sharpness"	Cross Record	5:47
24.	"Ballad of El Goodo"	Tara Jane O'Neil	4:44
25.	"Retune (Redone)"	The Range	3:56
26.	"I Am A Miserable Pig"	DRINKS	4:23
27.	"Everyone's The Same"	A Place To Bury Strangers	3:27
28.	"Bacon Frying"	Surfer Blood	3:13
29.	"Sky Colorer"	Mind Over Mirrors	4:33
30.	"Fringes Of Focus"	Dntel (feat. Benoit Pioulard)	4:30
31.	"All Our Deeds (Sure Find Their Ways)"	Will Johnson	7:32
32.	"In My Way"	Speedy Ortiz	3:36
33.	"I Feel So Lost"	Bop English	4:30
34.	"Halyards" (Pedro Vian remix)	Gold Panda	5:30
35.	"Dress" (PJ Harvey cover)	Buke and Gase	3:09
36.	"Picture"	Aero Flynn	4:26
37.	"Red Dress"	Lavender Country	3:57
38.	"These Dark Days"	Trevor Sensor	3:21
39.	"Correspondence"	Sam Amidon (feat. Inga)	1:36
40.	"The King of All Birds" (acoustic)	Aoife O'Donovan	3:26
41.	"Trained So Bad"	Holy Sons	3:20
42.	"Love Feels"	Airbird	4:52
43.	"Hear Me Now"	Loamlands	5:31
44.	"Just Marking Time At This Point"	Rob Crow	2:42
45.	"Power To The People" (demo)	Durand Jones & The Indications	4:24
46.	"War / Golden God" (demo)	Self Esteem (Kim Gordon and Mikal Cronin)	3:36
47.	"Calm Winds"	Sui Zhen	5:14
48.	"Bad Place For A Good Time" (radio edit)	Kate Tempest	3:18
49.	"Strange"	Richard Edwards	3:47
50.	"Triangles"	Thor & Friends	3:15
51.	"Bloom Sketch"	Eluvium	5:53
52.	"Burn Your Money"	Dave Harrington	4:54
53.	"D"	Here We Go Magic	3:56
54.	"Stand With You (Song for Ghostship)"	EMA	3:59
55.	"Hot Cheetos and Wine"	Cherry Glazerr	2:33
56.	"Spell"	Nothing	3:06
57.	"Grassland"	Itasca	3:58
58.	"the i in silence"	Nathan Bowles	3:44
59.	"Potential"	Flock of Dimes	4:44
60.	"Begin Again"	Wild Nothing	3:55
61.	"Hypochondria"	Kane Strang	2:56
62.	"Good News" (piano version)	Julien Baker	4:06
63.	"Back Door"	Twin Peaks with Juan Wauters	3:20
64.	"Rosemary"	Marissa Nadler	3:23
65.	"Love Hurts"	Mountain Man	3:04
66.	"Corridor Country"	James Elkington	3:05
67.	"I Wish I Knew How It Would Feel to Be Free"	Courtney Marie Andrews & Bonnie 'Prince' Billy	3:42
68.	"Face"	Mas Ysa	4:44
69.	"Your Laugh"	Jens Lekman	4:21
70.	"Your Samples, Our Obsession"	Nap Eyes	4:10
71.	"Etruscans"	The Mountain Goats	3:44
72.	"Dinosaur"	Minus The Bear	5:13
73.	"I Know YOU know You're Evil"	Strand of Oaks	6:12
74.	"Sweeney Ashtray"	Protomartyr	2:23
75.	"Vacuum Life"	Made of Oak	5:04
76.	"Dark Days Ahead"	Iron Reagan	1:24
77.	"Bergen-Belsen, Nov 8th 2016"	Into It. Over It.	3:32
78.	"Fireproof" (One Direction cover)	Mitski	1:49
79.	"Kool Aid"	Sean Watkins	5:28
80.	"Moonlight, or Flashlight"	Told Slant and The JCW	3:56
81.	"Foreign Lander"	Joan Shelley & Nathan Salsburg	2:24
82.	"Kinda Biblical"	Jen Cloher	3:51
83.	"I Pay My Taxes"	Jacky Winter feat. Amanda Roff	3:47
84.	"There Is A War" (Leonard Cohen cover)	Briana Marela	3:11
85.	"Visiting Hours" (alternate version)	Clap Your Hands Say Yeah	3:59
86.	"Vigilante Man"	Glen Hansard	3:25
87.	"Wade In"	Julianna Barwick	3:49
88.	"Right"	Bully	2:24
89.	"Stroll"	Terry Allen	3:30
90.	"Denomination Blues"	Okkervil River	6:23
91.	"Shrunken Heads"	Steve Gunn	5:14
92.	"Surgeonman"	Jonathan Rado	5:15
93.	"U Ruined It"	Gilligan Moss	5:07
94.	"Strong Enuff"	How To Dress Well	3:43
95.	"Silver Tongue"	Beach Fossils	2:57
96.	"Bag Of Rats"	Kevin Morby	3:59
97.	"The Devil In His Youth" (Protomartyr cover)	David Bazan	2:50
98.	"Turn The Other Cheek"	Jay Som	2:59
99.	"Silver" (demo)	Waxahatchee	2:55
100.	"This Land Is Your Land" (Woody Guthrie cover)	Phosphorescent	3:40
Total length:			180:40

== See also ==
- Donald Trump in music
