= The Hills of Donegal =

The Hills of Donegal may refer to:

- The Hills of Donegal (film), a 1947 British film
- Las Vegas (In the Hills of Donegal), a song by Irish group Goats Don't Shave
