= The Rusty Razor =

Studio album by Goats Don't Shave
- Released: 1992
- Recorded: 1992
- Genre: Celtic rock; folk rock
- Length: 46:12
- Label: Cooking Vinyl
- Producer: Goats Don't Shave; Mudd Wallis

Goats Don't Shave chronology
The Rusty Razor (1992)	Out in the Open (1994)

The Rusty Razor is the debut studio album by Irish folk band Goats Don't Shave, released in 1992. The album became a success after release, going Gold in Ireland.

== History and reception ==
Goats Don't Shave began performing their Celtic folk-rock in between their day jobs shortly before the release of The Rusty Razor.

Critics hailed the album "a classic".

== Track listing ==
All songs written by Pat Gallagher.

1. "Let The World Keep on Turning"
2. "Las Vegas (In the Hills of Donegal)"
3. "Eyes"
4. "John Cherokee"
5. "The Evictions"
6. "Biddy from Sligo/Connaught Man's Rambles"
7. "The Ranger"
8. "Mary Mary"
9. "Closing Time"
10. "What She Means To Me"
11. "Crooked Jack"
12. "When You're Dead (You're Great)"

== Personnel ==
- Pat Gallagher – vocals, banjo, guitar
- Jason Phibin – fiddle
- Charlie Logue – keyboard
- Declan Quinn – tinwhistle, mandolin
- Gerry Coyle – bass guitar
- Sean Doherty – acoustic guitar
- Michael Gallagher – drums
