= Dolls of Highland =

Studio album by Kyle Craft
- Released: April 29, 2016
- Length: 44:30
- Label: Sub Pop
- Producer: Kyle Craft

Kyle Craft chronology
Dolls of Highland (2016)	Full Circle Nightmare (2018)

Dolls of Highland is the debut studio album by American singer-songwriter and musician Kyle Craft. It was released on April 29, 2016 through Sub Pop record label.

== Promotion ==
On March 29, 2016, Craft announced a late spring U.S. tour to promote Dolls of Highland during its release, all while supporting American indie rock band the Fruit Bats.

== Critical reception ==
Professional ratings
Aggregate scores
Source	Rating
Metacritic	79/100
Review scores
Source	Rating
AllMusic	3.5/5 stars
The Guardian	4/5 stars
Paste	8/10
Pitchfork	8.1/10
PopMatters	8/10
Record Collector	4/5 stars
The Skinny	2/5 stars

Dolls of Highland received positive reviews from music critics. At Metacritic, which assigns a normalized rating out of 100 to reviews from critics, the album received an average score of 79, which indicates "generally positive reviews", based on 7 reviews. AllMusic critic Mark Donelson gave the album a positive review, stating: "Taken together, Craft delivers a fun and loose breakup album replete with colorful characters, memorable tunes, and an even more memorable vocal delivery--a noteworthy debut." The Guardian's Dave Simpson described the record as a "brilliant, rollicking debut," which "hurls together Craft's Dylan-meets-Brett Anderson holler with rollicking ragtime stomp, reminiscent of vintage Cockney Rebel or early Suede." Tiffany Daniels of Paste described Craft as "an unlikely hero of rock music", stating that he's "created a noteworthy, potentially groundbreaking debut album in Dolls of Highland."

Stuart Berman of Pitchfork praised the album, stating: "Craft's outsized personality is matched by less flashy, more fundamental skills: vivid, immersive storytelling and sharply focused, fat-free songs that have the lived-in feel of 40-year-old FM-radio favorites." PopMatters' Chris Ingalis described the record as "the sound of a young man returning home to chronicle his small town roots with the use of his ample talents" and "an exhilarating ride from start to finish." David Harvey of Record Collector magazine compared the album to the works of Bowie, Dylan and Don't Shoot Me I'm Only the Piano Player-era Elton John, writing: "There are touches of My Morning Jacket in the vocals too, but in chief it is the already-mentioned artists who dominate Dolls Of Highland and if you've been missing them a lot, then this is an album not to be missed, filled with yearning and melody." Uncut magazine described the album as "a head-turning mix, a sort of pop-art take on Southern gothic, and highly infectious."

Nevertheless, Duncan Harman of The Skinny gave the album a mixed review, stating: "Craft's nutcracker vocals and lyrical self-exposure never quite as endearing as they threaten to be."

== Track listing ==
All songs are written by Kyle Craft.

1. "Eye of a Hurricane" — 4:31
2. "Balmorhea" — 3:01
3. "Berlin" — 4:17
4. "Lady of the Ark" — 5:06
5. "Gloom Girl" — 4:49
6. "Trinidad Beach (Before I Ride)" — 2:10
7. "Future Midcity Massacre" — 3:07
8. "Black Mary" — 3:36
9. "Pentecost" — 4:01
10. "Dolls of Highland" — 1:27
11. "Jane Beat the Reaper" — 4:23
12. "Three Candles" — 4:02

== Personnel ==
Album personnel as adapted from album liner notes:

- Kyle Craft – performer
- Opi Gridwald – trumpet (5)
- Jacob Disedare – drums (7); backing vocals (10)
- John Martin – backing vocals (10)
- Laura Thompson – backing vocals (10)
- Melissa Disedare – backing vocals (10)
- Stevey Hensley – upright bass (12)
- Benjamin Weikel (The Helio Sequence) – mixing
- Brandon Summers (The Helio Sequence) – mixing
- Greg Calbi – mastering
- Andrew Toups – photography
- Sasha Barr – art direction
