= Bhiman (album) =

Studio album by Bhi Bhiman
- Released: January 24, 2012
- Recorded: Tiny Telephone, San Francisco
- Genre: Folk rock
- Label: Boocoo Music
- Producer: Sam Kassirer

Bhi Bhiman chronology
Cookbook (2008)	Bhiman (2012)	Rhythm and Reason (2015)

Bhiman is the second album by American singer-songwriter Bhi Bhiman, released on January 24, 2012 on Boocoo Music. The lead single was "Guttersnipe," with a music video released in 2011. Bhiman peaked at No. 28 on the Top Heatseekers chart during the second week of February in 2012. It also peaked at No. 15 that same week on the Billboard Folk Albums chart.

== Production and videos ==
In 2011, he began work on what would be his first nationally distributed album. The bulk of the record was tracked at Tiny Telephone Studios in San Francisco. Following those sessions, Bhiman finished the album with producer Sam Kassirer (Lake Street Dive, Josh Ritter) at the Great North Sound Society in Parsonsfield, Maine.

The music video for the single "Guttersnipe" depicts life in India along the railways. Bhiman himself said that "What I love about this video is the great beauty in the midst of ragged poverty." The video debuted on December 5, 2011.

== Release and reception ==
Professional ratings
Review scores
Source	Rating
Chicago Sun-Times	4/5 stars
Drowned in Sound	8/10 stars
Paste	(positive)
Robert Christgau	A–
The Washington Post	(positive)

The album, entitled Bhiman, was released in 2012 and earned rave reviews from publications like The New York Times, The Washington Post, and esteemed rock critic Robert Christgau of NPR's All Things Considered. Bhiman peaked at No. 28 on the Top Heatseekers chart during the second week of February in 2012. It also peaked at No. 15 that same week on the Billboard Folk Albums chart.

== Track listing ==
No.	Title	Length
1.	"Guttersnipe"	06:52
2.	"Time Heals"	05:28
3.	"Crime of Passion"	03:23
4.	"Take What I'm Given"	04:19
5.	"Mexican Wine"	01:09
6.	"Kimchee Line"	03:17
7.	"The Cookbook"	03:38
8.	"Atlatl"	02:44
9.	"Eye on You"	06:07
10.	"Ballerina"	04:14
11.	"Life's Been Better"	03:54

== Charts ==
Chart (2014)	Peak position
US Top Heatseekers (Billboard)	28
US Folk Albums (Billboard)	15
