= Fantastic Cat =

Indie rock musical group

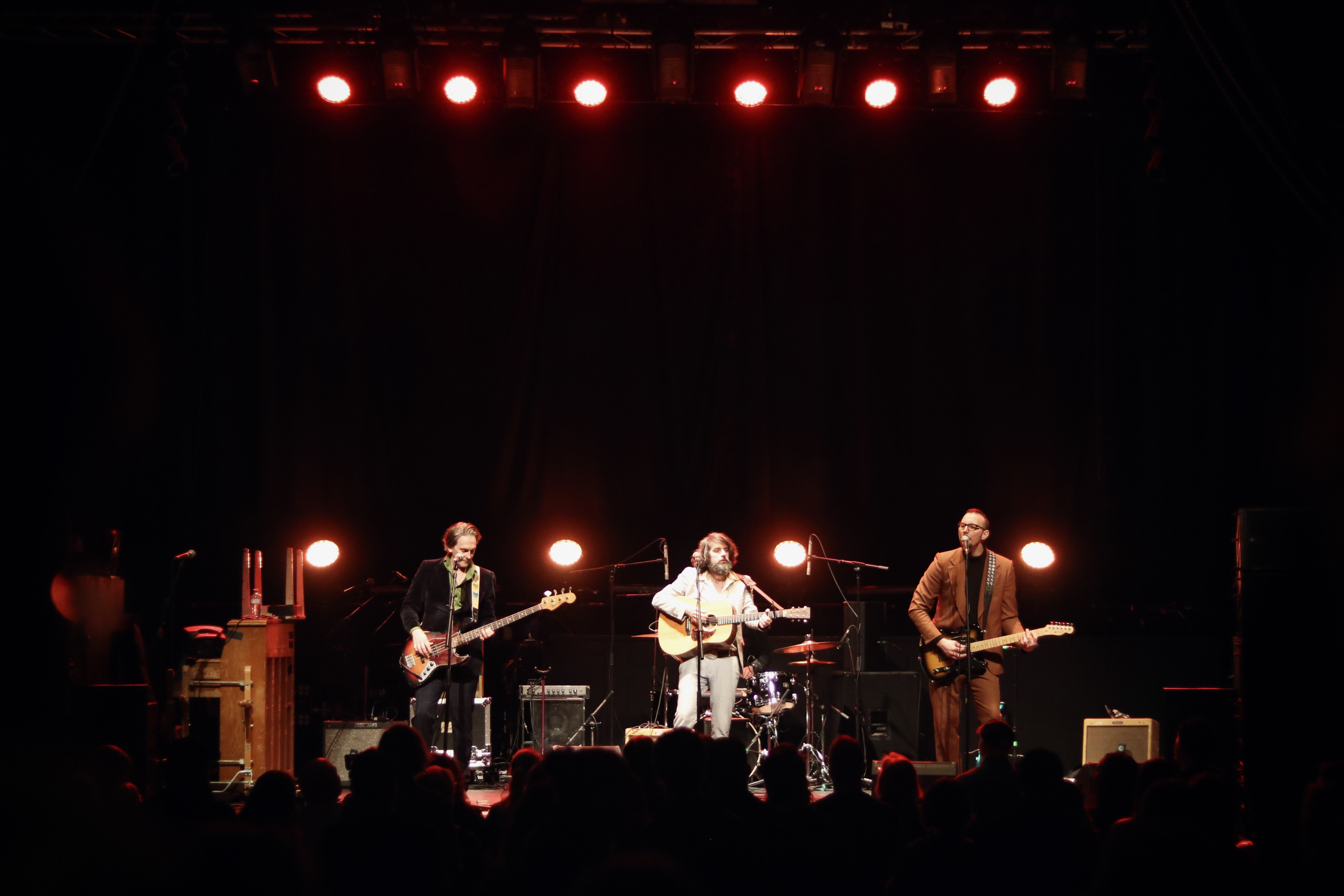
- Fantastic Cat performing in 2024

Background information
- Genres: Americana, Folk rock, Indie rock, Country music
- Years active: 2021–present
- Labels: Blue Rose Music, Missing Piece Records
- Members: Anthony D'Amato, Brian Dunne, Don DiLego, Mike Montali
- Website: https://www.fantasticcatband.com/

Fantastic Cat is an indie music group consisting of Anthony D'Amato, Brian Dunne, Don DiLego, and Mike Montali.

== History ==
Fantastic Cat was conceived as a collaborative project between singer-songwriters Don DiLego, Anthony D'Amato, and Brian Dunne along with Hollis Brown frontman Mike Montali. Lacking a name before their first recording session, the four asked a waitress at a local New York City bar what they should call themselves. Without hesitation, she replied, "Fantastic Cat," and the name stuck. Artist Jane Beaird illustrated the band as anthropomorphic cats for the cover of their self-titled 2021 EP, which eventually turned into the signature masks the band wears in all of their photos and videos. The band has described their humor and satirical attitude as a spoof of their own respective solo careers taking themselves too seriously.

Fantastic Cat released their debut LP The Very Best of Fantastic Cat in 2022. The cover art features the band members photographed in their masks by Shervin Lainez, and the accompanying bio references past bands with multiple singers and songwriters, claiming it had "never been done" before going on to list several famous examples including the Beatles, Crosby, Stills, Nash & Young, and the Highwaymen. Touring musician Michael Hesslein has supported the group performing piano in live shows.

Rolling Stone called the album a "wildly satisfying collection of folk-rock, country, Americana, and good old rock & roll" with "equal doses of Dylan and Springsteen," and the band made their national television debut shortly after the release on CBS Saturday Morning. Reviewer Jon Young favorably compared the album's opening track "C'mon Armageddon" to Bob Dylan's "Subterranean Homesick Blues" in No Depression, while Glide Magazine's Shawn Donohue likened the album to the music of Delta Spirit, Bruce Springsteen, Jackson Browne and Monsters of Folk. In an enthusiastic review for Americana Highways, critic John Moore stated, "If there is any justice in this world, this would be the first in a series of shows, followed by another record. Even the Traveling Wilburys gave us two albums (and the Highwaymen gave us three)."

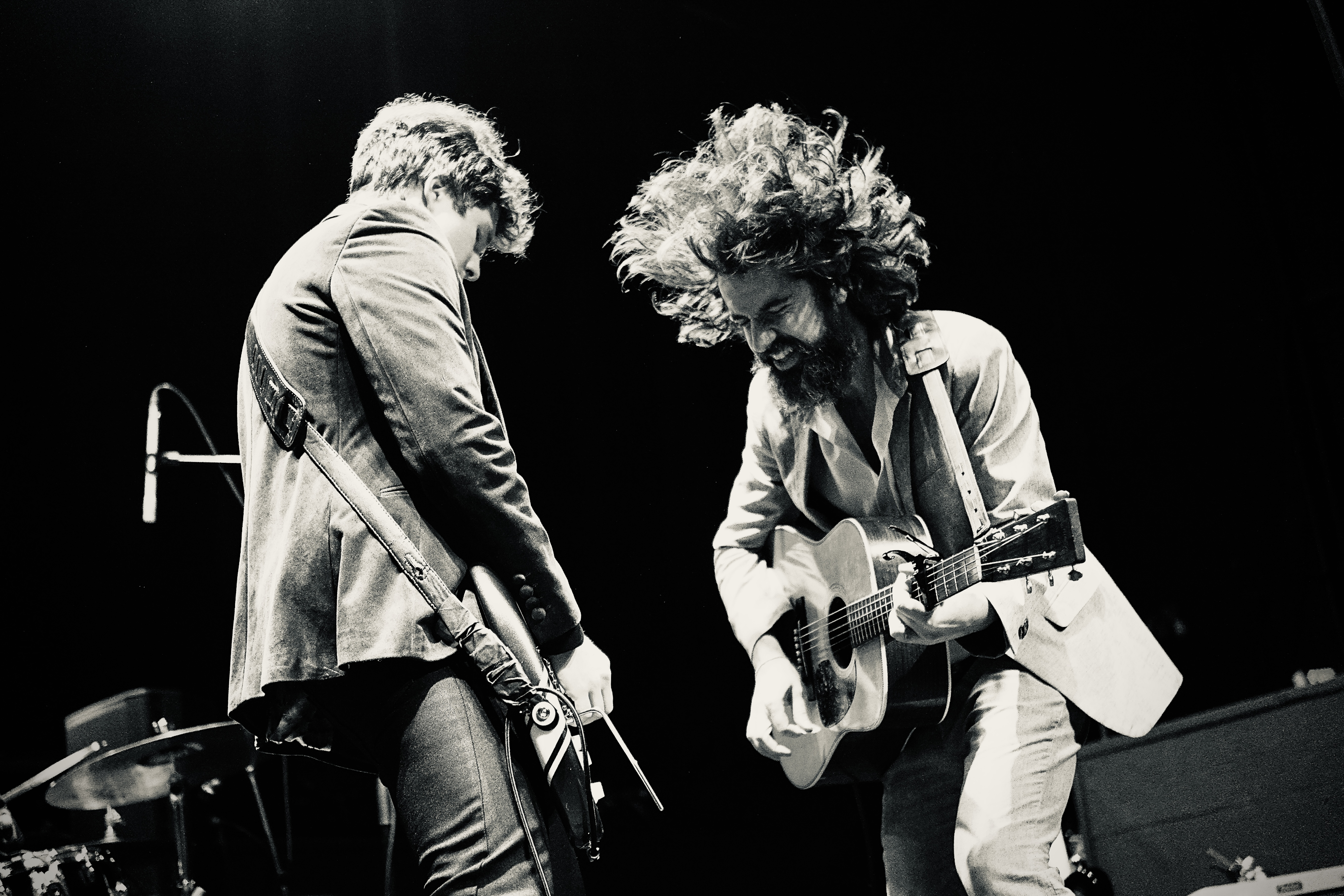
Band members Brian Dunne (left) and Anthony D'Amato (right) performing in 2024.

In 2023, Fantastic Cat released a cover of Warren Zevon's "Keep Me in Your Heart" and teamed up with Butch Walker for a 50th anniversary recording of Paul McCartney and Wings' "Band on the Run." The band also released a limited edition 7" vinyl EP titled Live at The Bowery Ballroom, which they claimed was a "Japanese import" from a factory that had been destroyed by Godzilla after the first and only pressing.

Fantastic Cat announced their second LP, Now That's What I Call Fantastic Cat, in 2024 with the release of a music video for lead single "All My Fault," which parodied vintage VHS dating services. The album track "So Glad You Made It" featured Adam Duritz of Counting Crows, and a music video for the song features Duritz along with Run DMC's Darryl McDaniels portraying the role of the band's engineer. The Boston Globe declared "So Glad You Made It" one of the Songs of the Summer, calling Now That's What I Call Fantastic Cat "an album without a dud," while No Depression raved that "there's not another rock band like them," and The Village Voice asked "Is Fantastic Cat the 'Wu-Tang Clan of Folk Rock?'" The band returned to perform on CBS Saturday Morning on June 8, 2024.

Fantastic Cat was announced as one of the guest performers on 2024's Silver Patron Saints: The Songs of Jesse Malin, a benefit album for the Sweet Relief artist fund on behalf of Jesse Malin, with Fantastic Cat covering "Queen of the Underworld" exclusive on the vinyl release. In October the band released two holiday themed covers, Lindsey Buckingham's "Holiday Road," and "Feliz Navidad" in collaboration with mariachi band Corazon de Mexico.

In 2026 the band announced their third studio album, Cat Out of Hell. The album's name is a parody of Meat Loaf's Bat Out of Hell. The album marked a departure from recording in DiLego's studio in the Poconos, with the band recording in a larger studio in Virginia in only ten days to help the studio album better emulate the sound of a live performance. Three singles, "Donnie Takes the Bus," "Don't Let Go" and "Elevator" were released ahead of the album, with "Donnie Takes the Bus" being the group's first song to chart, reaching #30 on the Billboard Adult Alternative Airplay chart. "Donnie Takes the Bus" would also chart on the Americana Music Association radio charts. Cat Out of Hell released on April 10, 2026. A review for Glide Magazine praised the album as "a well-produced collection that finds the band assuredly growing closer." A 9.4/10 review from Atwood Magazine wrote, "Now, on Cat Out of Hell, everything clicks. The looseness is still there, the camaraderie still intact, but it’s all channeled with a confidence and clarity earned through time, trust, and miles on the road together."

== Discography ==
Studio Albums

- The Very Best Of Fantastic Cat (2022)
- Now That's What I Call Fantastic Cat (2024)
- Cat Out of Hell (2026)

EPs

- Fantastic Cat EP (2021)
- Live at The Bowery Ballroom (2023)

Singles

Year	Song	Peak chart positions		Album
Year	Song	US AAA	US AMA	Album
2026	"Donnie Takes the Bus"	30	14	Cat Out of Hell
