= Spiel (album) =

Studio album by Office Dog
- Released: 26 January 2024
- Genre: Indie rock
- Length: 40:21
- Label: Flying Nun; New West
- Producer: De Stevens

Spiel is the debut studio album by New Zealand indie rock band Office Dog, released on 26 January 2024 through Flying Nun and New West Records. It received acclaim from critics.

== Writing and recording ==
Office Dog frontman Kane Strang wrote most of the album on drives from Dunedin to Auckland as he was in the process of moving and going through "personal turmoil". After gathering together a band also consisting of bassist Rassani Tolovaa and drummer Mitchell Innes, the album was recorded in just two days.

== Critical reception ==
Professional ratings
Aggregate scores
Source	Rating
Metacritic	80/100
Review scores
Source	Rating
AllMusic	3.5/5 stars
Mojo	3/5 stars
Uncut	3/5 stars

Spiel received a score of 80 out of 100 on review aggregator Metacritic based on four critics' reviews, indicating "generally favorable" reception. Uncut stated that "the threesome manage to toe the very fine line between control and chaos, suppression and release", while Mojo felt that "it may make for a rollercoaster musical ride, but it's utterly thrilling".

AllMusic's Marcy Donelson wrote that the band "sculpt [...] a sound that commits more fully to angsty, '90 lo-fi inspirations, with a weightier guitar palette and discontented lyrics to match", calling the album "darkly anxious yet engaging". John Moore of Glide Magazine summarised it as "a dozen sublime indie rock tracks contrasting lo-fi guitars with calm soothing vocals for a puzzlingly beautiful effect".

== Track listing ==
Spiel track listing
No.	Title	Length
1.	"Shade"	2:51
2.	"Antidote"	3:57
3.	"Gleam"	2:34
4.	"Warmer"	3:44
5.	"Big Air"	3:26
6.	"Tightropes"	3:02
7.	"In the Red"	3:39
8.	"Hand in Hand"	2:59
9.	"Cut the Ribbon"	3:56
10.	"Teeth"	2:20
11.	"The Crater"	2:31
12.	"Spiel"	5:22
Total length:		40:21
