= Goats Don't Shave =

Irish folk rock band

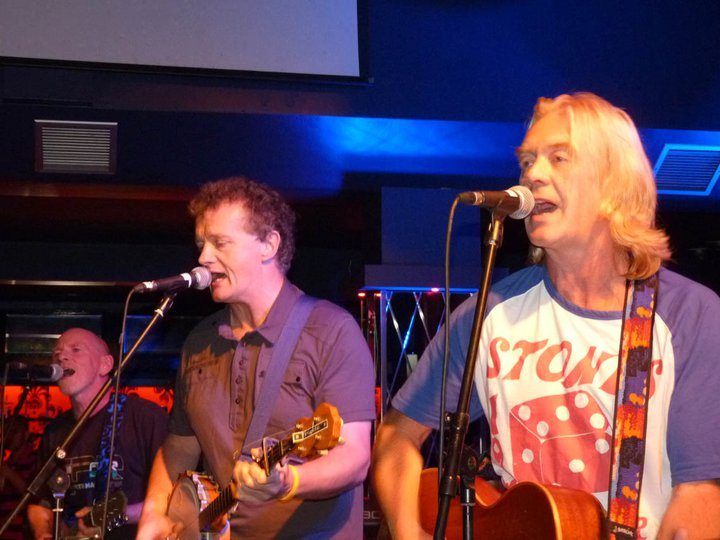
- Goats Don't Shave performing at Féile Earthcore on 17 July 2011 in Gweedore, County Donegal.

Background information
- Origin: County Donegal, Ireland
- Genres: Celtic rock, folk rock
- Years active: 1990–1998, 2003, 2011 - Present
- Labels: Cooking Vinyl
- Past members: Pat Gallagher; Charlie Logue; Declan Quinn; Gerry Coyle; Seán Doherty; Michael Gallagher; Jason Philbin
- Website: https://www.facebook.com/GoatsDontShave

Goats Don't Shave are an Irish folk rock band formed in 1990. Formed in Dungloe, County Donegal, the group was fronted by singer-songwriter Pat Gallagher and backed by musicians, Charlie Logue (keyboards), Declan Quinn (whistle), Gerry Coyle (bass), Seán Doherty (acoustic guitar), Jason Philbin (fiddle) and Michael Gallagher (drums).

The group released two albums together, The Rusty Razor (1992) and Out in the Open (1994). After a sabbatical which lasted from 1995 onwards, a third album Tór was released in 1998 containing material from both Pat Gallagher and Goats Don't Shave. They are probably most well known for their songs "Let the World Keep on Turning" and "Las Vegas (In the Hills of Donegal)", both taken from their debut album The Rusty Razor.

== History ==
Their name comes from a pub incident in which a tipsy local character Michael "Micky Beag" Gallagher was told to stop acting the goat and have a shave and clean himself up - his response was to walk away muttering the words "goats don't shave!!" Since their formation back in the summer of 1990, Goats Don't Shave have risen to become one of the most popular bands Ireland has produced.

They began performing their Celtic folk-rock in between their day jobs; which included a few fishermen, at which point the lads started to pick up regular gigs. Next, they recorded their first EP. There were five songs on it and began to sell them locally. The sales were so good that record companies started calling and so did RTÉ and The Late Late Show.

Led by singer/songwriter Pat Gallagher, the Goats became one of Ireland’s most outstanding bands in the early 1990s with top ten singles and a platinum-selling album. Formed around 1989, the Goats’ initial success came with their singles: "Las Vegas in the Hills of Donegal" and "Let the World Keep on Turning", both of which subsequently featured on their debut album, "The Rusty Razor". The Goats sold-out concert venues the length and breadth of Ireland, the UK, Europe and North America. They played both Glastonbury and Finsbury Park Fleadh whilst also being voted Best Band of 1993 by Time Out, one of London’s leading listings magazines.

By the time of the 1994 release of their second album "Out in the Open", the Goats’ heavy touring schedule had undoubtedly refined their performance. All the songs on both albums were composed by Pat Gallagher.

In 1992, the Goats released their first album through Cooking Vinyl, The Rusty Razor, which went gold in Ireland. In 1994, they released their second album, Out in the Open.

== Reunions and return to the road ==
The band reformed in 2003 to play at the popular Mary From Dungloe International Festival, the concert each year is usually held on the town's Main Street, however, due to over 2,000 people showing up to see the bands rare performance, it was moved to The Cope car park. Due to popular demand, the Goats decided to reform in 2012. They headed back to the studio to record a new album. The new album "Songs from Earth" was released in March 2014 and was followed by promotional tours in Ireland, Scotland and the UK. In August 2013, the Goats released one of their new songs: "The Little King", dedicated to the memory of the young Glasgow boxer, Benny Lynch, whose parents come from Donegal, Ireland. Following the release of "The Little King", the Goats were invited to play at Ballyshannon Folk Festival and Letterkenny Live. The Goats also played to a 40,000+ crowd at Celtic Park prior to one of Celtic’s football games in November 2013 and later that night at a sold-out gig at the Classic Grand Rock Venue in the city. The Goats’ most popular songs have been covered by dozens of other bands and a Goats Don’t Shave song is in practically every jukebox in watering holes around the world.

== Band members ==
- Pat Gallagher – vocals, banjo, guitar
- Jason Phibin – fiddle
- Charlie Logue – keyboard
- Declan Quinn – tinwhistle, mandolin
- Gerry Coyle – bass guitar
- Shaun Doherty – acoustic guitar
- Michael Gallagher – drums
- Kevin Breslin – keyboards
- John Foggy Boyle – ( bass)
- Stephen Campbell – fiddle

== Discography ==
- The Rusty Razor (1992)
- Out in the Open (1994)
- Tór (1998)
- Songs from Earth (2014)

== Compilations ==
- The Best of Celtic Inspiration (1998)

This album contains 18 tracks, with the Goats Don't Shave song, "Eyes", at track 17.
