= Old Man Trump =

Folk song by Woody Guthrie

Single by Ryan Harvey featuring Ani DiFranco and Tom Morello
- Written: 1954 (original lyrics); 2016 (adaptation and music)
- Released: June 21, 2016
- Genre: Folk
- Length: 3:05
- Label: Firebrand Records
- Composer: Ryan Harvey
- Lyricists: Woody Guthrie, Ryan Harvey

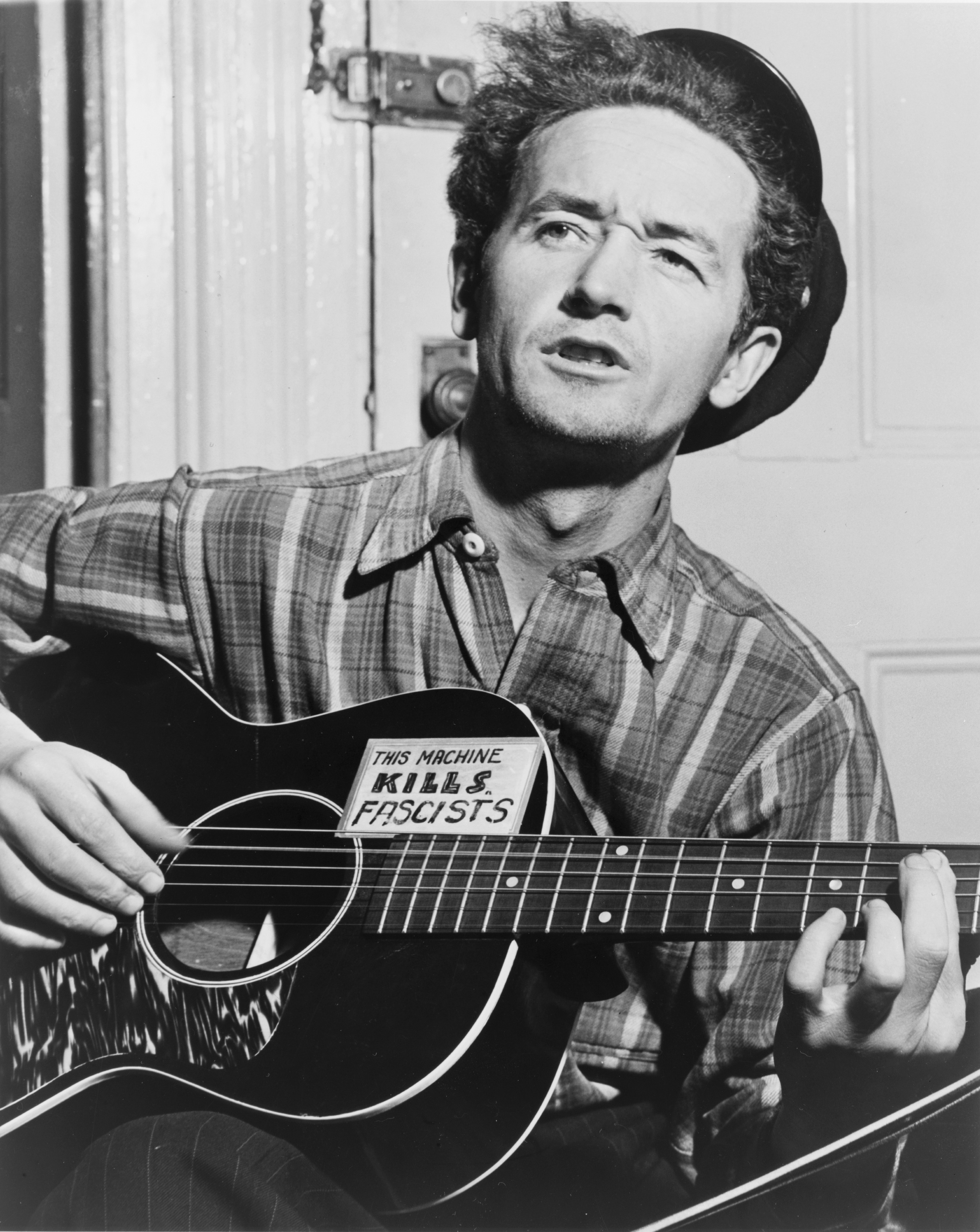
Woody Guthrie in 1943

"Old Man Trump" is a song with lyrics written by American folk singer-songwriter Woody Guthrie in 1954. The song describes the racist housing practices and discriminatory rental policies of his landlord, Fred Trump, father of the current United States President Donald Trump. In January 2016, Will Kaufman, a Guthrie scholar and professor of American literature and culture at the University of Lancashire, unearthed the handwritten lyrics while conducting research at the Woody Guthrie Archives in Tulsa, Oklahoma. There are no known Guthrie recordings of this song.

== Overview ==
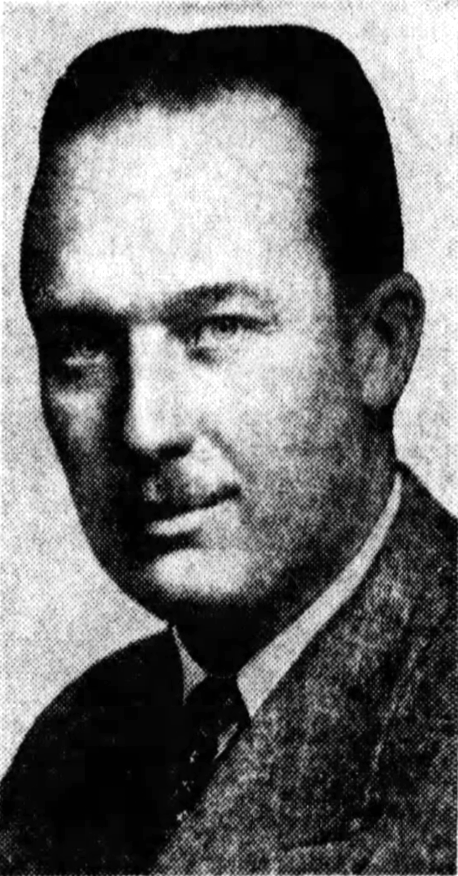
Fred Trump c. 1950

In December 1950, Woody Guthrie signed a lease at the Beach Haven apartment complex owned and operated by Fred Trump in Gravesend, Brooklyn. There are several handwritten drafts of the lyrics with titles such as "Beach Haven Race Hate" and "Beach Haven Ain't My Home". In its lyrics, Guthrie expresses his dissatisfaction with Trump and the "color line" he had drawn in his Brooklyn neighborhood:

I suppose
Old Man Trump knows
Just how much
Racial Hate
He stirred up
In the bloodpot of human hearts
When he drawed
That color line
Here at his Beach Haven family project

Similarly, an unreleased variant of Guthrie's "Ain't Got No Home" protests Trump's segregation at Beach Haven.

Beach Haven is Trump's Tower
Where no Black folks come to roam
No, no, Old Man Trump!
Old Beach Haven ain't my home!

According to scholar Will Kaufman, Guthrie "thought that Fred Trump was one who stirs up racial hate, and implicitly profits from it." In Guthrie's notebooks he wrote about wanting to put an end to the segregation with "a face of every bright color laffing and joshing in these old darkly weeperish empty shadowed windows."

I welcome you here to live. I welcome you and your man both here to Beach Haven to love in any ways you please and to have some kind of a decent place to get pregnant in and to have your kids raised up in. I'm yelling out my own welcome to you.

In the 1950s, the Federal Housing Administration, which funded some of Trump's housing projects, set guidelines for avoiding the integration of black people into white neighborhoods. In 1973, the U.S. Justice Department's Civil Rights Division sued the Trump Organization (Fred Trump, chair, and Donald Trump, president) for violating the Fair Housing Act.

== Legacy ==
In partnership with the Guthrie archives and the Guthrie family, Woody's words have been put to music by California rock band U.S. Elevator, fronted by Johnny Irion, who was married to Sarah Lee Guthrie, Woody's granddaughter. "Old Man Trump" has also been recorded by riot-folk singer Ryan Harvey with Ani DiFranco and guitarist Tom Morello, as well as by independent artist/musician Chip Godwin.

== See also ==
- Residential segregation in the United States
- Donald Trump in music - music about Fred Trump's son
