= Bhi Bhiman =

American singer-songwriter

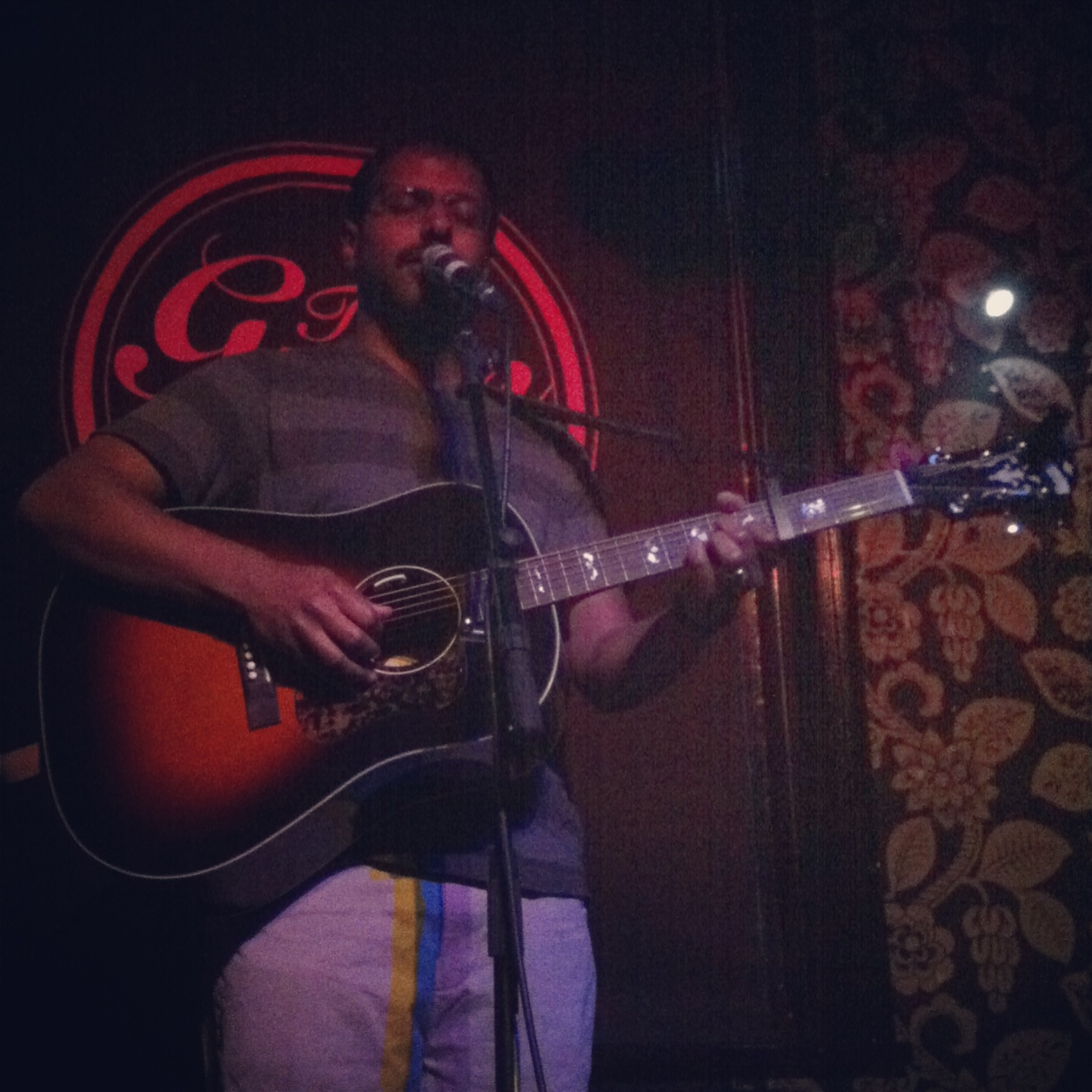
- Bhi Bhiman, 2013

Background information
- Born: Bhi Ramesvara Bhiman; St. Louis, Missouri, U.S.
- Origin: Santa Cruz, California, U.S.
- Genres: Folk rock; folk; rock; soul
- Occupations: Singer; songwriter
- Instruments: Vocals; guitar
- Years active: 2002–present
- Labels: Boocoo Music; Tummy Touch
- Formerly of: Hippie Grenade
- Website: BhiBhiman.com

Bhi Ramesvara Bhiman is an American singer-songwriter. After co-founding the rock band Hippie Grenade in 2002 in Santa Cruz, he later moved to San Francisco, where he released his debut solo album Cookbook in 2007. His second album, Bhiman, was released in January 2012 to positive reviews. It peaked at No. 28 on the Top Heatseekers chart and No. 15 on the Billboard Folk Albums chart. In 2012 Bhiman performed on Later... with Jools Holland, and he was subsequently asked to open Chris Cornell's 2013 North American tour. Bhiman participated in a tribute concert to Prince at Carnegie Hall in 2013, alongside artists such as Elvis Costello and D'Angelo. His cover EP Substitute Preacher was released in 2013, with renditions of late 1970s to early 1980s hard rock hits. His third solo album, Rhythm & Reason, was released in 2015 to positive reviews from publications such as American Songwriter, Irish Times, and The Guardian, with the latter opining that "he has a no-nonsense, gutsy vocal style and a batch of inventive songs" which "pair tuneful, sturdy, all-American melodies with often bleak and humorous lyrics."

In 2016, Bhiman contributed the song "With Love from Russia" to Dave Eggers' 30 Days 30 Songs project. It was the third song released in the series, which raised funds for democratic causes ahead of the 2016 U.S. Elections.

In 2018, The Wall Street Journal announced that Bhiman's latest album, Peace of Mind would be released as a podcast on the Critical Frequency network. Each episode will revolve around a song and its political theme and will include conversations w/ notable guests like Reza Aslan, Dave Eggers, LaDoris Cordell, Gaby Moreno, and attorneys from the ACLU. The podcast will launch January 18, 2019.

Starting in March 2020, Bhiman's cover of the Dire Straits song "Walk Of Life" was used in the Comcast Xfinity ad "Working A Little Differently", which was produced in response to the COVID-19 pandemic.

== Early life and education ==
Bhi Ramesvara Bhiman was born and raised in St. Louis, Missouri. His parents are of Sri Lankan Tamil heritage. Both Bhiman and his older brother Arjunan are named for characters in the Mahabharata; Bhima and Arjuna are two of the Pandava warrior brothers. Bhiman had an all-American childhood that he has referred to as "a sort of Brown Norman Rockwell existence with lots of running around in creeks and playing baseball". He began playing guitar at age nine.

When Bhiman was 13, an injury during a baseball tournament in Paducah, Kentucky kept him off the field for six months. He passed the time playing his brother's guitar and discovered a strong musical sensibility. As a teenager, Bhiman played electric guitar, and fell in love with hard rock bands like AC/DC and Black Sabbath, as well as Seattle's grunge scene. He attended the University of California Santa Cruz.

== Music career ==
=== Early years and Bhiman (2002–2012) ===
Bhiman formed the band Hippie Grenade in 2002 with Chris Thalmann and Steven Reilly while still attending school in Santa Cruz. With Bhiman as main songwriter and lyricist, after playing primarily at Santa Cruz house parties the band went through several lineup changes. Hippie Grenade later moved to San Francisco to pursue music as a career. Bhiman's debut solo album Cookbook came out in December 2007 through Hinju Records, and the following year he left Hippie Grenade to focus on his solo career.

In 2011, he began work on what would be his first nationally distributed album. The bulk of the record was tracked at Tiny Telephone Studios in San Francisco. Following those sessions, Bhiman finished the album with producer Sam Kassirer (Lake Street Dive, Josh Ritter) at the Great North Sound Society in Parsonsfield, Maine. The album, entitled Bhiman, was released in 2012 and earned rave reviews from publications like The New York Times, The Washington Post, and rock critic Robert Christgau of NPR's All Things Considered. Bhiman peaked at No. 28 on the Top Heatseekers chart during the second week of February in 2012. It also peaked at No. 15 that same week on the Billboard Folk Albums chart.

=== EP and touring (2013–2014) ===
In November 2012, Bhiman performed on Later... with Jools Holland on the BBC. While on the show he met the band Soundgarden, and was subsequently asked to open Chris Cornell's 2013 North American tour. For the tour's seven weeks, Bhiman and Cornell performed the songs "Hunger Strike" by Temple of the Dog and Audioslave's "Like a Stone" together. He participated in a tribute concert to Prince on March 8, 2013, at Carnegie Hall, alongside artists such as Elvis Costello and D'Angelo. He performed an acoustic version of "When Doves Cry", with the rendition praised as a concert highlight by Rolling Stone and Entertainment Weekly, with the latter writing that Bhiman "transformed "When Doves Cry" into a foreboding murder ballad. In spinning the song in a different direction, Bhiman made a song everybody knew backwards into a wholly new thing."

After starting the project in 2012, Bhiman's cover EP Substitute Preacher was self-released on May 14, 2013. The release included late 1970s to early 1980s hits by artists like Dire Straits, AC/DC and Dio. The lead single, a version of "Walk of Life" by Dire Straits, was released on May 13, 2013, with a music video featuring footage of Buster Keaton. Afterwards he toured in support of the album, and also continued to interact with Soundgarden. In 2014 the band invited Bhiman onstage to perform the song "Superunknown" with them at Shoreline Amphitheater. He also developed a friendship with Soundgarden guitarist Kim Thayil, and a year later the two interviewed each other for the Talkhouse Podcast.

=== Rhythm and Reason (2015) ===
External videos
- Bhi Bhiman feat. Rhiannon Giddens "Up in Arms" Music Video (July 6, 2015)

The lead single for his third full-length solo album, "Moving to Brussels", was released through Speakeasy on March 24, 2015. According to Bhiman, the track had been written while on tour in Belgium with Rosanne Cash, and he described it as "an immigrant's story described as a love song." He was interviewed on air by NPR about his upcoming album Rhythm & Reason on May 15, 2015, with the album released through his own imprint BooCoo Music on May 18, 2015, in conjunction with the Thirty Tigers label.

American Songwriter praised both the album's songwriting and the additions by producer and multi-instrumentalist Sam Kassirer, and the album also received positive reviews from Irish Times and The Guardian, which stated that "he has a no-nonsense, gutsy vocal style and a batch of inventive songs." The album deals largely with the themes of "immigrants and xenophobia", and the track "Up in Arms" featured vocalist multi-instrumentalist Rhiannon Giddens. For the music video of "Moving to Brussels", Bhiman recruited actor and comedian Keegan-Michael Key of the Key & Peele show to join him in a parody of the movie Whiplash. The two met while performing on the live radio show Wits, which is produced by Minnesota Public Radio. He also appeared on Strangers Again, an album of duets by folk singer Judy Collins, singing Hallelujah.

== Style and influences ==
According to The Guardian, Bhiman's songs "pair tuneful, sturdy, all-American melodies with often bleak and humorous lyrics." Bhiman's voice and songwriting have been favorably compared to folk and country artists such as Nina Simone, Woody Guthrie, Bill Withers, Randy Newman, and John Prine among others. Bhiman has cited diverse artists and genres as influences on his sound, including folk and hard rock. He has cited guitarist and songwriter Kim Thayil as a particularly important musical influence.

== Discography ==
=== Solo albums ===
Full-length solo albums by Bhi Bhiman
Year	Album title	Release details	Chart peaks	
Year	Album title	Release details	US Heat	US Folk
2007	Cookbook	Released: December 2007; Label: CD Baby / Hinju; Format: CD, digital download	—	—
2012	Bhiman	Released: January 24, 2012; Label: Boocoo Music / Tummy Touch; Format: CD, digital download	28	15
2015	Rhythm & Reason	Released: May 18, 2015; Label: Boocoo Music / Thirty Tigers; Format: CD, digital, vinyl	—	—
"—" denotes a recording that did not chart or was not released in that territory.

=== EPs ===
EPs by Bhi Bhiman
Year	Album title	Release details
2013	Substitute Preacher – Covers EP	Released: May 14, 2013; Label: Self-released; Format: CD, digital download

=== Singles ===
Incomplete list of songs by Bhi Bhiman
Year	Title	Album	Release details
2015	"Up In Arms" (feat. Rhiannon Giddens)	Rhythm & Reason	BooCoo Records (July 6, 2015)
2015	"Moving to Brussels (Sub Commander Remix)" (ft. John Dragonetti)	Single only	BooCoo Records (July 6, 2015)
2016	"With Love from Russia"	30 Days, 30 Songs	Self-released (October 14, 2016)
2017	"(What's so Funny 'Bout) Peace, Love, And Understanding"	1,000 Days, 1,000 Songs	Self-released (January 25, 2017)

== See also ==
- List of singer-songwriters
