= Shotty Horroh =

British rapper, singer, songwriter and actor

- Born: Adam Steven Rooney; 22 September 1986 (age 39); Harpurhey, Manchester, England
- Genres: Hip hop; rock; alternative rock; alternative hip hop; trap; cloud rap; grime; EDM trap; rap rock
- Occupations: Rapper; singer
- Years active: 2000-present
- Labels: Sony Music Canada; mau5trap
- Website: www.shottyhorrohmusic.com

Adam Steven Rooney (born 22 September 1986), better known by his stage name Shotty Horroh, is a British rapper, singer, songwriter and actor. In 2017, Shotty Horroh signed a four-album record deal with Sony Music Canada and released his major label debut album titled Salt of the Earth. He is also known as a battle rapper. A rap battle of his, with over 26 million views on YouTube, caught the attention of other artists, including Canadian electronic music producer Deadmau5. Deadmau5 and Shotty Horroh have collaborated on multiple songs; including "Are You Not Afraid" and "Okay", and most recently "Legendary".

Shotty Horroh has worked with other hip hop artists including Kool G Rap, Royce Da 5'9", and most recently with Tory Lanez on their single "Some More".

Shotty Horroh is also the only featured artist on James Arthur's 2016 album Back from the Edge. He is a supporter of Manchester City.

== Career ==
Alchemist has produced a song for Shotty Horroh titled "The Future". The song features Bronx artist Cory Gunz and was released in 2009 under the label Brute Force Records & Highrise Entertainment.

Shotty Horroh released an EP called Free Drugs EP in July 2016.

He featured in his first film as an actor with the release of VS., a battle rap film that premiered in October 2018.

=== 2017 ===
In July 2017, Shotty Horroh was signed to the label mau5trap.

On 20 November 2017, he announced he had signed a four-album record deal with Sony Music.

=== 2018 ===
On 8 June 2018, Shotty Horroh released his debut single on a major label, titled "Shudehill".

His debut album was released on 12 October 2018.

=== 2020 ===
On 13 March 2020, Shotty Horroh released his long-awaited EP Misery Loves Company.

== Discography ==
=== Albums ===
- The Beast Vol. 1 (2009)
- UC Me (2009)
- The Beast Vol. 2 (2010)
- Manchester 2 New York (2011)
- Dead Bodies & Junk Food (2012)
- Xombie Xoo (2013)
- Sixteen Minutes Past 3 (2015)
- Salt of the Earth (2018)
- Scum of the Earth (2022)

=== Extended plays ===
- The Wall (2014)
- Free Drugs (2016)
- Misery Loves Company (2020)

=== Singles ===
- "FUDT (F*** Up da Ting)" (2016)
- "Some More" (featuring Tory Lanez) (2017)
- "Legendary" (with Deadmau5) (2017)
- "Shudehill" (2018)
- "Dirty Old Town" (2018)
- "Are You Not Afraid" (with Deadmau5) (2019)
