= Legendary (Deadmau5 and Shotty Horroh song) =

Single by Deadmau5 and Shotty Horroh
- Released: August 25, 2017
- Recorded: 2016
- Genre: Hip hop
- Length: 2:20
- Label: Mau5trap
- Songwriter(s): Joel Zimmerman, Adam Rooney
- Producer(s): Deadmau5, Shotty Horroh

Deadmau5 singles chronology
| "Let Go" (2016) | "Legendary" (2017) | "Drama Free" (2018) |

Shotty Horroh singles chronology
| "Some More" (2017) | "Legendary" (2017) | "Shudehill" (2018) |

Music video
- Legendary on YouTube

"Legendary" is a song by Canadian electronic music producer Deadmau5 with British rapper Shotty Horroh. An earlier edit of the song was uploaded to Deadmau5's YouTube channel in December 2016, and the song was officially released through Mau5trap on August 25, 2017, with a music video for the song released on September 11, 2017.

== Background ==
Zimmerman first revealed that he would collaborate with Rooney on a Twitch livestream in 2016. On December 21, 2016, Zimmerman unofficially released an early edit of "Legendary" on his YouTube channel. This version featured an explicit voice sample of Donald Trump, which was omitted in the final release. The song also contains samples of Mr. Troublemaker" and "Love Comes from the Most Unexpected Places" by singer Táta Vega. Seven months later, on July 21, 2017, Shotty Horroh officially signed to Mau5trap and confirmed future releases.

== Music video ==
The music video for "Legendary" was released through Mau5trap's official YouTube channel on September 11, 2017. It features Shotty Horroh rapping, additional footage of Deadmau5 in his studio, and various YouTube comments.

== Track listing ==
Digital download
| No. | Title | Length |
|---|---|---|
| 1. | "Legendary" | 2:20 |

== Release history ==
| Country | Date | Format | Label |
|---|---|---|---|
| Worldwide | August 25, 2017 | Digital download | mau5trap |
