= Full Circle Nightmare =

Studio album by Kyle Craft
- Released: February 2, 2018
- Genre: Indie rock
- Length: 39:57
- Label: Sub Pop

Kyle Craft chronology
Dolls of Highland (2016)	Full Circle Nightmare (2018)	Showboat Honey (2019)

Professional ratings
Aggregate scores
Source	Rating
Metacritic	67/100
Review scores
Source	Rating
AllMusic	3.5/5 stars
PopMatters	(9/10)
Pitchfork	(4.1/10)

Full Circle Nightmare is the second studio by American musician Kyle Craft. It was released in February 2018 under Sub Pop Records.

== Track listing ==
No.	Title	Length
1.	"Fever Dream Girl"	2:47
2.	"Full Circle Nightmare"	3:20
3.	"Heartbreak Junky"	4:36
4.	"The Rager"	3:31
5.	"Exile Rag"	4:48
6.	"Belmont (One Trick Pony)"	3:04
7.	"Slick & Delta Queen"	4:16
8.	"Fake Magic Angel"	4:31
9.	"Bridge City Rose"	4:35
10.	"Gold Calf Moan"	4:29
