= Las Vegas (In the Hills of Donegal) =

1991 song performed by Goats Don't Shave

Song by Goats Don't Shave

from the album The Rusty Razor
- Released: 1991
- Genre: Celtic rock, Folk rock
- Length: 3:47
- Label: Cooking Vinyl
- Songwriter: Pat Gallagher
- Producer: Mudd Wallace

This song is not to be confused with the Bridie Gallagher song "The Hills of Donegal".

"Las Vegas (In the Hills of Donegal)" is a song by the Irish folk rock group Goats Don't Shave. It was a top 10 hit for the band in 1991, reaching #4 on the Irish singles chart.

== Lyrics and meaning ==
The lyrics of the song tell of the speaker's desire to turn County Donegal, described to be fame-less and unknown, into a gambling hub, ala Las Vegas. He speaks of walling it off from the rest of Ireland while legalizing casinos and brothels. There are several references made to people from popular and business culture including Jack the Ripper, the Man in the Iron Mask, Neil Blaney, Brigitte Nielsen, Mike Tyson and Donald Trump.

== Release and reception ==
It was first released by the Goats Don't Shave in 1992 with the release of their album, The Rusty Razor. The song found new popularity in the 2000s, not only among people from County Donegal, but people from all over Ireland. The album was a mix of modern material and traditional Irish folk written mostly by Pat Gallagher.

== Cover versions ==
The song has been covered by many other artists including The Dubliners.

- Charlie and the Bhoys
- Mike Denver
- Scythian
- Nathan Carter
- The Irish Rovers
- The Saw Doctors

== Legacy ==
The song was blared from the Croke Park PA system after Donegal won the Sam Maguire Cup in 2012. It was again played on the Croke Park PA system just before Donegal were presented with the National League Division 2(football) Cup in April 2019.

== See also ==
- Donald Trump in music
