= Kane Strang =

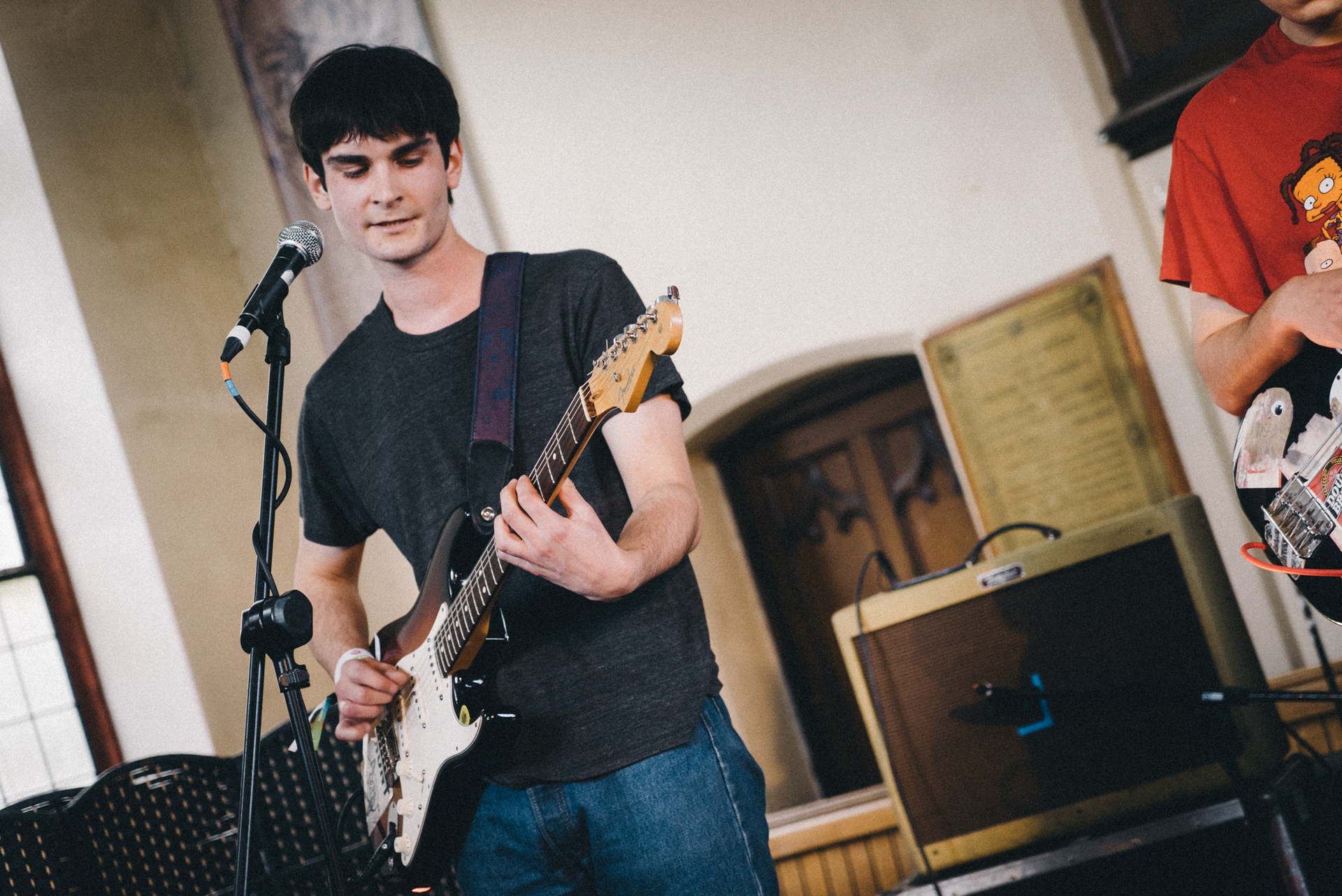
- Strang performing in 2017

Background information
- Birth name: Kane James Strang
- Born: Dunedin, New Zealand
- Genres: Lo-fi; Psychedelia
- Occupations: singer; songwriter
- Instrument: vocals
- Years active: 2013–present
- Labels: Dead Oceans; Ba Da Bing

Kane James Strang is a New Zealand musician from Dunedin. He has released a demo album, A Pebble and a Paper Crane (2013), and three studio albums: Blue Cheese (Ba Da Bing Records, 2016) Two Hearts and No Brain (Dead Oceans, 2017), and Happy to Perform (Kane Strang, 2021). Strang also has several singles that no longer can be found through any of his public profiles; Standstill (2020), In Thailand (2014) Together with bassist Rassani Tolovaa and drummer Mitchell Innes, Strang formed the band Office Dog, who released their first album, Spiel, in January 2024.

== Background ==
Strang grew up in Dunedin, New Zealand around a family of musicians.

After completing secondary school, Strang co-founded a band, Dinosaur Sanctuary. They released their debut album, A Public Toilet Told Me Nothing Gets Better, in 2013.

Later that same year, Strang travelled to Germany, staying with his childhood friend, Rassani Tolovaa.

During his stay, Strang recorded multiple songs in a World War II bomb shelter. Upon returning to New Zealand, Strang self-released these songs in his debut EP, titled A Pebble and a Paper Crane.
