= Last Day In =

2021 single by Kodak Black

Single by Kodak Black
- Released: January 23, 2021
- Length: 3:09
- Label: Dollaz N Dealz; Sniper Gang; Atlantic
- Songwriters: Bill Kapri; Sebastien Jasinski; Luca Meloni; Derek Garcia
- Producers: LenoxBeatmaker; Luca Vialli; Dyryk

Kodak Black singles chronology
"Vultures Cry 2" (2020)	"Last Day In" (2021)	"Every Balmain" (2021)

Music video
- "Last Day In" on YouTube

"Last Day In" is a single by American rapper Kodak Black, released on January 23, 2021. Produced by LenoxBeatmaker, Luca Vialli and Dyryk, it is his first song since his release from prison that month, which he talks about in the song.

== Background ==
In 2019, Kodak Black was arrested for making false statements to buy a firearm and sentenced to 46 months in prison. On January 20, 2021, his sentence was commuted by President Donald Trump. Following his release, Black tweeted, "I want to thank the president @realdonaldtrump for his commitment to justice reform and shortening my sentence. I also want to thank everyone for their support and love. It means more than you will ever know. I want to continue giving back, learning and growing."

== Content ==
The song finds Kodak Black reflecting on his release from prison and return to home, as well as how he wants to spend time out of jail, including getting sushi and some "coochie" and a head massage. He acknowledges his lawyer Bradford Cohen ("I told my lawyer, 'Boy, I love you like a daddy'") and the pardon ("Trump just freed me, but my favorite president is on the money"). He also shouts out to Yung Miami of City Girls in a reference to his song ("Spent my 'Christmas in Miami,' yeah, Caresha Brownlee").

== Music video ==
The music video was released on June 24, 2021.

== Charts ==
Chart performance for "Last Day In"
Chart (2021)	Peak position
US Bubbling Under Hot 100 (Billboard)	3
US Hot R&B/Hip-Hop Songs (Billboard)	39
