= Ain't Got No Home (Woody Guthrie song) =

Song written by Woody Guthrie

"Ain't Got No Home" (or "I Ain't Got No Home in This World Anymore") is a song by Woody Guthrie, released on Dust Bowl Ballads in 1940, in which the singer laments the difficulties that life presents him. It was based on a gospel song Guthrie heard on his visits to the migrant camps known variously as "Can't Feel at Home" or "I Don't Feel at Home in This World Anymore", which had been made popular by the Carter Family in 1931.

Guthrie wrote his version of the song in response to this version, in an attempt to capture more effectively the "unrelieved anger" of the Dust Bowl refugees. He was outraged by the song's message and the effects it had on the migrants, telling them to wait, and be meek. It was telling them to accept the hovels and the hunger and the disease and to not fight back. Guthrie's version parodies the original song's fundamentalist religious sentiment that the poor should accept suffering in this world for rewards in the hereafter.

An unreleased variant of the song protests the segregation at the Beach Haven apartment complex owned by Fred Trump, the father of 45th and 47th United States president Donald Trump, which he stayed at from 1950 to 1952: "Beach Haven looks like heaven / Where no black ones come to roam! / No, no, no! Old Man Trump! / Old Beach Haven ain't my home!" This is similar in topic to Guthrie's unreleased song "Old Man Trump".

== Recordings ==
Guthrie's friend Cisco Houston recorded the song for his 1960 album Cisco Houston Sings Songs of the Open Road.

Bruce Springsteen recorded the song for Folkways: A Vision Shared, a 1988 compendium of song recordings written by Guthrie and Lead Belly.

British folk musician Billy Bragg covered the song for his 2013 album Tooth & Nail.

Bob Dylan performed the song with The Band at both the afternoon and evening concerts for A Tribute To Woody Guthrie at Carnegie Hall on January 20, 1968. A recording of the first performance was released in 1972 on "A Tribute To Woody Guthrie Part One" Columbia KC 31171.
