= Anthony D'Amato =

American singer-songwriter (born 1987)

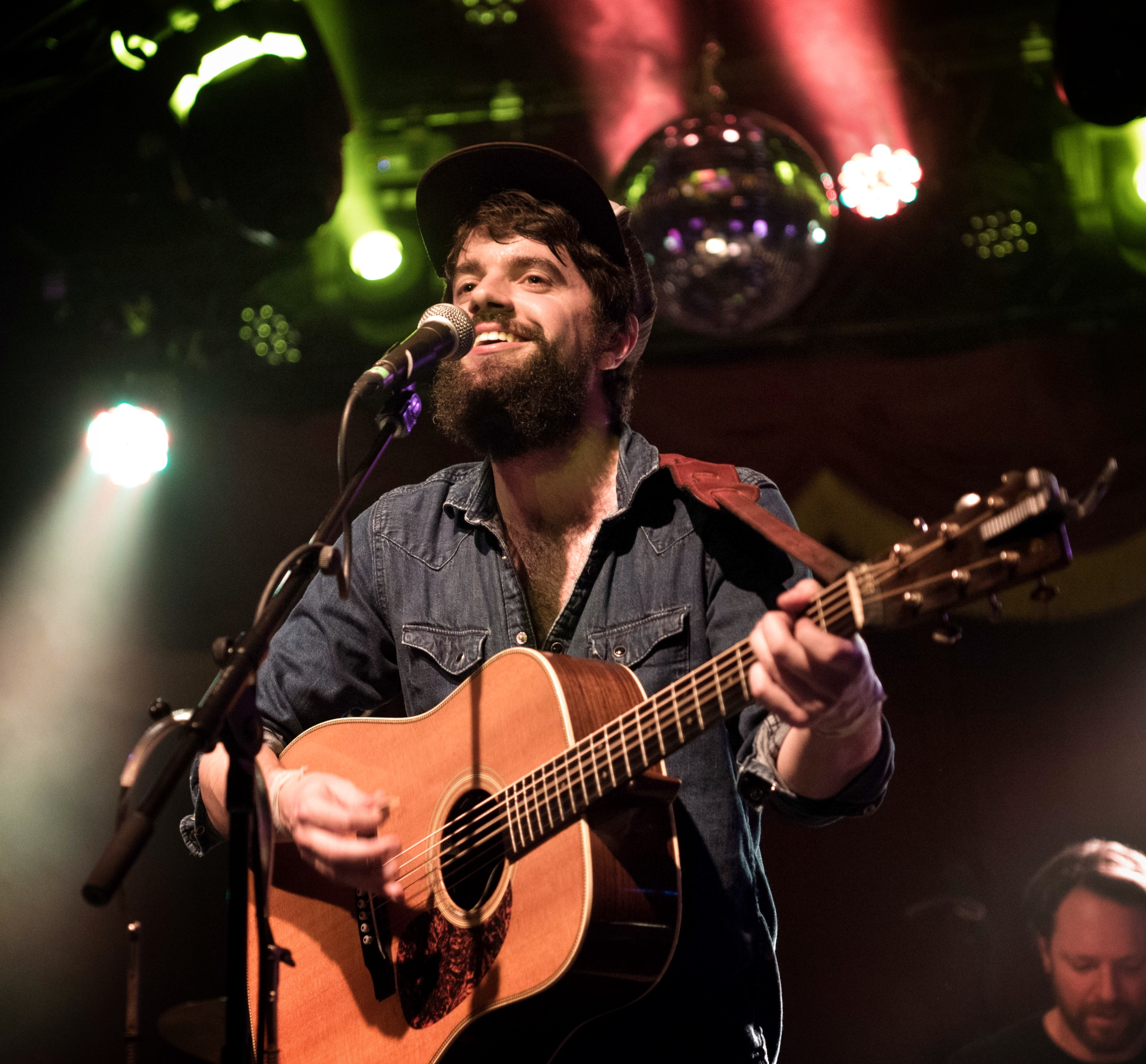
- D'Amato at Brooklyn Bowl in 2016

Background information
- Born: November 27, 1987 (age 38); Blairstown, New Jersey, U.S.
- Education: Princeton University
- Genres: Indie folk; rock; americana
- Occupations: Songwriter; singer; musician
- Years active: 2010–present
- Label: New West Records
- Spouse: Jane Beaird
- Website: Official website

Anthony D'Amato (born November 27, 1987), is an American songwriter and singer. His latest album is 2022's At First There Was Nothing.

== Early life ==
D'Amato grew up in Blairstown, New Jersey, and attended Blair Academy on a scholarship. His father Chris D'Amato was an editor for rail enthusiast magazines such as Railroad Model Craftsman and Railfan & Railroad, and often took D'Amato and his older brother Nicholas on cross country trips to various industrial heritage sites. Chris also introduced his sons to the music of Bruce Springsteen. D'Amato describes the moment he decided to pursue a musical career to listening to The Fine Art of Self Destruction from Jesse Malin on a Walkman while in the backseat of his parents' car traveling to a Springsteen concert. D'Amato attended Princeton University, where he recorded his first album, Down Wires, in a dormitory during his senior year, graduating in 2010.

== Music career ==
He released the record independently in 2010, catching the attention of NPR, which called his song "My Father's Son" a "modern folk gem," and the World Cafe, which featured him in their emerging artist series "Next." D'Amato followed it up with another home recording, Paper Back Bones, which made BBC Scotland's Best Americana Albums of 2012, and was described by host Ricky Ross as "one of [our] favourites of all time."

In 2014, D'Amato released his New West Records debut, The Shipwreck From The Shore, which was inspired in part by his time studying with the Pulitzer Prize-winning Irish poet Paul Muldoon and earned widespread critical acclaim, with NPR noting that "he writes in the tradition of Bruce Springsteen or Josh Ritter" and USA Today saying it "strikes every right note." The album was recorded with producer Sam Kassirer (Josh Ritter, Langhorne Slim) at The Great North Sound Society in Maine with members of Bon Iver and Megafaun. Songs from the record racked up millions of plays on Spotify and turned up on the ABC series Nashville, while the album earned additional praise everywhere from The New York Times and The Wall Street Journal to New York magazine and Billboard.

D'Amato returned in 2016 with Cold Snap, recorded in Omaha, NE, with producer Mike Mogis (Bright Eyes, First Aid Kit) and featuring performances by Conor Oberst and members of Bright Eyes, The Faint, and Cursive. Rolling Stone named him an "Artist You Need To Know", and D'Amato made his national TV debut on CBS This Morning.

D'Amato's latest album, 2022's At First There Was Nothing, marked his debut release for the Blue Rose label and earned similar acclaim, with American Songwriter calling it "a new masterpiece" and Mojo awarding it four stars.

D'Amato is also a member of the folk rock supergroup Fantastic Cat, which released its first album, The Very Best Of Fantastic Cat, and made its national TV debut in 2022. Rolling Stone called the album "a wildly satisfying collection of folk-rock, country, Americana, and good old rock & roll" and dubbed the band "the supergroup-you-need-to-know."

== Photography ==
In addition to his musical work, D'Amato is also an avid photographer whose work has appeared in publications from The Denver Post to TimeOut. Working under the name "Steel Rail Blues" (a reference to the Gordon Lightfoot song of the same name), D'Amato has a large following on Instagram and TikTok for his railroad photography, which focuses primarily on steam trains around the world.

In 2022, D'Amato also released his album "At First There Was Nothing" as a book of his photography, complete with an essay about the record, song lyrics, and an accompanying download of the music.

== Personal life ==
D'Amato is married to Jane Beaird, an artist who has made artwork for both D'Amato's solo career and Fantastic Cat.

== Discography ==
- Down Wires (2010)
- Paper Back Bones (2012)
- The Shipwreck From The Shore (2014)
- Cold Snap (2016)
- At First There Was Nothing (2022)

See also: Fantastic Cat § Discography
