= Jordan Kurland =

Jordan Kurland (born 1972) is a founding partner of Brilliant Corners Management, a music and artist management company with offices in San Francisco, New York, and Seattle. He is the co-founder of the Treasure Island Music Festival and a partner in the independent music festival, Noise Pop.

== Career ==
Music management and festivals

Kurland moved to San Francisco in 1995 to work at David Lefkowitz/Figurehead Management where he assisted with Charlie Hunter, the Melvins, and Primus.

Kurland's Treasure Island Music Festival ran from 2007 to 2018 and was nominated several times as the Music Festival of the Year by Pollstar magazine. The Noise Pop festival has featured many musicians including, Death Cab for Cutie, The White Stripes, Spoon and The Flaming Lips.

Political activism

In 2004, helped to curate and produce the Future Soundtrack of America CD and "Future Dictionary of America" with author Dave Eggers featuring R.E.M., Yeah Yeah Yeahs, and Tom Waits.

In 2012, Kurland and Eggers founded the website 90 Days, 90 Reasons, which featured opinion pieces from contributors including Anne Hathaway, Shepard Fairey, and Ben Stiller who gave their opinions on why they thought President Obama should be re-elected. Using a similar idea, he and Eggers collaborated during the 2016 presidential election to organize the 30 Days, 30 Songs campaign, which was an effort to bring together musicians to produce protest songs against Donald Trump. A new song was released each day in the last month before the election.

In 2020, Kurland and Eggers organized two digital fundraising albums, Good Music to Avert the Collapse of American Democracy - Volumes 1 & 2, that raised over $550k for Voter's Rights organizations. During the 2020 presidential election, Kurland collaborated with Nick Stern for an online concert series called Team Joe Sings in support for Joe Biden.

Kurland was a member of the entertainment advisory committee for Barack Obama's 2012 and Hillary Clinton's 2016 presidential campaigns.

=== Boards ===
Kurland currently sits on the boards of the Stern Grove Festival, McSweeney's and The Lab. He previously served on the boards of the Independent On-Line Distribution Alliance (IODA), 826 National, Marin Headlands Center for the Arts, and the Bay Area chapter of NARAS.

== Representation ==
Brilliant Corners represents Death Cab for Cutie, The Postal Service, She & Him, Toro Y Moi, Pup, Soccer Mommy, The New Pornographers, Best Coast, Real Estate, Josh Ritter, Squirrel Flower, Jimmy Tamborello, and Gilligan Moss. Past clients that Kurland's company has worked with include the Estate of Elliott Smith, Bob Mould, The Head and the Heart, John Doe, Feist, Dan Deacon, Rogue Wave & Grizzly Bear.
