= Kyle Craft =

American singer-songwriter

- Born: January 9, 1989 (age 37); Shreveport, Louisiana, U.S.
- Origin: Portland, Oregon, U.S.
- Genres: Glam rock; southern rock
- Occupations: Singer-songwriter; musician
- Instruments: Vocals; guitar
- Label: Sub Pop

Kyle Craft (born January 9, 1989), is an American singer-songwriter and musician based in Portland, Oregon. He released his debut album, Dolls of Highland from Sub Pop records in 2016.

== Biography ==
Craft was born in Shreveport, Louisiana. First drawn to music through the Baptist church choir in his early childhood, Craft was introduced to rock music through a David Bowie compilation that he found in Kmart. At the age of 15, he started playing the acoustic guitar his grandmother gave him for Christmas. He began to record songs on a laptop that he bought in 2007.

Craft relocated first in Austin, Texas, where he formed the band Gashcat releasing the album, Reunion! in 2011 followed by the Devil Kid Demos EP. The band broke up in 2013 due in part to the persistent negative comparison to Neutral Milk Hotel. Craft moved to Portland, where he started writing his solo debut album. After recording the tracks at the laundry room of his Shreveport home with a DIY rig and his laptop, he reconnected with Sub Pop Records, whom he has been in touch with after previously passing over a demo. The tracks were mixed by Brandon Summers and Benjamin Weikel of The Helio Sequence, and Craft released his debut album, Dolls of Highland, in April 2016. He assembled a live band following its release and embarked a tour. Craft was selected as the opening act for Drive-By Truckers Fall 2016 tour.

== Musical style and artistry ==
AllMusic's James Christopher Monger described Craft as "a singer/songwriter with a robust, full-throated wail and knack for pairing Stones-ian hooks and Dylan-esque wordplay with glam-kissed pop swagger." Rolling Stone wrote that he sounds like "a swamp bar jukebox loaded with British glitter and Seventies Southern rock" and turns his tracks into a "poetic gumbo of Southern roots, electric folk and preening glam rock." His sound also features elements from alternative country and Americana.

Craft cites Bob Dylan as an influence over his distinctive vocal style. His other influences include David Bowie, the Beach Boys and Father John Misty.

== Live band members ==
Live band members as adapted from Willamette Week:

- Kyle Craft – vocals, various instruments
- Haven Multz – drums
- Austin Barone – bass
- Jeremy Kale Padot – guitar
- Ben Steinmetz – organ
- Kevin Clark – piano

== Discography ==
Studio albums

- Dolls of Highland (2016)
- Full Circle Nightmare (2018)
- Showboat Honey (2019)

Compilations

- Girl Crazy (2017)

Live Albums

- LIVE! From a Dying Planet (2020)

Music videos

- "Eye of a Hurricane" (2016, dir. Tyler Bertram)
- "The Rager" (2017)
- "2 Ugly 4 NY" (2019, dir. Eleanor Petry)
- "Deathwish Blue" (2019)
- "Broken Mirror Pose" (2019, dir. Kyle Craft)
