= Pea-pickers =

Derogatory term for migrant workers in the Great Depression

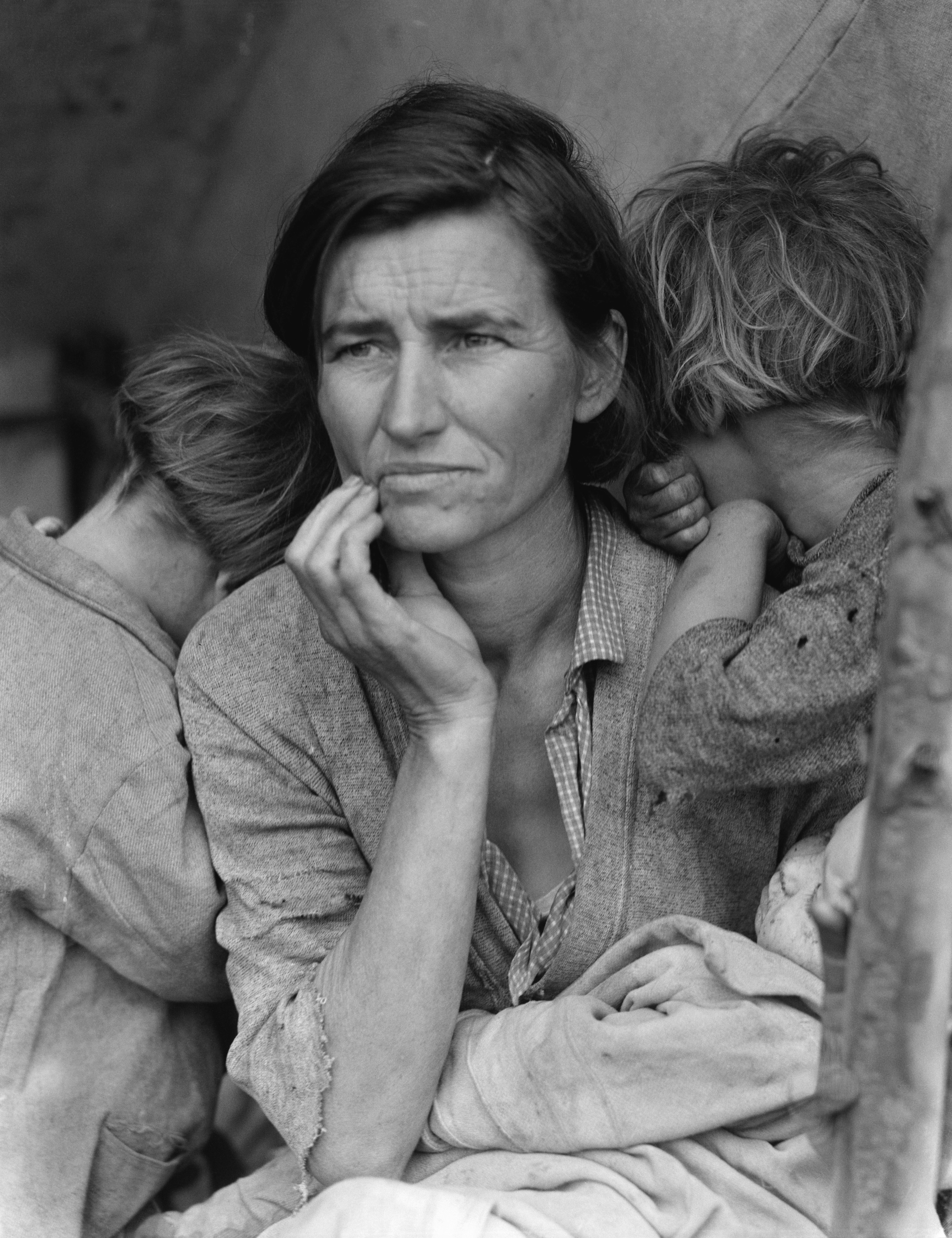
Dorothea Lange's Migrant Mother depicts Florence Owens Thompson, a mother of seven children and migrant worker, in March 1936. Lange's photograph was instrumental in raising awareness about the conditions faced by migrant workers.

A pea-picker is a derogatory reference to poor, migrant workers during the Great Depression. These people were unskilled, poorly educated workers, employable only in menial jobs, such as harvesting crops and, as such, received poor wages for working long hours under dreadful conditions. Some of these people were photographed by Dorothea Lange.

The term "pea picker" is used to distinguish a group as a lower social class from some other similar group, such as the "pea-picking" Smiths, as opposed to the "respectable" Smiths. Temporary communities of pea-pickers are called pea picker camps and farms that employed them were pea-picker farms.

== Dust Bowl migrants ==
During the Great Depression, the American government, without due process, deported between 1 and 2 million American citizens and legal residents of Mexican descent. This mass deportation, known as the Mexican Repatriation, took place from 1929 to 1939 and was empowered by panic of an alarmingly high unemployment rate sweeping over the United States at this time. The Dust Bowl was the name given to the Great Plains region devastated by drought in 1930s depression-ridden America. This triggered the migration of men, women, and children seeking work, food, and shelter making their way to California, hoping to find opportunity and a better life. Most of the migrants moving west were not farmers, having lived either in a town or city doing some kind of blue-collar work. They headed west unaware of the poor living conditions and only seasonal work that largely depended on the weather. The Midwesterners affected by both the Depression and Dust Bowl packed up their families and relocated in hopes of finding a chance at the American dream, having realized that the drought and dust storms would not end anytime soon. Some sold what they could not bring along and began to drive west on Route 66. The term pea-picker was used to describe these particular group migrant workers in a negative context. The workers who picked these peas before the Dust Bowl migration and Mexican Repatriation had taken place were mostly Mexicans, Filipinos, and single white males before the Depression. This new work force of unskilled migrant families from the Dust Bowl now took their place and helped coin the term pea-pickers. The Dust Bowl was a severe environmental disaster that struck the Great Plains region of the United States during the 1930s, exacerbating the economic hardships of the Great Depression. Prolonged drought and poor agricultural practices led to massive dust storms that rendered vast areas of farmland unusable. This environmental catastrophe forced tens of thousands of families, particularly from Oklahoma, Texas, Kansas, and Arkansas, to migrate in search of better living conditions and employment opportunities.

These displaced individuals, often referred to as "Okies," a term derived from the large number of migrants from Oklahoma, became part of a larger group of itinerant agricultural workers. Many of them ended up on the West Coast, particularly in California, where they hoped to find work in the state's rich agricultural sector.

=== Living conditions and challenges ===
The influx of Dust Bowl migrants to California created significant challenges. The sudden increase in population strained the local economy and infrastructure. Migrants often found themselves living in squalid conditions in makeshift camps and shantytowns without adequate sanitation, clean water, or medical care. These camps, sometimes derogatorily called "Hoovervilles," after President Herbert Hoover, were characterized by overcrowding and lack of basic amenities.

=== Work in agriculture ===
For many Dust Bowl migrants, work in California's agricultural sector was their primary means of survival. They took on jobs as pea-pickers, cotton pickers, and fruit harvesters, often working long hours for meager pay. The transient nature of the work meant that families had to move frequently, following the harvest seasons across the state.

The labor was grueling and the wages were low, partly because of the oversupply of labor resulting from the mass migration. Employers could exploit this labor surplus, paying workers minimal wages and providing little job security.

=== Dorothea Lange and the Dust Bowl migrants ===
Dorothea Lange, a photographer for the Farm Security Administration (FSA), played a crucial role in documenting the lives of Dust Bowl migrants. Her photographs brought national attention to their plight, illustrating the human cost of the Great Depression and the Dust Bowl. Lange's work, including the famous "Migrant Mother" photograph, highlighted the resilience and suffering of these displaced families.

Lange's photograph "Migrant Mother" specifically captures the image of Florence Owens Thompson, a Dust Bowl migrant and mother of seven children, who was living in a pea-pickers camp in Nipomo, California, in 1936. This image has become one of the most iconic representations of the Great Depression, symbolizing the broader struggles of migrant workers. According to sources from the Getty Museum, the Kennedy Center, and History.com, the photograph had a profound effect on public awareness and policy, leading to increased aid and support for struggling families.

=== Government response and legacy ===
The federal government, prompted by the visibility of the migrant crisis, took steps to address the needs of these workers. Programs under the New Deal, such as the establishment of the Resettlement Administration (which later became the FSA), aimed to provide more stable housing, food, and healthcare to migrant families. These efforts were part of a broader attempt to alleviate the suffering caused by the Great Depression and environmental disasters like the Dust Bowl.

== See also ==
=== Okie ===
Migrant workers who fled the Dust Bowl region and sought agricultural work in California and other states during the Great Depression.

- Tennessee Ernie Ford, who was nicknamed "The Ol' Pea-Picker Himself"
- A popular American singer and television host known for his catchphrase "Bless your pea-pickin' heart!" and his nickname "The Ol' Pea-Picker Himself."
- White trash
- A derogatory term historically used to describe poor white people in the United States, often in the context of labor and socio-economic status.
- The Grapes of Wrath
- A novel by John Steinbeck published in 1939 that depicts the hardships faced by a family of Dust Bowl migrants. It is considered one of the greatest American novels and provides a powerful narrative of the era.
