= Dorothy Blackwell McNeil =

American club manager

Dorothy Blackwell McNeil (born Jersey City, 1950s) is recognized as a significant member of the Hoboken, Hudson County, New Jersey, community, especially for her co-ownership and management of Hoboken's Club Zanzibar (1961-1981) which hosted African-American entertainers.

== Community recognition ==
In 2006 the Hoboken Oral History Project published a chapbook entitled Recollections of Dorothy McNeil that includes photos of Hoboken, McNeil and her family, Club Zanzibar, and some of the entertainers who performed there. The project is part of Hoboken's efforts, through recollections of "longtime residents" to remember "the working-class identity and tradition of multi-ethnic living that has been disappearing as the city has gentrified." The interviewers for the oral histories, Bob Foster and Holly Metz, explain that interviewees are carefully chosen and, when the chapbook is finished, the Museum hosts an event to celebrate the "honoree." The Dorothy McNeil chapbook was ninth in a series that reached 33 volumes by 2020.

In 2010 McNeil was among 35 women honored by Hudson County (where Hoboken is situated) for having "made Hudson County history with their commitment and dedication to improve the quality of life in their communities."

In 2018 McNeil, along with fellow Hoboken celebrities photographer Dorothea Lange and sportswoman Maria Pepe, was honored by her home town with a large (150’ by 35’) mural on a commercial building's exterior wall. At the mural's unveiling Hoboken's then mayor, Ravi S. Bhalla, called the three women "trailblazers" who "made tremendous impacts on their community and the country.” DISTORT, the artist who created the mural, said his intention was to "honor Hoboken's history as a working-class and artistic city" and these women who had contributed to its "character."

== Personal life ==
McNeil was the daughter of Gladys Elizabeth Richardson, originally from the South, and David Blackwell, originally from New York State. She recalls their family as being among the earliest African-American families to live in Hoboken. When she was six weeks old, a fire broke out in the rental property where her family lived and she was "thrown out the window" to be "caught by a homeless person" who claimed her as his own after that. She had one son before marrying Charles McNeil, and also a daughter.

Charles McNeil had been a truck driver before buying in to the Zanzibar. One of his co-workers was Anthony Provenzano, who later became Head of Teamster Local 560; with Provenzano's backing, McNeil broke the color barrier at one of the local trucking companies. James Smith and Charles McNeil bought the Zanzibar in 1961; in 1963 McNeil bought Smith out. He and Dorothy met around 1971 or 1972. She had some previous experience as a model in New York City, but wasn't comfortable in that role. Through friends she was familiar with the Zanzibar and thought that she would enjoy using her modeling experience in the role of bartender there. In its later years, the Zanzibar became a neighborhood bar, remaining a fixture of local community life.

Dorothy moved away from Hoboken briefly before moving back. In her oral history she notes various cultural changes from the town she grew up in, especially relating to the African-American community and the local police.

== The Club Zanzibar's cultural significance ==
The club was "one of the last stops on the Chitlin Circuit." Acts appearing there in its first years "had to have [had] a hit record," often with the RCA and Columbia labels. African American performers included Wilson Pickett, Millie Jackson, Rufus Thomas, The Coasters, Kool and the Gang, and The Drifters. Frank Sinatra was among the white performers who appeared there; The Manhattan Transfer used the Zanzibar as their practice studio. Sterling Harrison was the last performer to appear before the Zanzibar closed in 1981.

As McNeil herself explained, the Club Zanzibar, which held 220 people, "was unique to the African-American community for two reasons": It stayed open one hour later than bars in nearby cities, so promoters wanting to get the most out of their acts would book them into the Zanzibar for that last hour, with patrons from elsewhere coming to Hoboken to enjoy the performances that often included stars from Harlem's Apollo Theater. Hoboken thereby hosted a larger range of popular acts than it would have otherwise. The second reason was that elsewhere women might be blocked from sitting at a bar, but they had free access into the Zanzibar because it was a club.

Charles McNeil regularly cashed payroll checks for workers coming in from nearby employers such as Maxwell House, the Post Office, and local truckers. As Dorothy McNeill explained, "Most people at that time (especially black people) did not have a relationship with the banks." The amount involved could be as much as $30,000-$40,000 per week. In return, people would buy at least one shot: "I have literally poured $1,000 worth of liquor at a dollar a shot ... in a night. And I didn't start to work until 6pm."

As an off-duty policeman Steve Capiello worked security at the Zanzibar before running for and becoming mayor of Hoboken.
