= Migrant Mother =

1936 photograph by Dorothea Lange

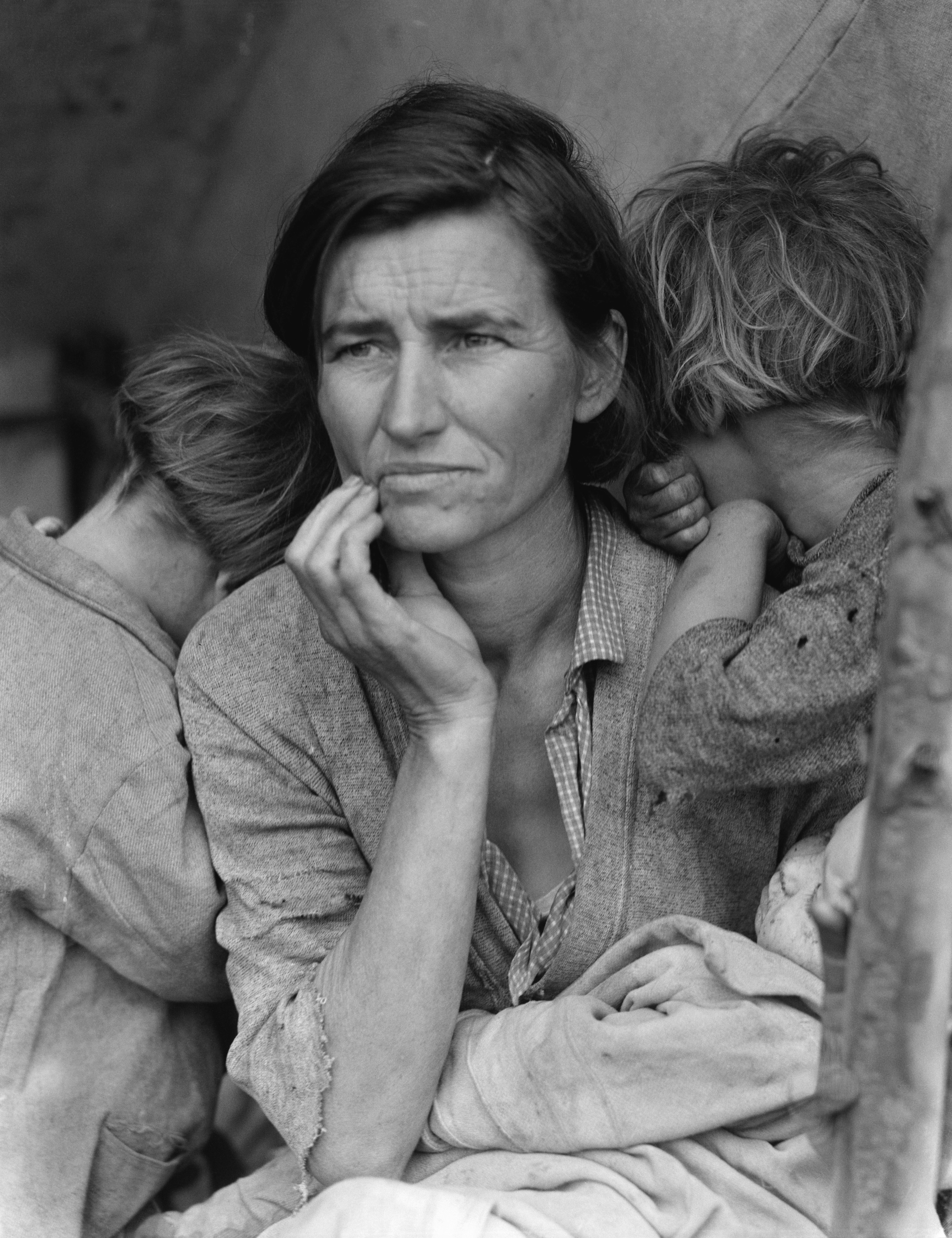
- Artist: Dorothea Lange
- Year: 1936
- Catalogue: 50989
- Medium: gelatin silver print photograph
- Subject: Florence Owens Thompson
- Dimensions: 28.3 cm × 21.8 cm (11.1 in × 8.6 in)
- Location: Museum of Modern Art, New York
- Accession: 331.1995

Migrant Mother is a photograph taken in 1936 in Nipomo, California, by American photographer Dorothea Lange during her time with the Resettlement Administration (later the Farm Security Administration). The 28.3 by 21.8 cm (11 1/8 by 8 9/16 in) gelatin silver print depicts a mother anxiously gazing into the distance, with an infant in her lap and two older children huddling close by. The photo captures the plight of migrant farm workers who arrived in California en masse looking for employment during the Great Depression. Initially anonymous, the woman in the photo was identified as Florence Owens Thompson in 1978, following the work of a journalist for the California-based newspaper The Modesto Bee.

Since its publication, Lange's work has been considered symbolic of the Great Depression. It is in the public domain and has been widely reproduced in educational material, advertisements, and other media. Today, Migrant Mother is considered to be a part of the classic canon of American art and international photography. A print is housed at the Museum of Modern Art in New York City.

== Description ==
Migrant Mother depicts a mother looking off into the distance with two of her children at her sides and an infant in her lap. Her children's faces are not shown as the children both bury their faces in their mother's shoulders. The black and white photograph print held in the Museum of Modern Art is approximately the same size as a sheet of North American printer paper (11 1/8 by 8 9/16 in).

== Execution ==
Migrant Mother was achieved through a process of deliberate and careful intervention by Lange. Although she considered herself a documentary photographer and stuck to the belief that she should not intervene in the subject of her photography, Lange manipulated the framing and the subjects to arrive at her final shot. Furthermore the photo has been retouched after capture: the mother's left thumb was removed from the foreground on the right side of the image as Lange "considered the thumb to be such a glaring defect that she apparently didn't have a second thought about removing it'.

Lange found the mother and her children by chance while driving home on a cold, rainy afternoon in March 1936, when she passed a sign reading “Pea-Pickers Camp” in Nipomo, California. She continued to drive but could not shake the image of the sign from her memory and turned around heading for the camp. In a memoir written by Lange about the photoshoot, she writes, "I was on my way and barely saw a crude sign with pointing arrow which flashed by me at the side of the road saying Pea-Pickers Camp. But out of the corner of my eye I did see it...Having well convinced myself for twenty miles that I could continue on, I did the opposite. Almost without realizing what I was doing, I made a U-turn on the empty highway". When Lange first arrived to the camp of migrant pea pickers, she took two snapshots of the mother's tent and her children. In the tent was the mother, her teenage daughter, and three young children. Realizing that these photographs lacked a central focus, Lange honed in on the mother and her children.

Lange moved closer to the tent and took a third snapshot of just the mother and her baby, asking the two young children at her side to move out of the frame. In this photograph, the mother is breastfeeding her baby as she looks down. The mother looks tired and worn in her makeshift tent home. Despite capturing an intimate moment where a mother is nursing her child, Lange sensed a flaw in the photograph – the mother's gaze. The mother was looking downward, "... as if wishing to shield herself from the scrutiny of the camera". For Lange, this expression spoiled the image. She and her colleagues tried as best they could to present their subjects as dignified human beings in order to elicit sympathy rather than ridicule. Lange sensed that she was invading her subject's privacy and was causing discomfort so she moved on to her fourth shot to regain composure.

In Lange's fourth photograph, she asks one of the children to enter the frame and to stand with her chin resting on her mother's shoulder. In this photograph, the mother is looking up into the distance with her daughter's head resting on her shoulder and her baby on her lap. The mother's expression in this photograph was now acceptable for Lange. She decided to take another but made some critical changes looking at what was captured in the background of the photograph.

Lange moved herself to the left and switched from her previously horizontal orientation to a vertical orientation of the frame. This allowed her to center the mother, the child, and the baby and left ample headroom for them. Additionally, moving left cut out the details in the background which she preferred not to show because of the possible implications that might sour viewers' image of her subjects. Lange took one last picture of the mother and her children, but this time she asked a second child to step in the frame. There were now a total of three children in the frame. The mother held her baby in her lap and her two children stood at her sides. In order to remove any possibility of competing gazes and any exchanges that might create unwanted effects, Lange asked both children to turn their backs towards the camera and place their hands on their mother's shoulders. Lange then moved closer to the mother, focusing her at the center of the frame and excluding any other background such that the mother and her children were the only objects in the frame. This last photograph is now known as Migrant Mother. According to Lange, she was only at the camp for ten minutes. After her last shot, she finally closed her camera and went home.

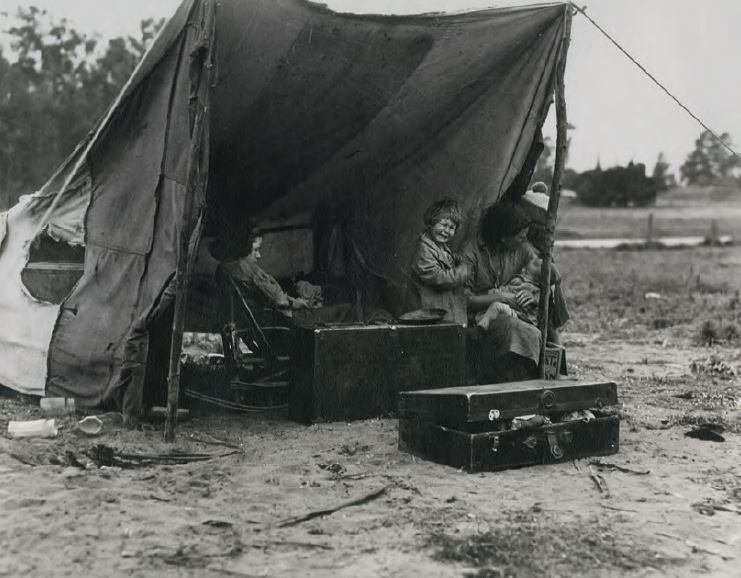
1

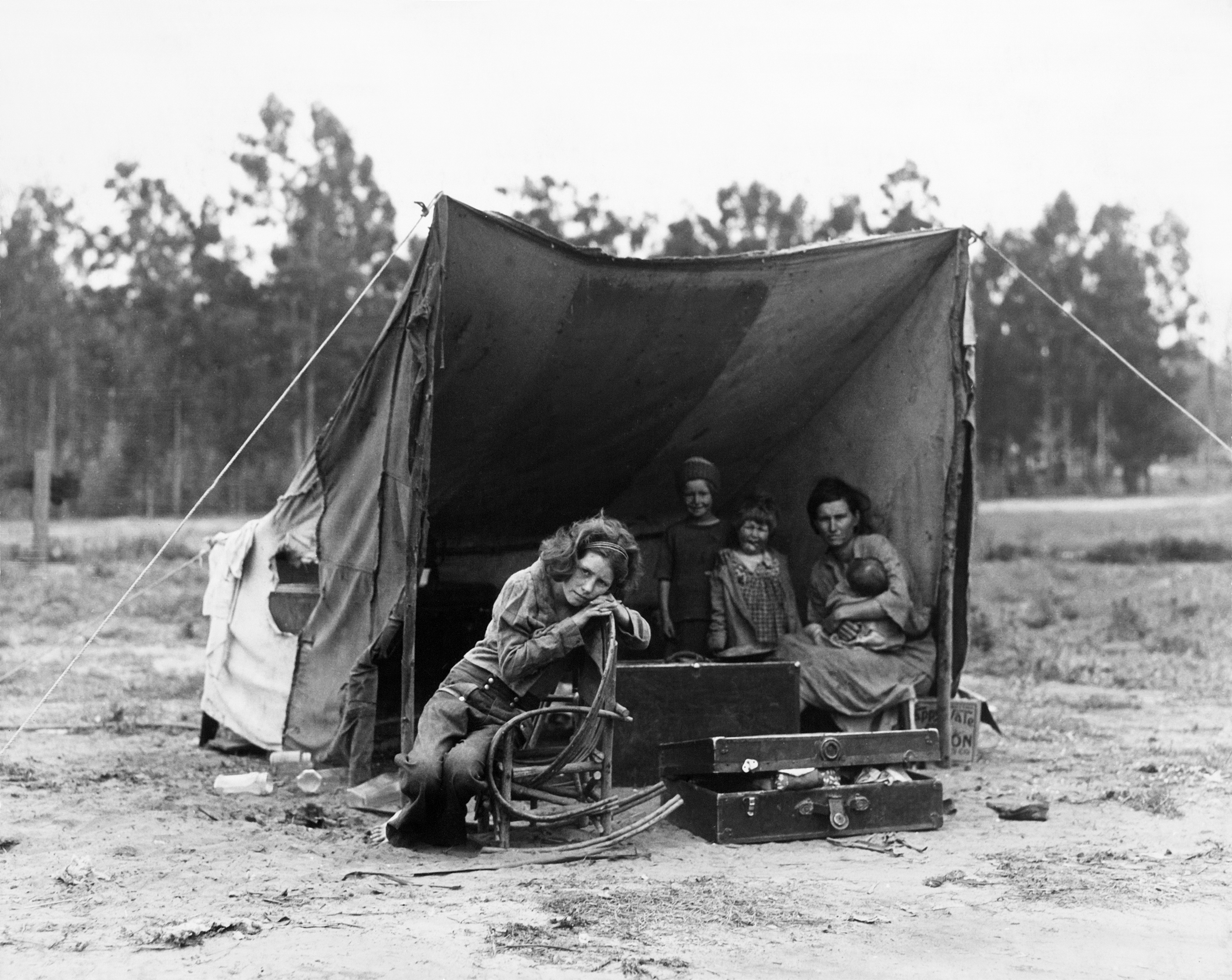
2

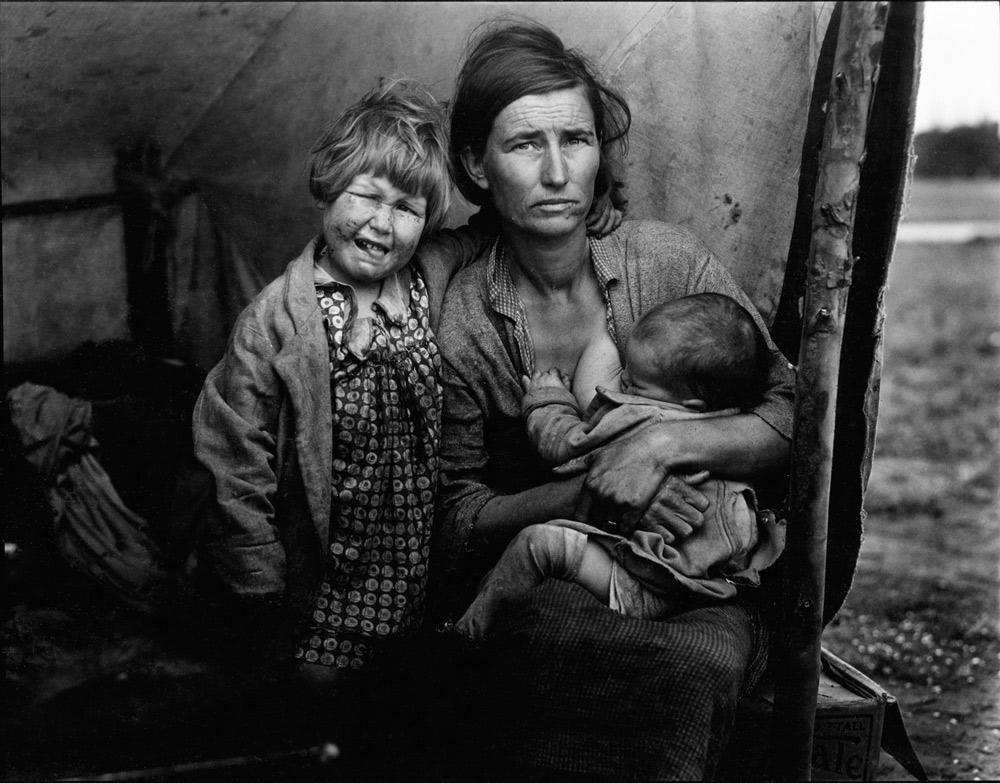
2b (not included by Lange in original sequence)

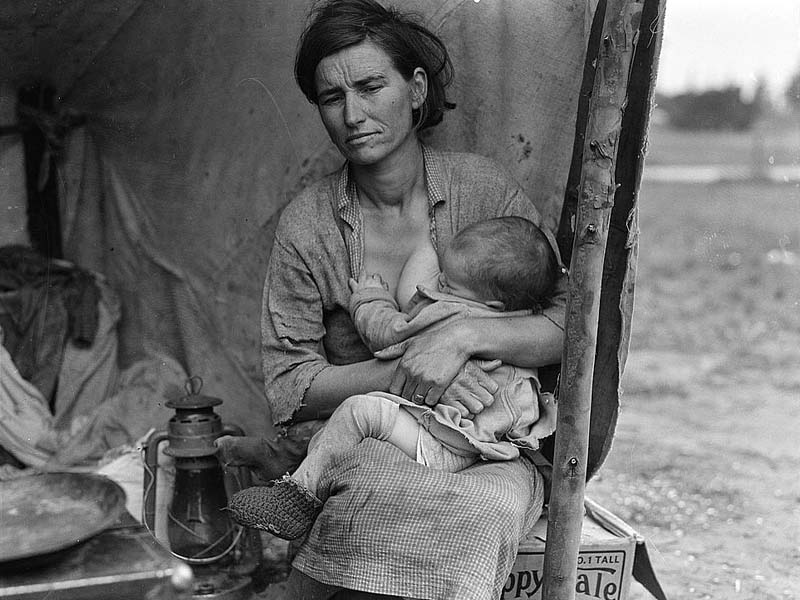
3

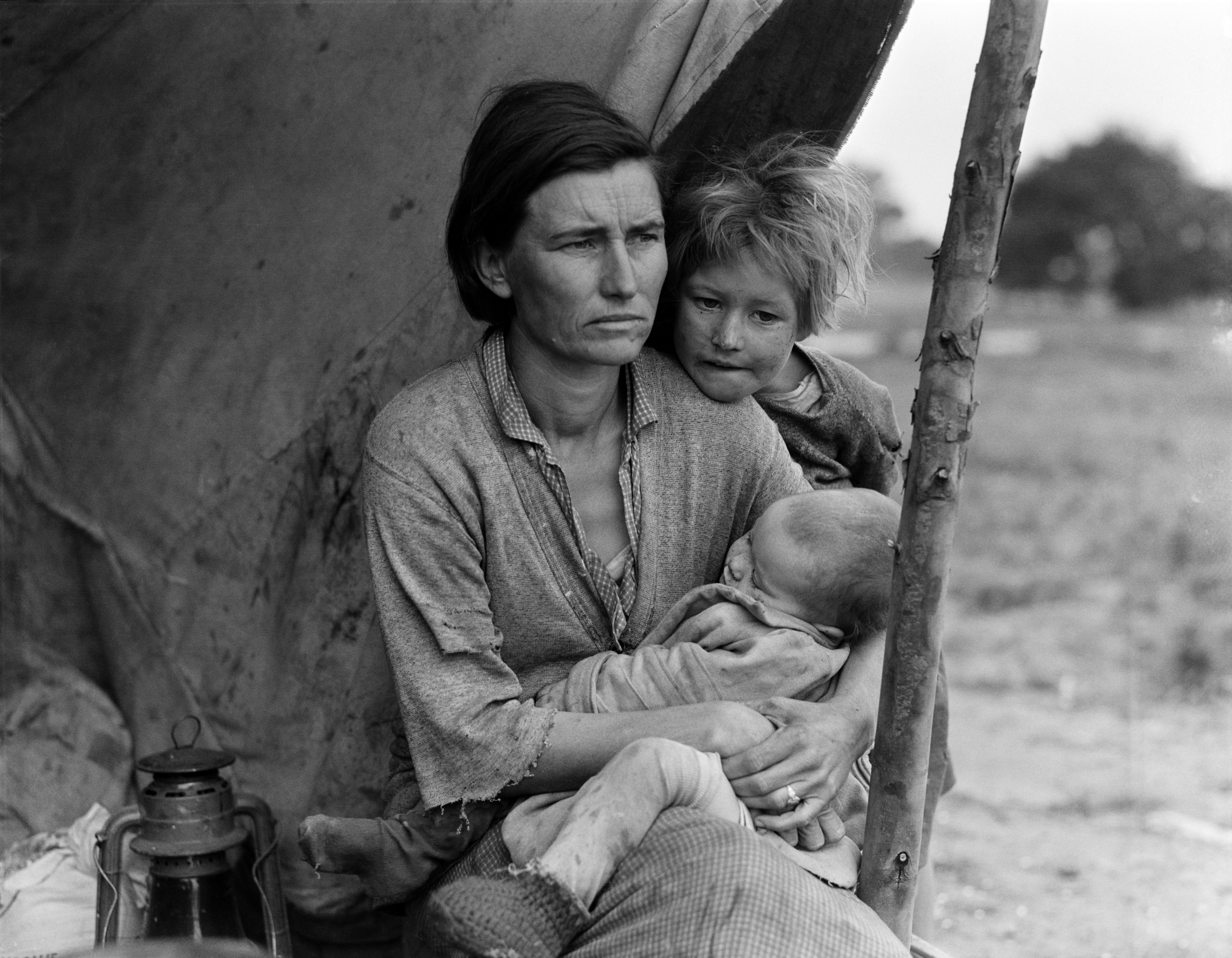
4

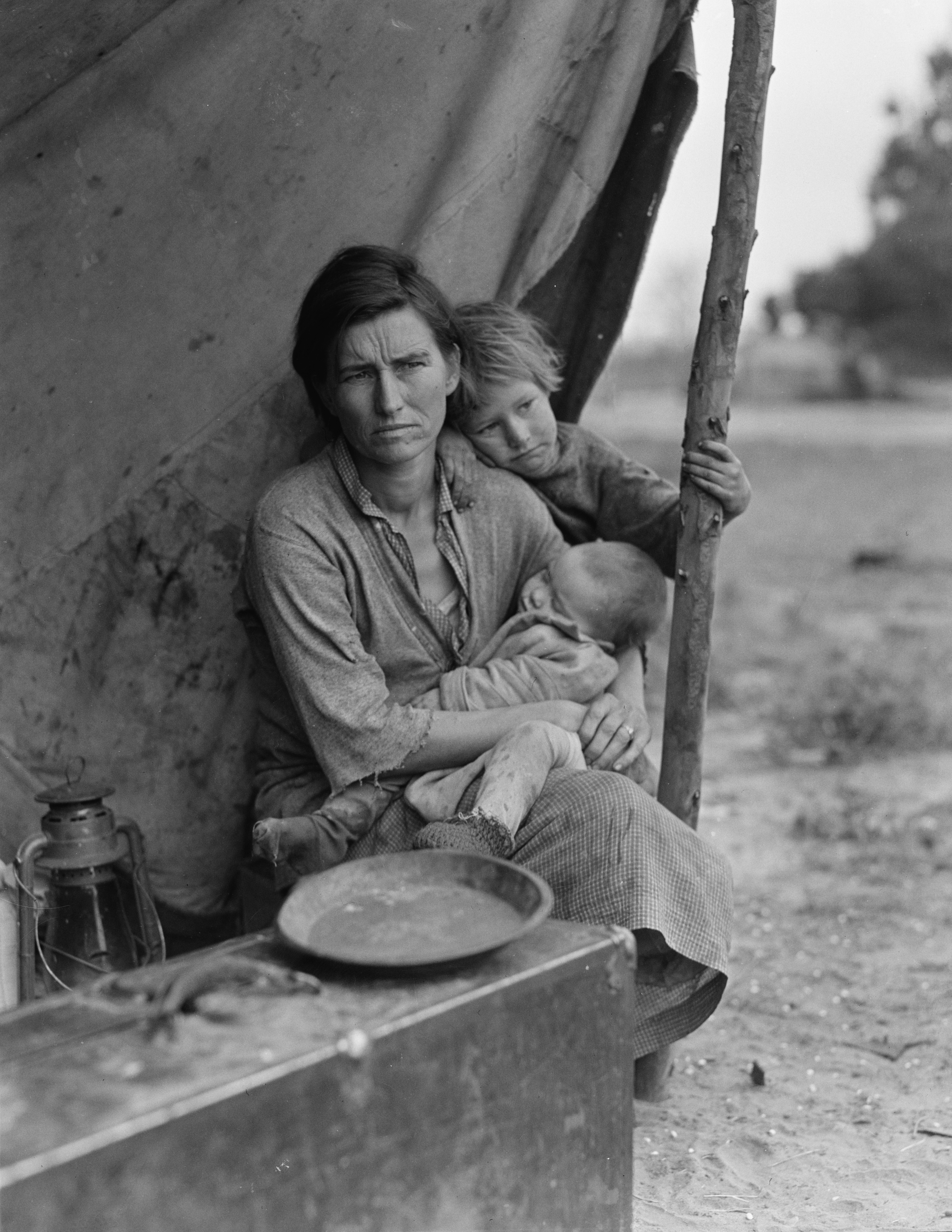
5

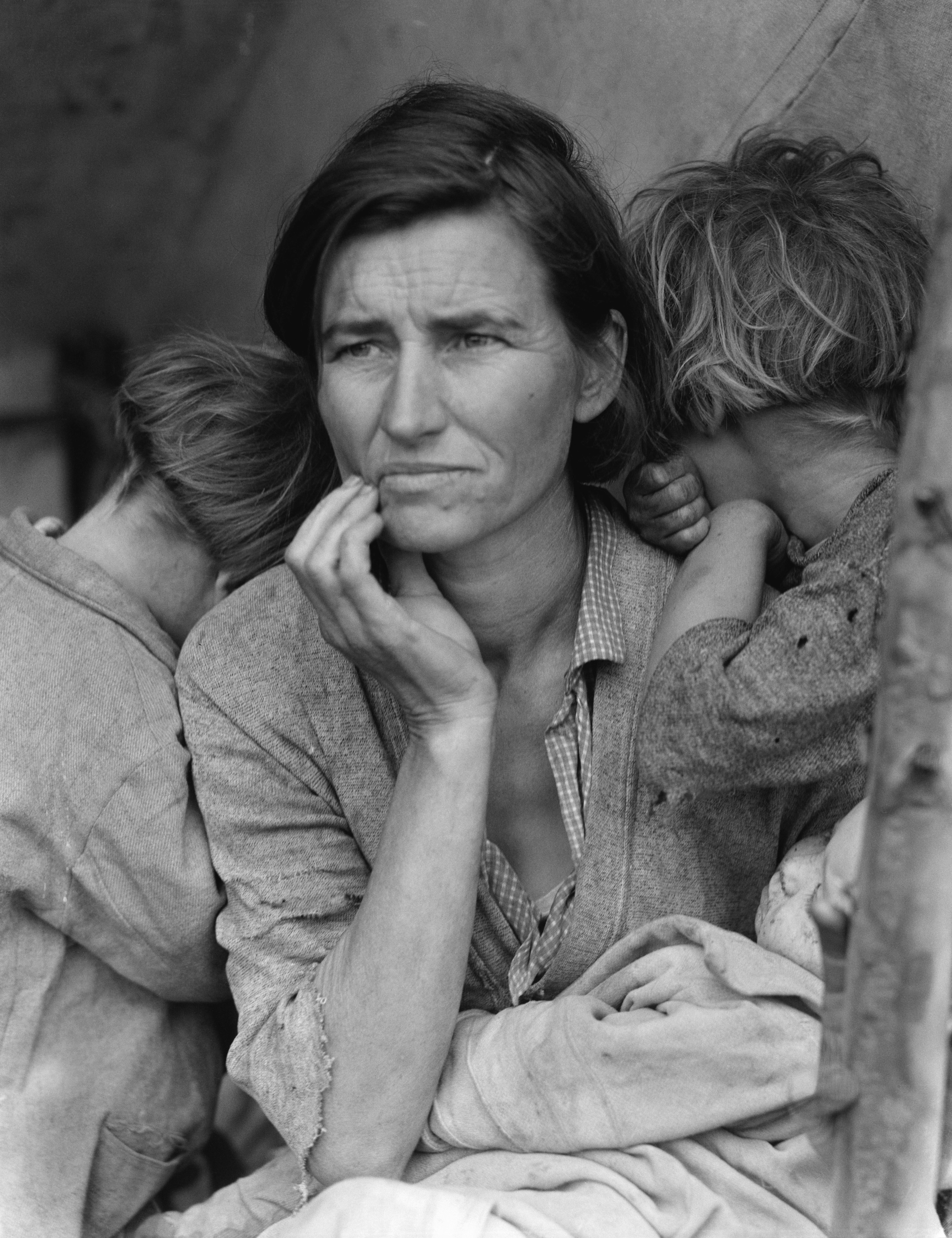
6

== Identity of family ==
The subjects of Lange's photography were always nameless. Roy Stryker, a manager of the FSA's photographic project, had his photographers practice contemporary social science techniques in captioning their images. This allowed the subjects to be viewed as common men and women under unfortunate circumstances that the Roosevelt administration was trying to improve. Several decades after the photograph's publication, a journalist found the identity of the iconic photograph's mother – Florence Owens Thompson – discovering that she was born in 1903 on a Cherokee reservation in Oklahoma. She married at the age of seventeen and had six children until her husband died in 1931. In 1933, she became pregnant again. Fearing that welfare authorities would take her child away, she moved back to Oklahoma. In 1934, her whole family moved out to Shafter, California where she worked in fields and began a relationship with James Hill. She had four more children with him. When Lange met Thompson, Hill and Thompson's sons were out looking to get their car fixed. In 1958, 22 years after the photograph had been published, Thompson saw Migrant Mother in a magazine and wrote to the magazine asking them to recall all unsold magazines to protect her and her family's rights. As the photograph was the creation of an employee of the federal government working in her official capacity, it belonged to the public domain and its publication was far beyond the reach of Lange's control. Once Thompson and her family came to know this, they withdrew their complaint and now speak positively about Lange.

== Interpretation and legacy ==
Migrant Mother's furrowed brow and hand placement suggests anxiety and worry about her duties as a mother to nurture and protect her children. Her expression and juxtaposition with her children and clothing indicates that the family is overcome by circumstances they cannot control, thus removing any blame from the mother. The children leaning on their mother depicts the mother as the children's pillar of strength. The absence of any space between the mother and children implies that the family have become one flesh in their suffering. In fact, photography scholar Sally Stein writes that if the photograph depicted the mother without her children, the photograph would have much less power. She argues that because the children are so close to their mother that through this visual compression, the merged mother with her children represents a sort of bondage. As a mother herself and a photographer of the working-class people, Lange was aware of this imprisonment and shared the complex anxiety felt by the mother. In addition to the presence of children, Stein argued that due to these implications and lack of resolution, Migrant Mother held a sort of inner tension that added to its power.

The process in which Lange obtained Migrant Mother revealed key insights into the prevailing social norms at the time and reflects key aspects in Lange's life. By 1936, Lange was married to a new man and was much happier in this marriage than her previous one. She felt like she was starting a new chapter in her life and felt more in control. Lange's process reflects this new chapter in her life. James Curtis, a scholar of FSA photography, writes, "The Migrant Mother series reflects Lange's new mood... Lange moved confidently in arranging her compositions. She knew the image she wanted, knew what to feature and what to leave out". Lange and her colleagues worked very hard to convey their subjects with dignity such that their plight would receive sympathy rather than ridicule. Her transition from photograph to photograph in the Migrant Mother series reveals this as she chooses to remove and alter key aspects of the frame in order to achieve a certain aesthetic. For example, she chooses to remove the teenager altogether from the final photographs to remove the questions such as, "Was she [the mother] a teenager herself when she gave birth to her first child?". Curtis writes, "While middle-class viewers were sympathetically disposed to the needs of impoverished children, teenagers posed thorny questions of personal responsibility".

Since its publication, Migrant Mother has become an icon of the Great Depression. The photograph has always been in the public domain and since its creation it has been reproduced many times including as postage stamps, as advertisements, for charity fundraising, and as magazine covers. The Black Panthers even put an afro on the mother. However, the legacy of Migrant Mother extended further than just to media. In the summer of 1983, the photograph was published in the national press. Florence Thompson was ill with cancer at the time, but had no insurance to help pay the costs. Her children pleaded for money to help with the costs and within weeks, they were able to raise $30,000 for their dying mother. Thompson eventually succumbed to her illness and passed in mid-September. Although most people will likely not know who Dorothea Lange is nor will they know the identity of the Migrant Mother, many recognize the mother's face as an emblem of the Great Depression.

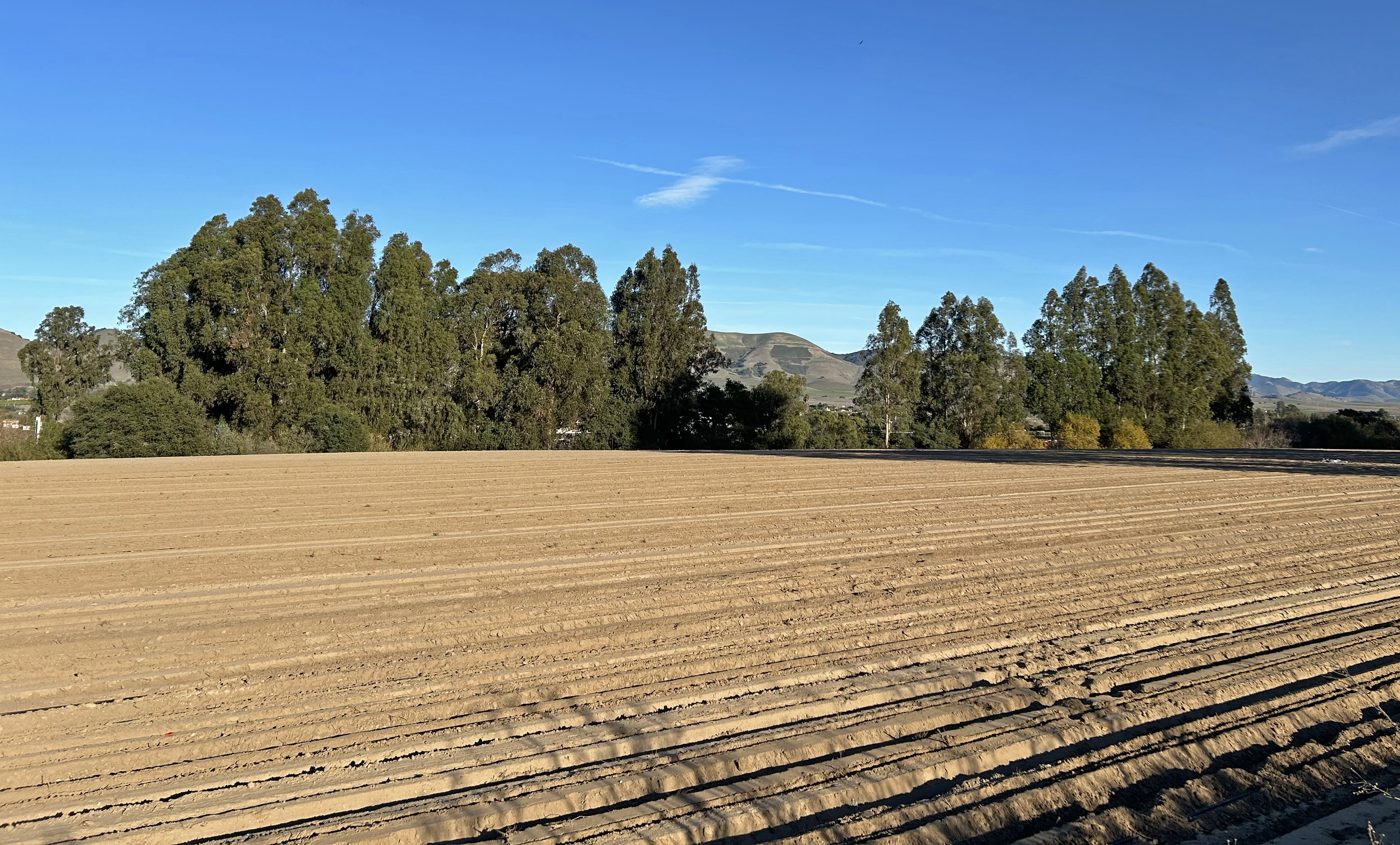
Pictured in January 2025, researchers have determined Dorothea Lange's Migrant Mother photo series location to have been on the outskirts of present-day Nipomo, beside the modern stretch of U.S. Highway 101.

=== Location research and locally planned commemoration ===
In the 2010s, pinpointing the precise location of the photograph became the subject of much research and scholarship in Nipomo, as nearly 40 historians, photographers, authors, and local residents attempted to find the exact area.

According to Paul Martin Lester, a professor at UT Dallas who led a campaign to fundraise for a commemorative historical marker, and author Doug Jenzen, the series of photos is believed to have taken place next to what is today known as North Oakglen Avenue in Nipomo. As of the mid-2020s, the site was still a crop field, bordered by the same eucalyptus trees, between the northbound side of U.S. Highway 101 to the south and the outskirts of Nipomo High's football stadium to the north.

== See also ==
- List of photographs considered the most important
