= Florence Owens Thompson =

American farm worker, subject of Dorothea Lange's photo 'Migrant Mother' (1903–1983)

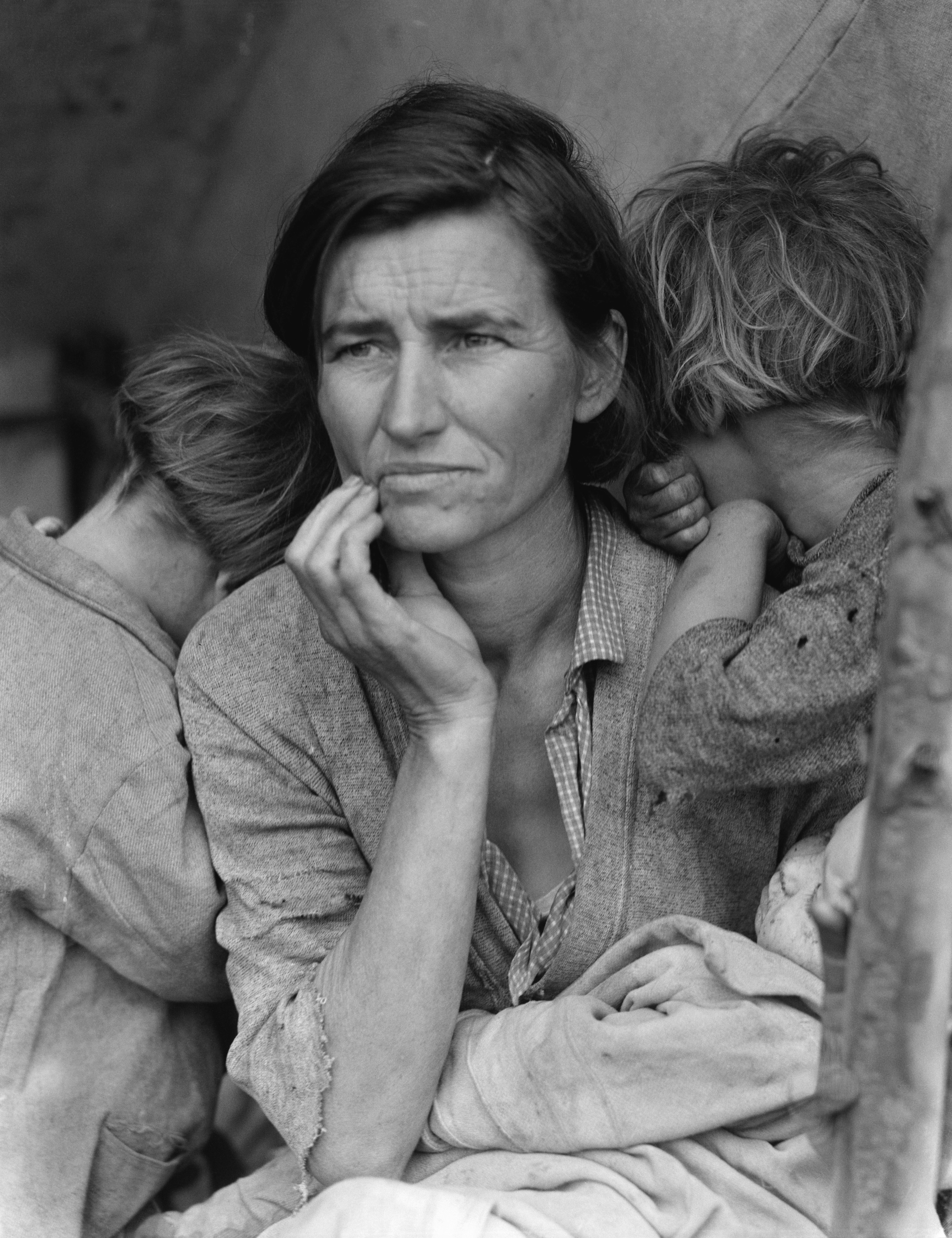
- Migrant Mother, taken by Dorothea Lange in 1936
- Born: Florence Leona Christie; September 1, 1903; Indian Territory (present-day Oklahoma)
- Died: September 16, 1983 (aged 80); Scotts Valley, California, U.S.
- Resting place: Lakewood Memorial Park, Hughson, California
- Citizenship: American
- Occupation: Agricultural laborer
- Known for: Dorothea Lange's photograph
- Spouse(s): Cleo Owens (1921–1931; his death); George B. Thompson (1952–1974)
- Partner: Jim Hill (1933–after 1945)
- Children: 10 (6 by Owens, 1 by another man, 3 by Hill)

Florence Owens Thompson (born Florence Leona Christie; September 1, 1903 – September 16, 1983) was an American woman who was the subject of Dorothea Lange's photograph Migrant Mother (1936), considered an iconic image of the Great Depression. The Library of Congress titled the image: "Destitute pea pickers in California. Mother of seven children. Age thirty-two. Nipomo, California." Thompson was called the "Mona Lisa of the 1930s."

== Biography ==
Florence Owens Thompson was born Florence Leona Christie on September 1, 1903, in Indian Territory, present-day Oklahoma. Both of her parents claimed Cherokee descent. Her father, Jackson Christie, allegedly abandoned her mother, Mary Jane Cobb, before she was born, and her mother married Charles Akman (of Choctaw descent) in the spring of 1905. The family lived on a small farm in Indian Territory outside Tahlequah. Cherokee Nation tribal records indicate that Jackson Christie's blood quantum was either full blood or one-half. Mary Jane Cobb claimed she was Cherokee on her May 27, 1894, marriage record to Christie, but later testified under oath before the Dawes Commission that both of her parents were white. While many sources claim Christie abandoned Cobb, he disputed the allegation. Christie served three years in a federal penitentiary in Detroit, Michigan.

On February 14, 1921, at age 17, Thompson married Cleo Owens, a farmer's son from Stone County, Missouri, who was 23. Children soon followed: the first daughter, Violet, a second daughter, Viola, then a third child, son Leroy (Troy). The family migrated west with several Owens relatives to Oroville, California, where they worked in the farms and saw mills of the Sacramento Valley. Thompson was pregnant with her sixth child when her husband Cleo died of tuberculosis in 1931.

Thompson then worked in the fields and in restaurants to support her six children. In 1933, Thompson had another child, returned to Oklahoma for a time, and then was joined by her parents as they migrated to Shafter, California, north of Bakersfield. There, Thompson met Jim Hill, with whom she had three more children. During the 1930s, the family worked as migrant farm workers following the crops in California and at times into Arizona. Thompson later recalled periods when she picked 400–500 pounds (180–230 kg) of cotton from first daylight until after it was too dark to work. She said: "I worked in hospitals. I tended bar. I cooked. I worked in the fields. I done a little bit of everything to make a living for my kids."

The family settled in Modesto, California, in 1945. Well after World War II, Thompson met and married hospital administrator George Thompson. This marriage brought her far greater financial security than she had previously enjoyed.

== Migrant Mother ==
On March 6, 1936, after picking beets in the Imperial Valley, Thompson and her family were traveling on U.S. Highway 101 towards Watsonville "where they had hoped to find work in the lettuce fields of the Pajaro Valley." On the road, the car's timing chain snapped and they coasted to a stop just inside a pea-pickers' camp on Nipomo Mesa. They were shocked to find so many people camping there—as many as 2,500 to 3,500. A notice had been sent out for pickers, but the crops had been destroyed by freezing rain, leaving them without work or pay. Years later, Thompson told an interviewer that when she cooked food for her children that day, other children appeared from the pea pickers' camp asking, "Can I have a bite?"

While Jim Hill, her partner, and two of Thompson's sons went into town to get parts to repair the car, Thompson and some of the children set up a temporary camp. As she waited, photographer Dorothea Lange, working for the Resettlement Administration, drove up and started taking photos of Thompson and her family. She took seven images in the course of ten minutes.

Lange's field notes for the Resettlement Administration were typically very thorough, but on this particular day she had been rushing to get home after a month on assignment, and the notes she submitted with this batch of negatives do not refer to any of the seven photographs she took of Thompson and her family. It seems that the published newspaper reports about this camp were later distilled into captions for the series, which explains inaccuracies on the file cards in the Library of Congress. For example, one of the file cards reads:

Destitute peapickers in California; a 32 year old mother of seven children. February [sic: March] 1936.

Twenty-three years later, Lange wrote of the encounter with Thompson:

I did not ask her name or her history. She told me her age, that she was 32. She said that they had been living on frozen vegetables from the surrounding fields and birds that the children killed. She had just sold the tires from her car to buy food.

Troy Owens, one of Thompson's sons, recounted:

There's no way we sold our tires, because we didn't have any to sell. The only ones we had were on the Hudson and we drove off in them. I don't believe Dorothea Lange was lying; I just think she had one story mixed up with another. Or she was borrowing to fill in what she didn't have.

In many ways, Migrant Mother is not typical of Lange's careful method of interacting with her subject. Exhausted after a long road-trip, she did not speak extensively to the migrant woman, or Thompson herself, and may not have recorded any notes.

According to Thompson, Lange promised the photos would never be published. Lange, however, sent them to the San Francisco News before even sending them to the Resettlement Administration in Washington, D.C. The San Francisco News ran the pictures almost immediately and reported that 2,500 to 3,500 migrant workers were starving in Nipomo, California. Within days, the pea-picker camp received 20,000 pounds (9,100 kg) of food from the federal government. Thompson and her family had moved on by the time the food arrived, and were working near Watsonville, California.

While Thompson's identity was not known for over 40 years after the photos were taken, the photos became famous. The image which later became known as Migrant Mother "achieved near mythical status, symbolizing, if not defining, an entire era in United States history". Roy Stryker called Migrant Mother the "ultimate" photo of the Depression Era: "[Lange] never surpassed it. To me, it was the picture ... . The others were marvelous, but that was special ... . She is immortal." As a whole, the photographs taken for the Resettlement Administration "have been widely heralded as the epitome of documentary photography." Edward Steichen described them as "the most remarkable human documents ever rendered in pictures."

Thompson's identity was discovered in the late 1970s. In 1978, acting on a tip, Modesto Bee reporter Emmett Corrigan located Thompson at her mobile home in Space 24 of the Modesto Mobile Village and recognized her from the photograph. Thompson was quoted as saying: "I wish she [Lange] hadn't taken my picture. I can't get a penny out of it. She didn't ask my name. She said she wouldn't sell the pictures. She said she'd send me a copy. She never did." Having been funded by the Resettlement Administration, the picture was classed as a federal government work and thus public domain, so that Lange was not entitled to royalties. However, the picture did help make her a celebrity and earned her "respect from her colleagues."

While the image was being prepared for exhibit in 1938, the negative of the photo was retouched to remove Florence's thumb from the lower-right corner of the image.

=== Circulation ===
In the late 1960s, Bill Hendrie found unretouched prints by Lange of Migrant Mother and 31 other images from the same series in a dumpster at the San Jose Chamber of Commerce. After the death of Hendrie and his wife, their daughter, Marian Tankersley, rediscovered the photos while emptying her parents' San Jose home. In October 2005, an anonymous buyer paid $296,000 at Sotheby's New York for the set—nearly six times their pre-bid estimate.

In 1998, the retouched photo of Migrant Mother became a 32-cent U.S. Postal Service stamp in the 1930s portion of the Celebrate the Century series. The stamp printing was unusual: daughters Katherine McIntosh (on the left in the stamp) and Norma Rydlewski (in Thompson's arms in the stamp) were alive at the time of the printing; usually, the Postal Service does not print stamps of individuals who have not been dead for at least 10 years.

In the same month the U.S. stamp was issued, a print of the photograph with Lange's handwritten notes and signature sold in 1998 for $244,500 at Sotheby's New York. In November 2002, Dorothea Lange's personal print of Migrant Mother sold at Christie's New York for $141,500.

== Later life, death, and aftermath ==
Thompson (seated) with three of her daughters (from L. to R.), Katherine, Ruby and Norma, in 1979; 43 years after Migrant Mother

Thompson's children bought her a house in Modesto, California, in the 1970s, but she preferred living in a mobile home and moved back into one.

Thompson was hospitalized and her family appealed for financial help in late August 1983. By September, the family had collected $35,000 in donations to pay for her medical care. Thompson died of "stroke, cancer and heart problems" at Scotts Valley, California, on September 16, 1983, at age 80. She was buried in Lakewood Memorial Park, in Hughson, California, and her gravestone reads: "FLORENCE LEONA THOMPSON Migrant Mother – A Legend of the Strength of American Motherhood."

In a 2008 interview with CNN, one of Thompson's daughters, Katherine McIntosh, recalled her mother as a "very strong lady", and "the backbone of our family". She said: "We never had a lot, but she always made sure we had something. She didn't eat sometimes, but she made sure us children ate. That's one thing she did do." A son, Troy Owens, said that more than 2,000 letters received along with donations for his mother's medical fund led to a re-appraisal of the photo: "For Mama and us, the photo had always been a bit of [a] curse. After all those letters came in, I think it gave us a sense of pride."

== Other six photographs ==
Lange took seven photos that day, the last being Migrant Mother. The following are the other six photos:

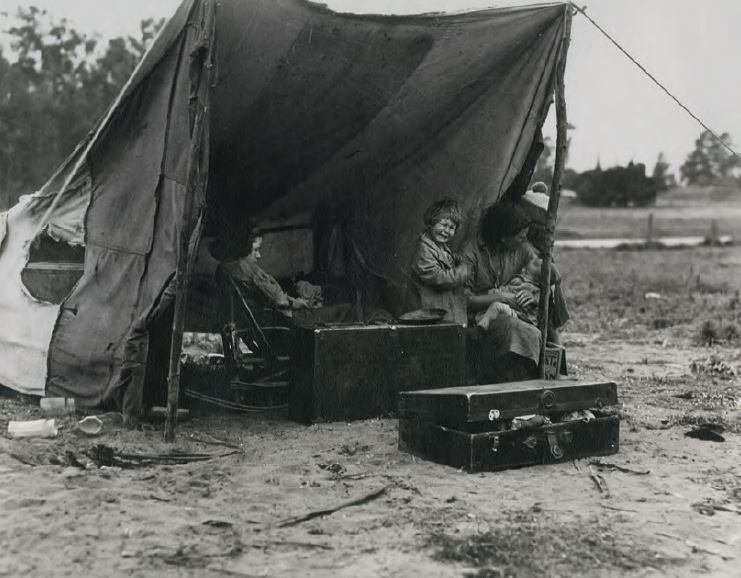
Collection of the Oakland Museum of California

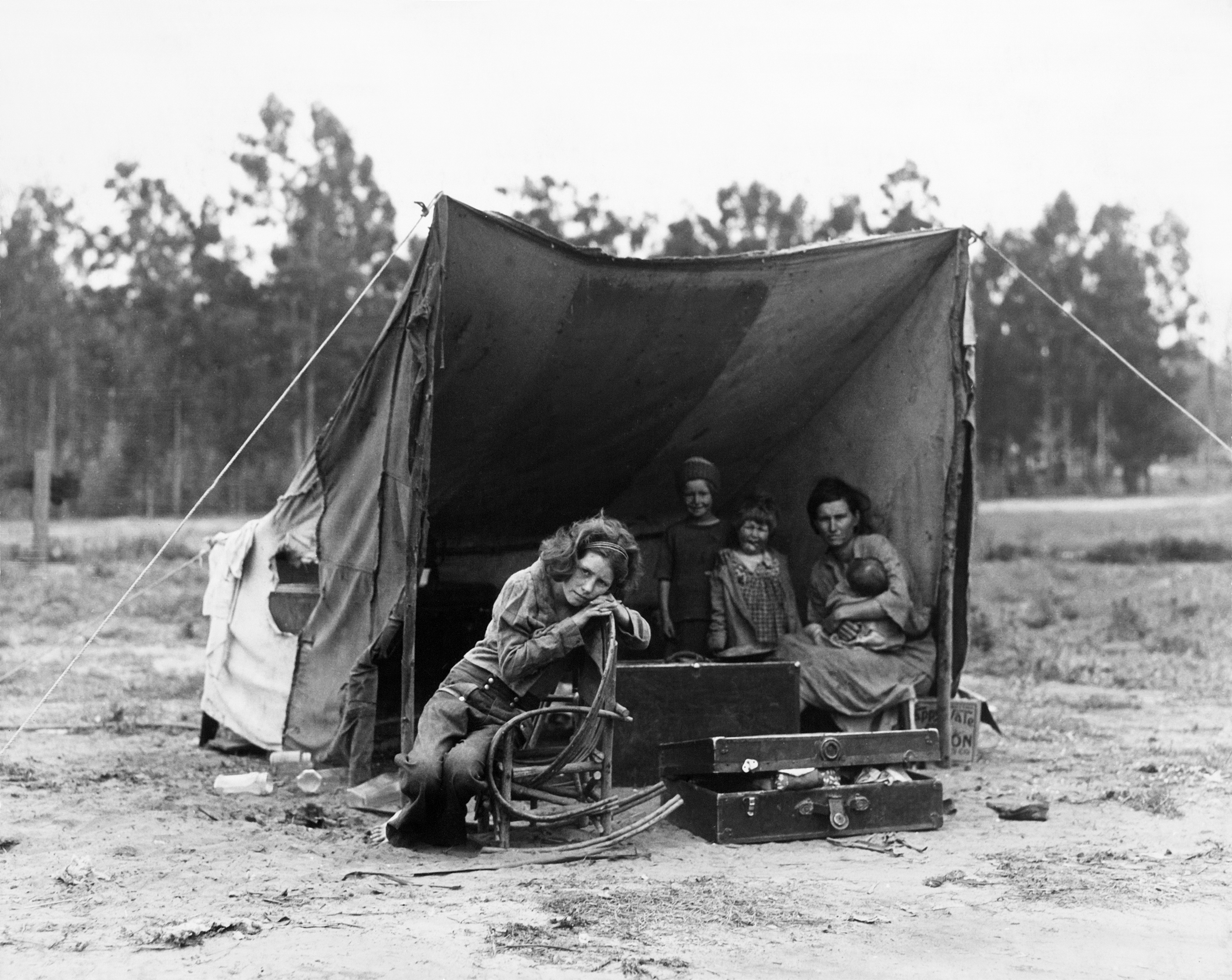
Farm Security Administration–Office of War Information Photograph Collection, Library of Congress

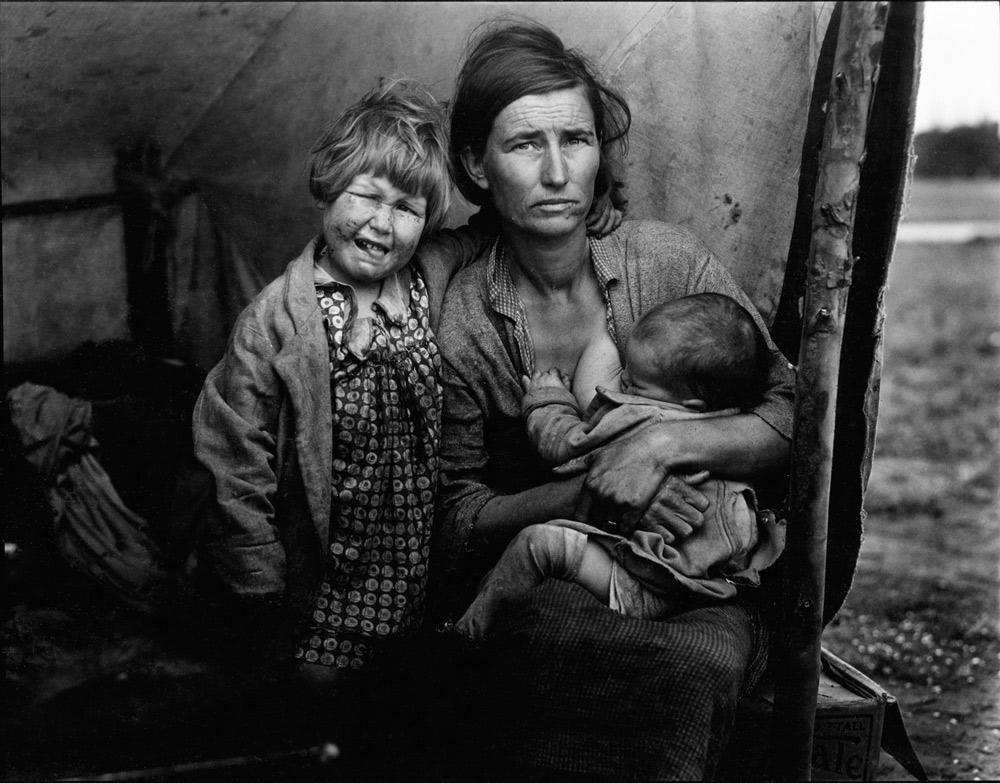
Collection of the Oakland Museum of California

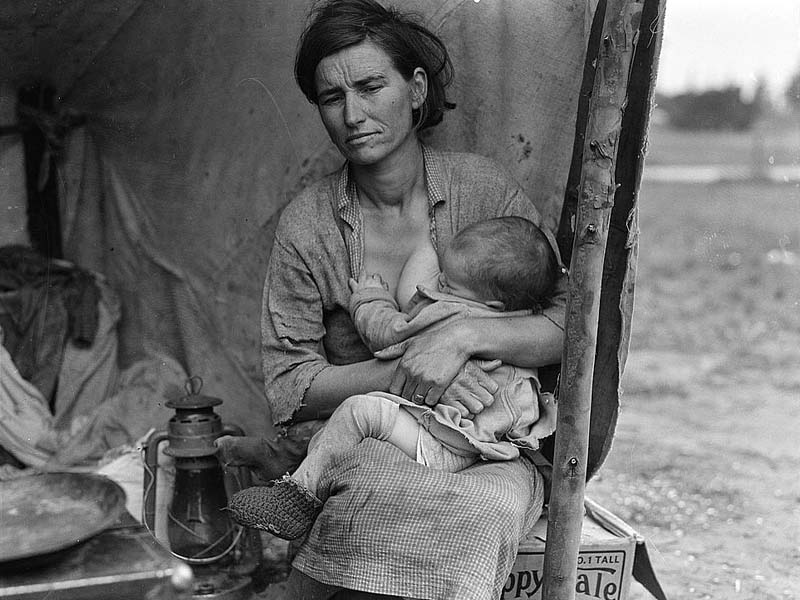
Farm Security Administration–Office of War Information Photograph Collection, Library of Congress

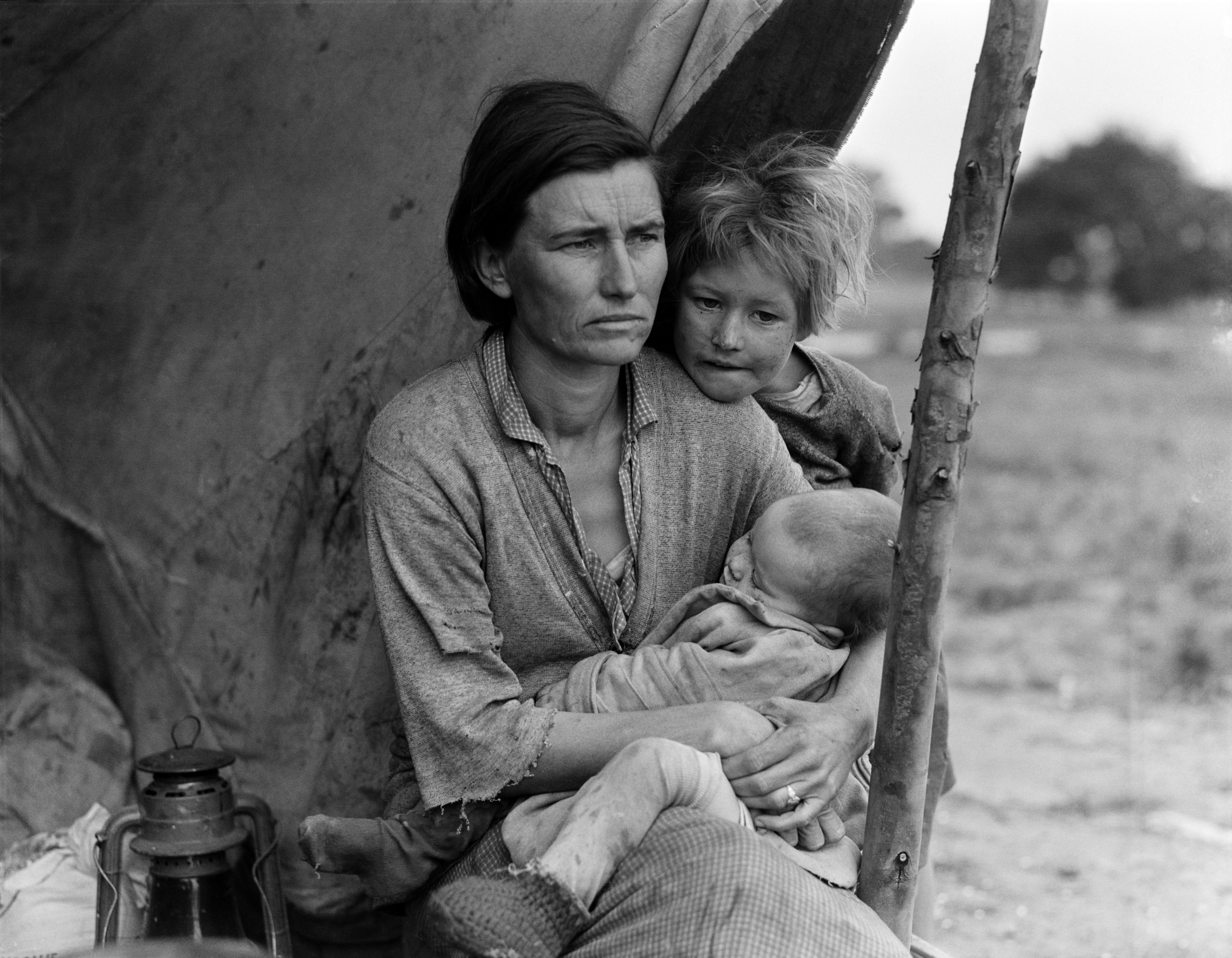
Farm Security Administration–Office of War Information Photograph Collection, Library of Congress

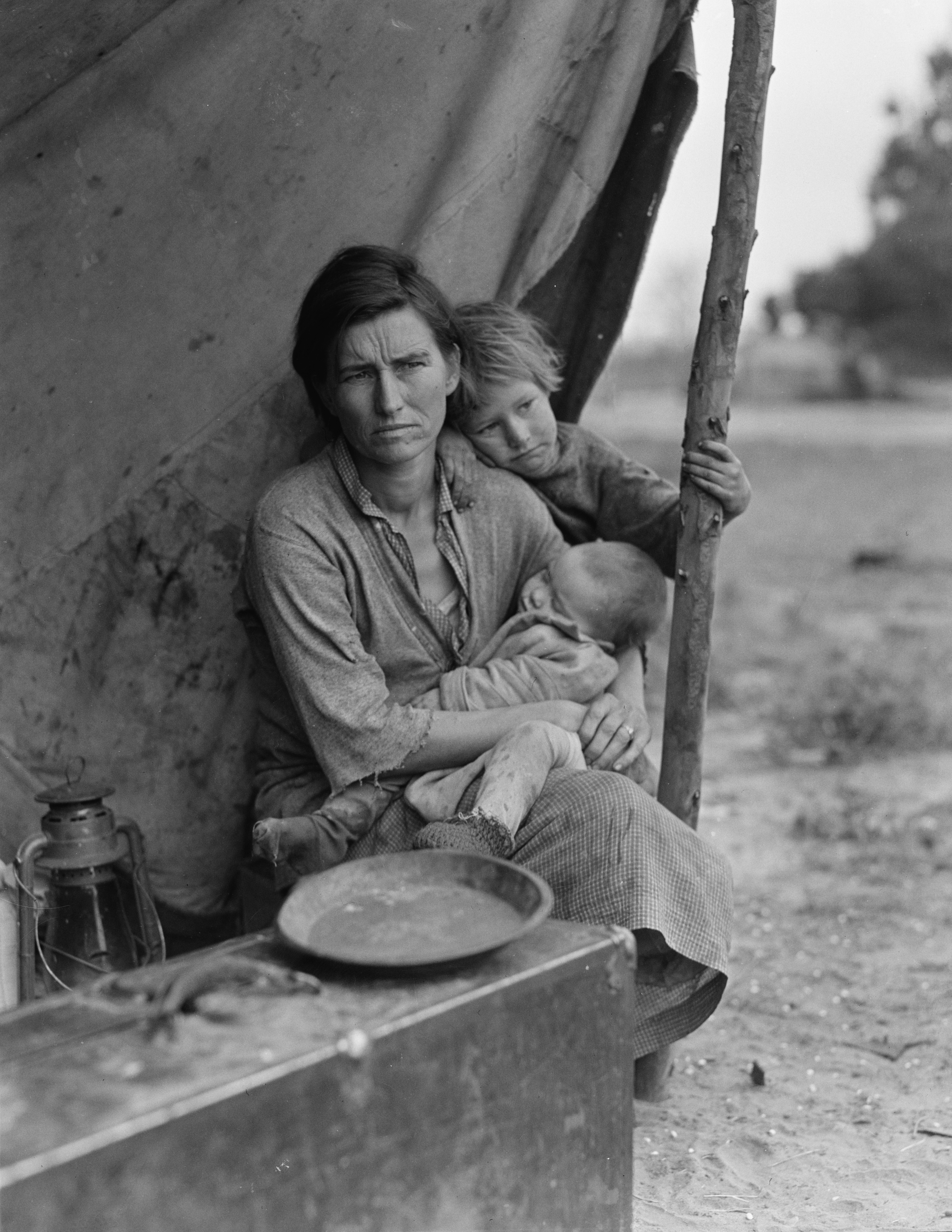
Farm Security Administration–Office of War Information Photograph Collection, Library of Congress
