= Maria Pepe =

American little league player (born 1960)

Maria Pepe (born 1960) was one of the first girls to play Little League Baseball after Little League officially banned girls from participating in 1951.

In 1972, at age 12, she pitched three Little League games for the Young Democrats team in Hoboken, New Jersey. This was the same team which her friends from the neighborhood had joined, so she joined as well, after having been invited to play by Little League coach Jim Farina. Pepe was asked to leave the team after the Little League "threatened to revoke Hoboken's charter." The refusal to allow Pepe to play attracted the attention of the National Organization for Women (NOW).

A court case began on Pepe's behalf, which was supported by NOW. Ultimately, in 1974, the New Jersey Superior Court decided that Little League Baseball must allow girls to play.

Pepe became a minor celebrity and drew media attention to various women's causes at the time.

== Recognition ==
The New York Yankees made Pepe an honorary "Yankee for a day".

In 2004, she lent her glove and hat to the Peter J. McGovern Little League Museum in South Williamsport, Pennsylvania.

On August 20, 2004, she was honored by Little League Baseball by being asked to throw out the ceremonial first pitch at the 2004 Little League World Series in South Williamsport.

In 2005 she attended a ceremony for Little League perfect game pitcher Kathleen Brownell who was being honored at the National Baseball Hall of Fame and Museum in Cooperstown, New York.

In October 2018, Pepe's hometown of Hoboken, New Jersey, included her in a mural also honoring Dorothea Lange and Dorothy McNeil, who were also born there.

In 2024, she was inducted into the Little League Hall of Excellence.

The Maria Pepe Little League Baseball Legacy Series was played for the first time in 2024.
