= Peter J. McGovern Little League Museum =

- Museum's icon from the website, reminiscent of the building's main sign

- Location of the Hall of Fame and Museum in Pennsylvania
- Established: 1982
- Location: 539 US Route 15 Highway, South Williamsport, Pennsylvania, U.S.
- Coordinates: 41.2288°N 76.9808°W
- Type: Sports museum, Hall of fame
- Website: Official Website

The Peter J. McGovern Little League Museum, also called The World of Little League Museum, is located on the Little League International Complex on Route 15 in South Williamsport, Pennsylvania, United States. The museum offers interactive exhibits for children of all ages. In addition, patrons can learn about the history of Little League Baseball.

The museum chronicles the growth of Little League from one, three-team league in 1939 to the multi-national youth sporting organization that it is today. Howard J. Lamade Stadium and Little League Volunteer Stadium are located directly behind the museum.

== Hall of Excellence ==
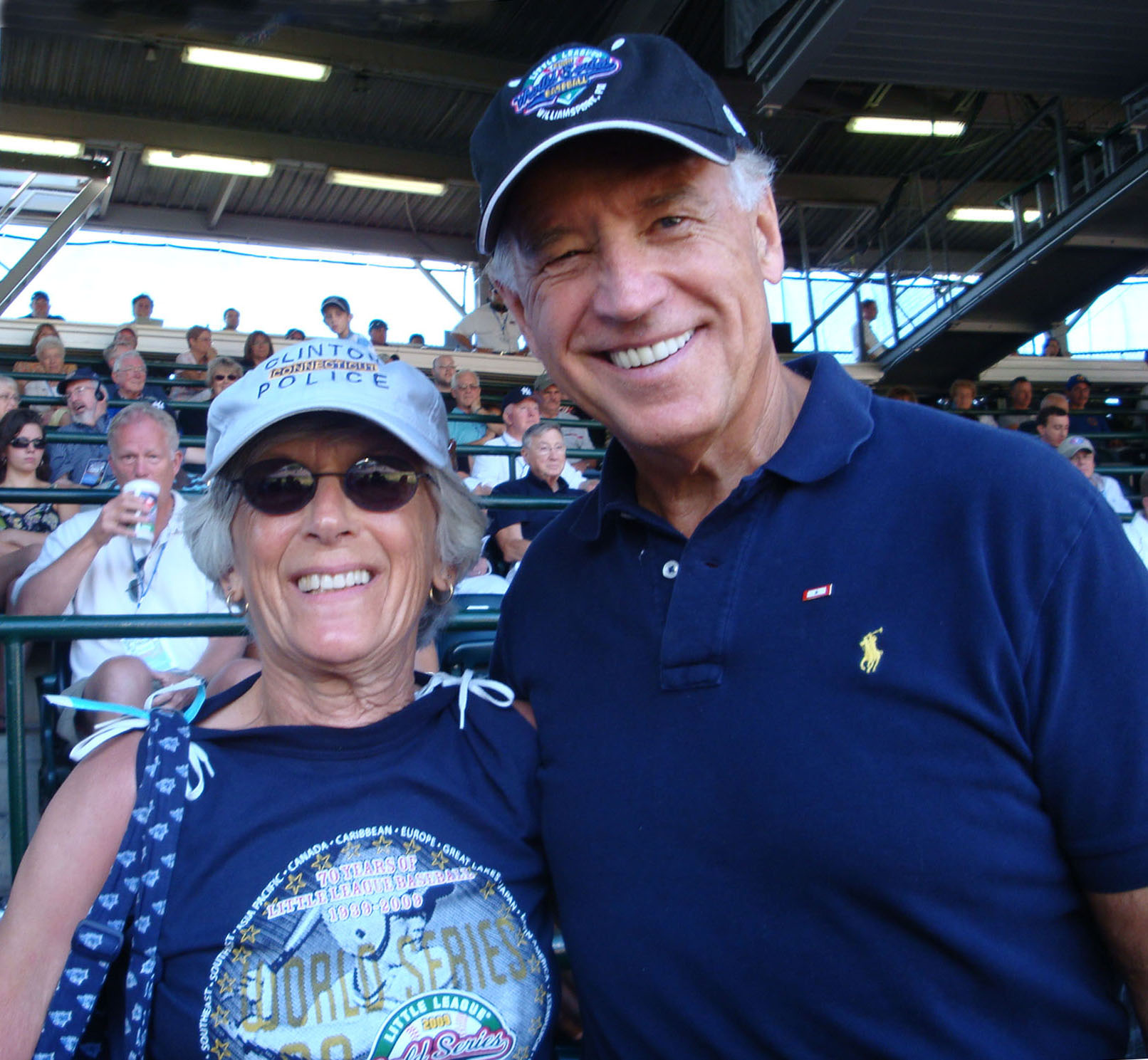
Vice President Joe Biden at the 2009 Little League World Series

The museum maintains a Hall of Excellence, established in 1998, to honor former Little League players who "have demonstrated a commitment to excellence in their chosen profession and exemplify the values learned as children in Little League."

Year	Name	Profession or area known for
1988	Tom Seaver	MLB
1989	Bill Bradley	Politics, United States Senate, NBA
1990	Dan Quayle	Politics, Vice President of the United States
1991	Nolan Ryan	MLB
1991	Mike Schmidt	MLB
1991	Tom Selleck	Acting
1992	Kareem Abdul-Jabbar	NBA
1992	George Will	Politics, commentary
1993	Hale Irwin	Golf
1994	Vincent Fortanasce	Medicine & author
1994	Story Musgrave	Astronaut
1994	Jim Palmer	MLB
1995	Dale Murphy	MLB
1996	Leonard S. Coleman Jr.	MLB, President of the National League
1996	Robert B. Sloan	Theology
1996	Cal Ripken Jr.	MLB
1997	Dan O'Brien	Olympic Games
1997	Bruce Springsteen	Musician
1998	Dave Barry	Humorist
1998	Tony Dungy	NFL
1999	Don Beaver	Minor League Baseball owner
1999	Michael Pladus	Education
1999	Brian Sipe	NFL
2000	Kevin Costner	Acting
2000	Billy Hunter	NFL player & NBA executive
2000	Robert Stratta	Medicine
2001	George W. Bush	Politics, President of the United States
2002	Rudolph Giuliani	Politics, Mayor of New York City
2002	Michael Cammarata	New York City Fire Department
2003	Wilbert Davis	United States Army
2003	Peter Pace	United States Marine Corps
2004	Nancy dosReis	Law enforcement
2004	Cathy Gerring	Golf
2004	Krissy Wendell	Ice hockey
2005	José Maiz García	Construction executive (es:José Maiz García)
2006	Lloyd McClendon	MLB
2007	Dusty Baker	MLB
2007	Pierre Turgeon	NHL
2008	Ozzie Newsome	NFL
2008	Chris Drury	NHL
2008	Joe Biden	Politics, Vice President of the United States, President of the United States
2010	Kyle Petty	NASCAR
2011	Ross A. McGinnis	United States Army, Medal of Honor
2012	Ron Ricks	Airline executive
2012	Dick Vitale	Sports commentator
2013	Chris Christie	Politics, Governor of New Jersey
2013	Harlan Coben	Author
2014	Mike Mussina	MLB
2015	Mariano Rivera	MLB
2016	Cat Osterman	Softball
2016	Torii Hunter	MLB
2016	Tom Coughlin	NFL coach
2017	Champ Pederson	Special Olympics athlete
2017	Sydney Leroux	Soccer
2017	Angel Macías	Little League Baseball in Mexico
2018	Rob Manfred	MLB, Commissioner of Baseball
2018	Thomas Tull	Film producer
2019	Heather Tarr	NCAA coach
2019	Austin Dillon	NASCAR
2022	Todd Frazier	MLB
2022	Jenny Dalton-Hill	NCAA softball player
2023	Stuart Scott	ESPN2
2024	Maria Pepe	Little League Baseball
2024	Meghan Duggan	USA Hockey player
2024	Ray Ferraro	NHL
2025	John W. Stanton	Businessman, Seattle Mariners owner

== See also ==
- Little League Baseball § Awards
