= Wheelers Primitive Baptist Church =

Coordinates: 36.26695°N 79.12126°W

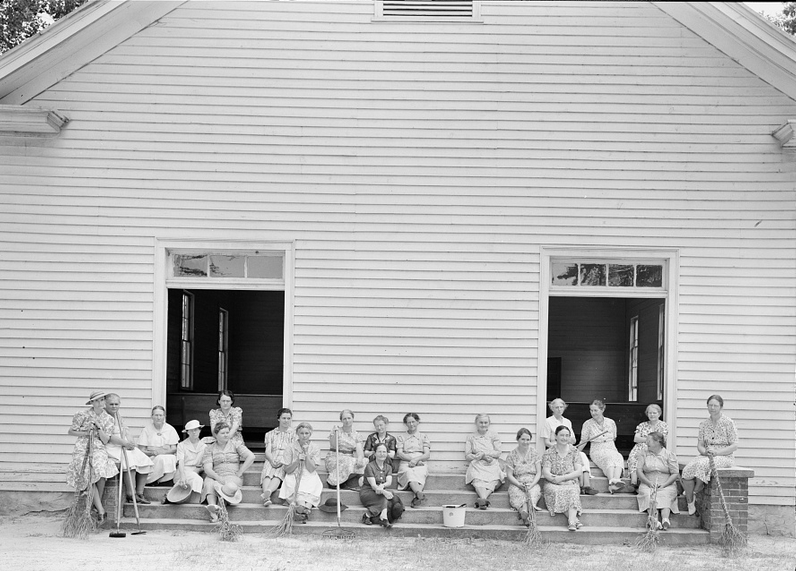
Annual clean-up, 1939

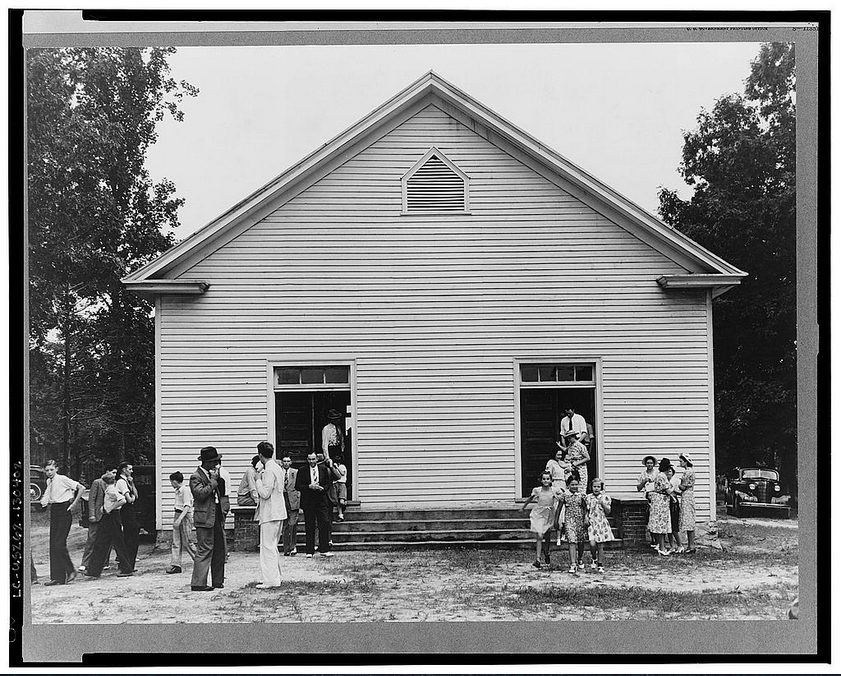
After services, 1939

Wheelers Primitive Baptist Church is located in southwest Person County, North Carolina. The church was formerly known as Wheeleys Meeting House (as well as once called Wheeley's Church and Upper South Hico Church). The church and its cemetery sit at a small rural crossroads about 1 mile south of North Carolina Highway 49. The church is known to locals simply as Wheelers and is located near Gordonton in Bushy Fork Township. The west northwestern part of the cemetery is the oldest and contains many unmarked graves.

The original baptist congregation was formed in 1755. In the early part of the 19th century, many Baptists sought to separate from the Calvinist aspect of their theologist that God predestined human beings to either heaven or hell. Others wanted reforms to have Sunday school, musical instruments and paid ministers. In 1832, the church passed a resolution rejecting the reforms and added 'primitive' to the church name.

Depression-era photographer Dorothea Lange photographed the church in early July 1939 as part of her project with the Farm Service Administration. Before any photos were taken, Lange had to receive the permission of the older members of the church. Because of hesitation of several members she did not photograph inside the church. She photographed the church on two occasions: the first was on Wednesday, July 5, 1939; she photographed the ladies cleaning the church property. The second was on Sunday, July 9, 1939, where she photographed the congregation as they departed church services. The men departed from the left door and the women on the right door. Lange's work provided a glimpse of religious life in the south in the late 1930s.

== See also ==
- Primitive Baptists
