= Lois Jordan =

Lois Jordan, The White Angel, created an outdoor soup kitchen at Pier 23 on San Francisco's Embarcadero, keeping it open for the final two years of Herbert Hoover's administration, which would not allocate federal government assistance to able bodied men.

== Early life ==
She was born in Australia in 1883. She immigrated to San Francisco in 1907. Census records report, she was naturalized in 1917.

== Serving ==
In 1928, she opened a café close to Seattle, Washington. One day a man found her passed out on the floor of the cafe. Admitted to a hospital, she had surgery. After she had a vision of Jesus. She claimed she had to go to San Francisco.

She wasn't sure how she should serve God. She fed the unemployed from her car.

== The Soup Kitchen ==
On January 12, 1931, she started serving food on a lot owned by Abe Ruef, convicted of graft after the San Francisco earthquake of 1906. He loaned her the empty lot on the Embarcadero opposite Pier 23 in San Francisco. Within a few days Lois Jordan, The White Angel, or Mother White Angel, had served 700 unemployed.

== Dorothea Lange ==
Dorothea Lange, photographer, walking in the area snapped the photo of an older man, wearing an old fedora turned away from the crowd of men, tin coffee cup in hand. The photo, named White Angel Jungle, became emblematic of the Great Depression.

In the first four months, Jordan reports serving over 111,000 meals. She went on to provide haircuts, shaves, clothing, medical care and even jobs.

But White Angel Jungle, as her soup kitchen was called was plagued by fraud, including that perpetrated by the city, She even wore a nurse's uniform, although not a nurse so the city would not close her down.

Jordan served over a million meals in the two years the soup kitchen thrived with donations of "Grub and Clothes" from the public. She even ran ads in The San Francisco Chronicle, stating that labor could be had for fifty cents an hour. The San Francisco Chronicle has 124 entries from March 1931 through 1933 when Lois Jordan closed the White Angel Jungle; she was a curiosity and source of entertainment for its readers.

== Fraud ==
Jordan wrote a book of her experience. Her book is a record of many types of schemes perpetrated during the Great Depression to bilk money out of the public or government coffers. On April 30, 1931 racketeers wanted to buy her out for $20,000, claiming they would reap $2 million in profit by soliciting donations by telephone solicitation. Jordan also claimed radicals wanted to take over White Angel Jungle to blackmail the government for funds (The San Francisco Chronicle 30 Apr 1931: 1).

== Soup Kitchen Closes ==
In 1933, Lois Jordan's soup kitchen, White Angel Jungle, closed as Roosevelt authorized federal government support to the men Lois served.

== Serving Continued ==
She bought a ranch in the East Bay, where she continued to grow food that she donated. The ranch housed some of those she helped. Later it was given to Dublin and dedicated as a park in 2018.

She returned to San Francisco where she started and ran the first community owned grocery store in Hunter's Point.

== Death ==
She died of congestive heart failure in General Hospital in 1949.
