= Dorothea Lange =

American photojournalist (1895–1965)

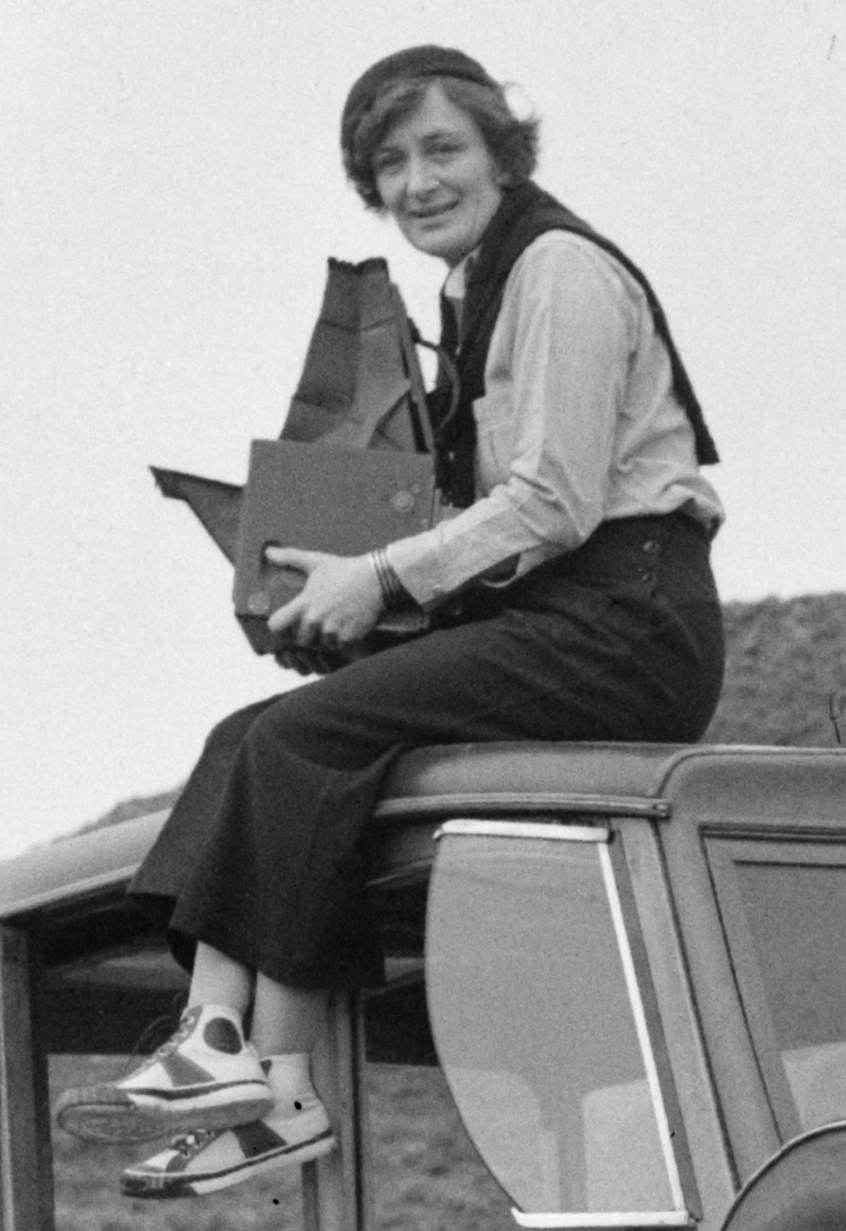
- Lange in 1936
- Born: Dorothea Margaretta Nutzhorn; May 26, 1895; Hoboken, New Jersey, U.S.
- Died: October 11, 1965 (aged 70); San Francisco, California, U.S.
- Known for: Documentary photography, photojournalism
- Notable work: 1936 photograph of Florence Owens Thompson, Migrant Mother
- Spouse: Maynard Dixon (m. 1920; div. 1935) Paul Schuster Taylor (m. 1935)
- Children: 2
- Awards: California Hall of Fame

Dorothea Lange (born Dorothea Margaretta Nutzhorn; May 26, 1895 – October 11, 1965) was an American documentary photographer and photojournalist, best known for her Depression-era work for the Farm Security Administration (FSA). Lange's photographs influenced the development of documentary photography and humanized the consequences of the Great Depression.

Lange expressed her photographic image interest as the "last ditch:" documenting the poor and dispossessed. Her Migrant Mother image taken in 1936 has become the defining image of the Dust Bowl and is on display at the Art Institute of Chicago. Lange taught fine art photography in her later years at California School of Fine Arts.

== Early life ==
Lange was born in Hoboken, New Jersey to second-generation German immigrants Johanna Lange and Heinrich Nutzhorn. She had a younger brother named Martin. Two early events shaped Lange's path as a photographer. First, at age seven she contracted polio, which left her with a weakened right leg and a permanent limp. "It formed me, guided me, instructed me, helped me, and humiliated me," Lange once said of her altered gait. "I've never gotten over it, and I am aware of the force and power of it." Second, five years later, her father abandoned the family, prompting a move from suburban New Jersey to a poorer neighborhood in New York City. Later she dropped her father's family name and took her mother's maiden name.

Growing up on Manhattan's Lower East Side, she attended PS 62 on Hester Street, where she was "one of the only gentiles—quite possibly the only—in a class of 3,000 Jews." "Left on her own while her mother worked, Lange wandered the streets of New York, fascinated by the variety of people she saw. She learned to observe without intruding, a skill she would later use as a documentary photographer."

== Career ==
Lange graduated from the Wadleigh High School for Girls, New York City; by this time, even though she had never owned or operated a camera, she had already decided that she would become a photographer. Lange began her study of photography at Columbia University under the tutelage of Clarence H. White, and later gained informal apprenticeships with several New York photography studios, including that of Arnold Genthe.

In 1918, Lange left New York with a female friend intending to travel the world, but her plans were disrupted upon being robbed. She settled in San Francisco where she found work as a 'finisher' in a photographic supply shop. There, Lange became acquainted with other photographers and met an investor who backed her in establishing a successful portrait studio. In 1920, she married the noted western painter Maynard Dixon, with whom she had two sons, Daniel, born in 1925, and John, born in 1930. Lange's studio business supported her family for the next fifteen years. Lange's early studio work mostly involved shooting portrait photographs of the social elite in San Francisco, but at the onset of the Great Depression, she turned her lens from the studio to the street.

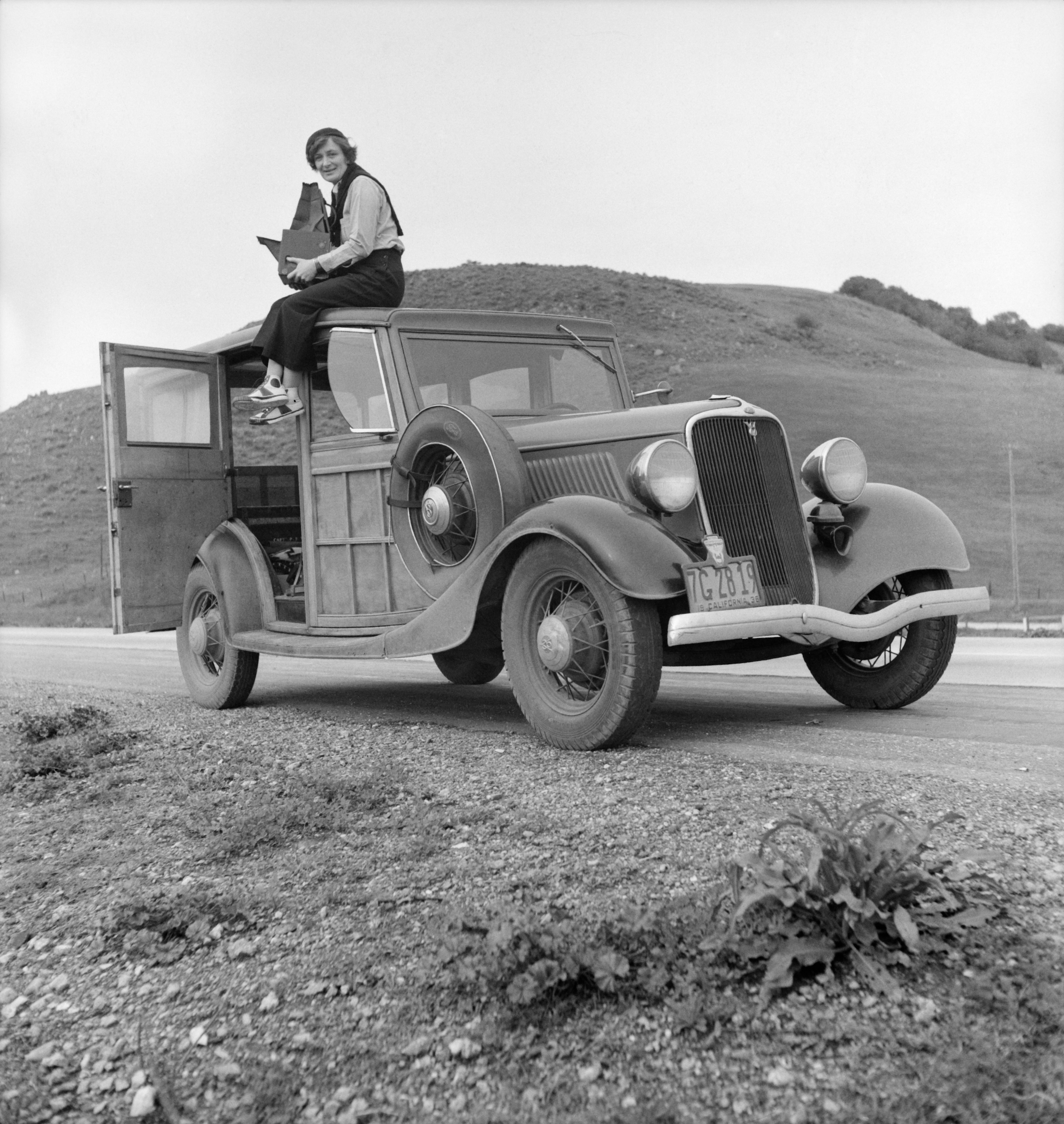
Lange in 1936 holding a Graflex 4×5 camera atop a Ford Model 40 in California, photographed by her assistant Rondal Partridge

=== Depression era ===
In the depths of the worldwide depression, in 1933, some fourteen million people in the U.S. were out of work, about 300,000 of which migrated to California looking for work. Many were homeless, drifting aimlessly, often without enough food to eat. In the midwest and southwest, drought and dust storms added to the economic havoc. Broadly, these migrant families were called by the opprobrium "Okies" (derived from Oklahoma) regardless of where they came from. They traveled in old, dilapidated cars or trucks, following crops.

Lange began to photograph these people, leaving her studio to document their lives in the streets and roads of California. She roamed the byways with her camera, portraying the extent of the social and economic upheaval of the Depression. It is here that Lange found her purpose and direction as one of the first of a new kind of photographer, a "documentary photographer."

Lange's photographic studies of the unemployed and homeless—starting with White Angel Breadline (1933), which depicted a lone man facing away from the crowd in front of a soup kitchen run by a widow known as the White Angel—captured the attention of local photographers and media, and eventually led to her employment with the federal Resettlement Administration (RA), later called the Farm Security Administration (FSA).

Lange developed personal techniques of talking with her subjects while working, putting them at ease and enabling her to document pertinent remarks to accompany the photography. The titles and annotations often revealed personal information about her subjects.

=== Resettlement Administration ===
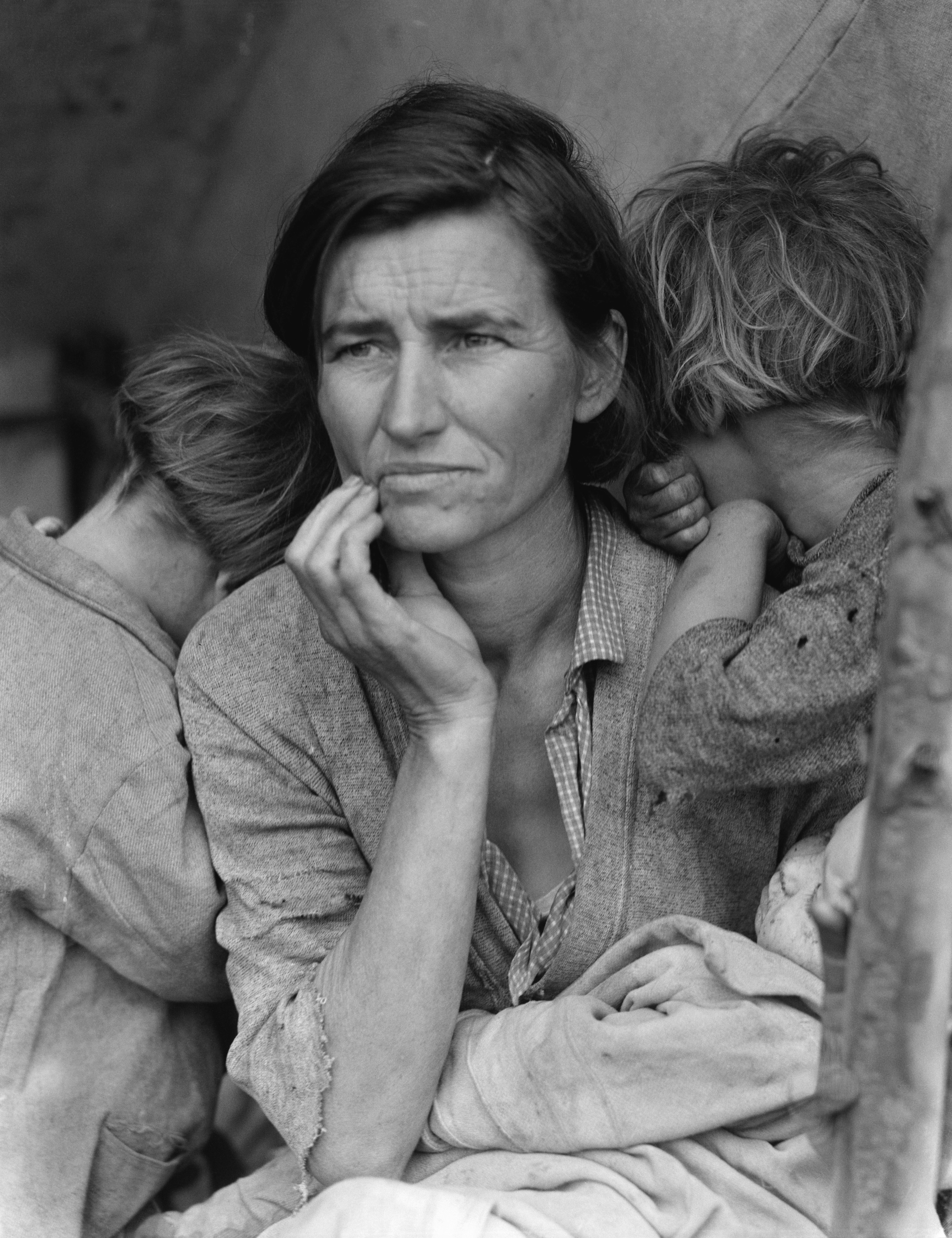
Lange's iconic 1936 photograph of Florence Owens Thompson, Migrant Mother

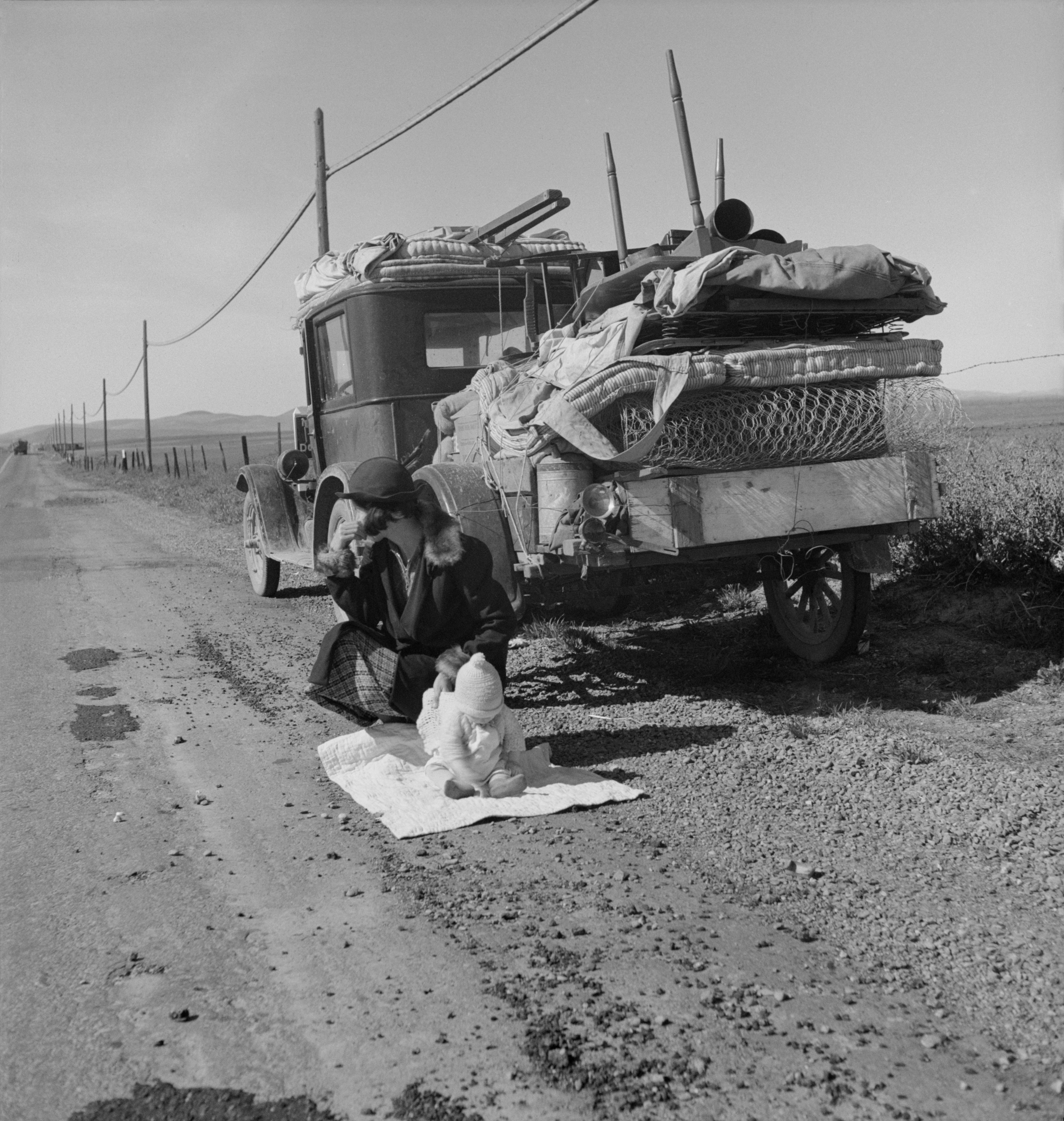
"Broke, baby sick, and car trouble!" (1937)

Lange and Dixon divorced on October 28, 1935, and on December 6 she married economist Paul Schuster Taylor, professor of economics at the University of California, Berkeley. For the next five years they traveled through the California coast and the midwest. Throughout their travels they documented rural poverty, in particular the exploitation of sharecroppers and migrant laborers. Taylor interviewed subjects and gathered economic data while Lange produced photographs and accompanying data. They lived and worked from Berkeley for the rest of her life.

Working for the Resettlement Administration and Farm Security Administration, Lange produced images that brought to public attention the plight of the poor and forgotten—particularly sharecroppers, displaced farm families, and migrant workers. Lange's work was distributed to newspapers across the country, and the poignant images became icons of the era.

One of Lange's most recognized works is Migrant Mother, published in 1936. Lange drove past a encampment of pea-pickers in Nipomo, California on her way home from weeks of traveling and photographing. Something made her turn around and drive back. This is where she took the photograph. The woman in the picture is Florence Owens Thompson. In 1960, Lange spoke about her experience taking the photograph:

I saw and approached the hungry and desperate mother, as if drawn by a magnet. I do not remember how I explained my presence or my camera to her, but I do remember she asked me no questions. I made five exposures, working closer and closer from the same direction. I did not ask her name or her history. She told me her age, that she was thirty-two. She said that they had been living on frozen vegetables from the surrounding fields, and birds that the children killed. She had just sold the tires from her car to buy food. There she sat in that lean-to tent with her children huddled around her, and seemed to know that my pictures might help her, and so she helped me. There was a sort of equality about it.

Lange reported the conditions at the camp to the editor of a San Francisco newspaper, showing him her photographs. The editor informed federal authorities and published an article that included some of the images. In response, the government rushed aid to the camp to prevent starvation.

According to Thompson's son, while Lange got some details of the story wrong, the impact of the photograph came from an image that projected both the strengths and needs of migrant workers. Twenty-two of Lange's photographs produced for the FSA were included in John Steinbeck's The Harvest Gypsies when it was first published in 1936 in The San Francisco News. Lange's photos served as inspiration for the 1940 film adaptation of The Grapes of Wrath. According to an essay by photographer Martha Rosler, Migrant Mother became the most reproduced photograph in the world.

=== Japanese American internment ===
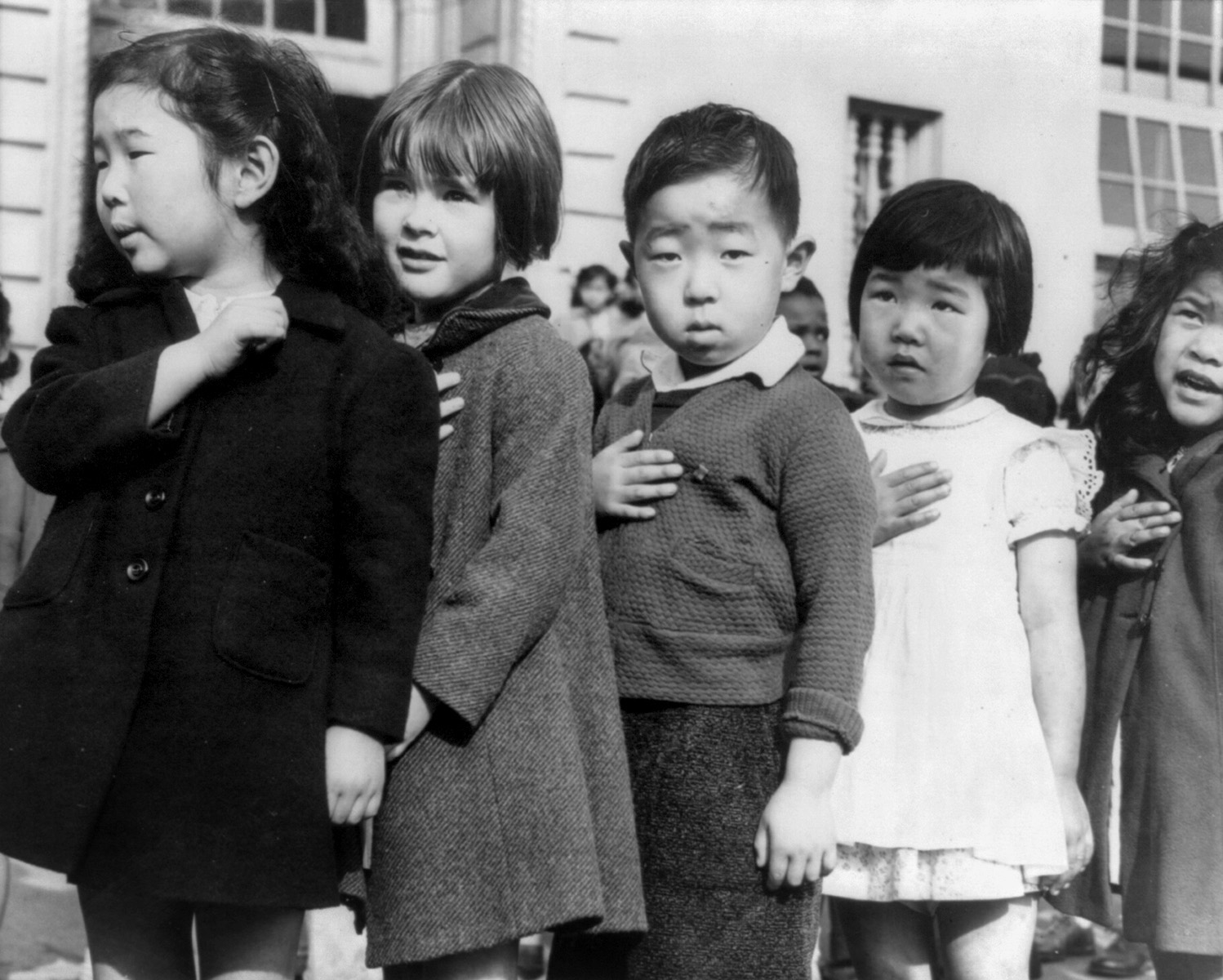
Children at the Weill public school in San Francisco recite the Pledge of Allegiance to the American flag in April 1942, prior to the internment of Japanese Americans.

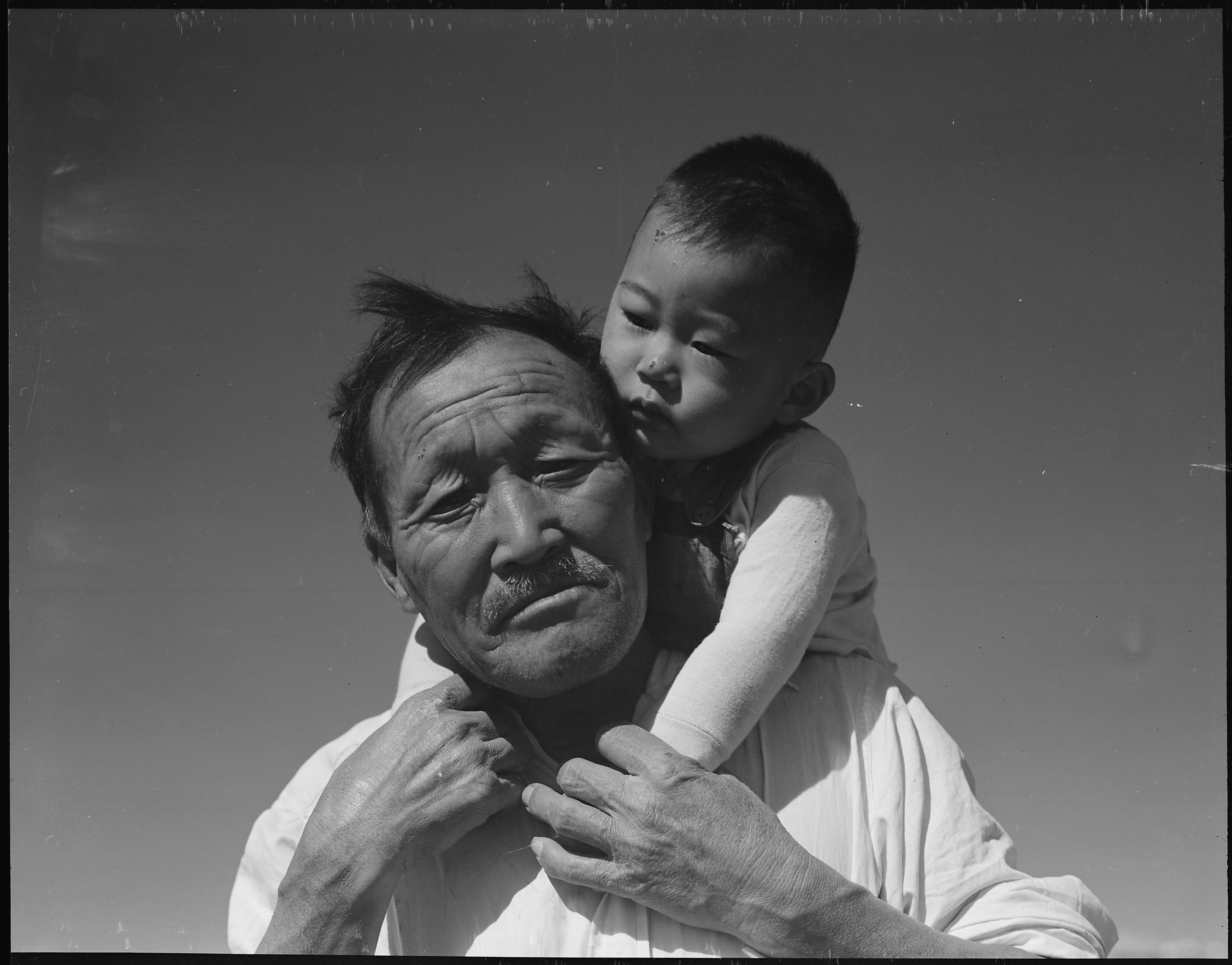
Grandfather and grandson at Manzanar Relocation Center

In 1941, Lange became the first woman to be awarded a prestigious Guggenheim Fellowship for Photography. After the attack on Pearl Harbor, she gave up the fellowship in order to go on assignment for the War Relocation Authority (WRA) to document the forced evacuation of Japanese Americans from the west coast of the US.

She covered the internment of Japanese Americans and their subsequent incarceration, traveling throughout urban and rural California to photograph families required to leave their houses and hometowns on orders of the government. Lange visited several temporary assembly centers as they opened, eventually fixing on Manzanar, the first of the permanent internment camps (located in eastern California, some 300 miles from the coast). The bulk of these works are at the National Archives and the Oakland Museum of California.

Much of Lange's work focused on the waiting and anxiety caused by the forced collection and removal of people: piles of luggage waiting to be sorted; families waiting for transport, wearing identification tags; young-to-elderly individuals, stunned, not comprehending why they must leave their homes, or what their future held. (See Exclusion, removal, detention.) To many observers, Lange's photography—including one photo of American school children pledging allegiance to the flag shortly before being removed from their homes and schools and sent to internment—is a haunting reminder of the travesty of incarcerating people who are not charged with committing a crime.

Sensitive to the implications of her images, authorities impounded most of Lange's photography of the internment process—these photos were not seen publicly during the war. Today her photography of the evacuations and internments is available in the National Archives on the website of the Still Photographs Division, at the Bancroft Library of the University of California, Berkeley, and at the Oakland Museum of California.

=== Teaching and publications ===
In 1945, Ansel Adams invited Lange to teach at the first fine art photography department at the California School of Fine Arts (CSFA), which became San Francisco Art Institute (SFAI). Imogen Cunningham and Minor White also joined the faculty.

In 1952, Lange co-founded the photography magazine Aperture. In the mid-1950s, Life magazine commissioned Lange and Pirkle Jones to shoot a documentary about the death of the town of Monticello, California, and the subsequent displacement of its residents by the damming of Putah Creek to form Lake Berryessa. After Life decided not to run the piece, Lange devoted an entire issue of Aperture to the work. The collection was shown at the Art Institute of Chicago in 1960.

Another series for Life, begun in 1954 and featuring the attorney Martin Pulich, grew out of Lange's interest in how poor people were defended in the court system, which by one account, grew out of personal experience associated with her brother's arrest and trial.

== Death and legacy ==
Unemployed lumber worker goes with his wife to the bean harvest. Note social security number tattooed on his arm. Oregon.

Lange's health declined in the last decade of her life. Among other conditions she suffered from was what later was identified as post-polio syndrome. She died of esophageal cancer on October 11, 1965, in San Francisco, at age seventy. She was survived by her second husband, economist Paul Schuster Taylor, two children and three stepchildren.

Three months after her death, the Museum of Modern Art in New York City mounted a retrospective of her work that Lange had helped to curate. It was MoMA's first retrospective solo exhibition of the works of a female photographer. In February 2020, MoMA exhibited her work again, with the title "Dorothea Lange: Words and Pictures", prompting critic Jackson Arn to write that "the first thing" this exhibition "needs to do—and does quite well—is free her from the history textbooks where she's long been jailed."

Contrasting her work with that of other twentieth century photographers such as Eugène Atget and André Kertész whose images were:

In some sense context-proof, Lange's images tend to cry out for further information. Their aesthetic power is obviously bound up in the historical importance of their subjects, and usually that historical importance has had to be communicated through words.

That characteristic has caused "art purists" and "political purists" alike to criticize Lange's work, which Arn argues is unfair: "The relationship between image and story", Arn notes, was often altered by Lange's employers as well as by government forces when her work did not suit their commercial purposes or undermined their political purposes. In his review of this exhibition, critic Brian Wallis also stressed the distortions in the "afterlife of photographs" that often went contrary to Lange's intentions. Finally, Jackson Arn situates Lange's work alongside other Depression-era artists such as Pearl Buck, Margaret Mitchell, Thornton Wilder, John Steinbeck, Frank Capra, Thomas Hart Benton, and Grant Wood in terms of their role creating a sense of the national "We".

In 1984 Lange was inducted into the International Photography Hall of Fame and Museum. In 2003, Lange was inducted into the National Women's Hall of Fame. In 2006, an elementary school was named in her honor in Nipomo, California, near the site where she had photographed Migrant Mother. In 2008, she was inducted into the California Hall of Fame, located at The California Museum for History, Women and the Arts. Her son, Daniel Dixon, accepted the honor in her place. In October 2018, Lange's hometown of Hoboken, New Jersey honored her with a mural depicting Lange and two other prominent women from Hoboken's history, Maria Pepe and Dorothy McNeil. In 2019, Rafael Blanco painted a mural of Lange outside of a photography building in Roseville, California. That same year, Time created 89 new covers to celebrate women of the year starting from 1920; it chose Lange for 1940.

== Art market ==
In May 2023, Sotheby's New York auctioned pieces from the Pier 24 Photography's oversized 1940s-era print of Migrant Mother for double estimate $609,000.

== Collections ==
- Kalamazoo Institute of Arts
- Museum of Modern Art, New York
- Whitney Museum of American Art
- Los Angeles County Museum of Art
- National Gallery of Victoria (NGV), Melbourne, Australia
- Oakland Museum of California

== See also ==
- Walker Evans
- Marion Post Wolcott
- Martha Gellhorn
- Wheelers Primitive Baptist Church
