= List of Dark Tranquillity members =

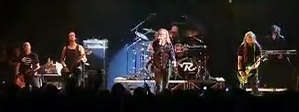
(left to right) Mikael Niklasson, Niklas Sundin, Mikael Stanne, Anders Jivarp (on drums), Martin Henriksson and Martin Brändström.

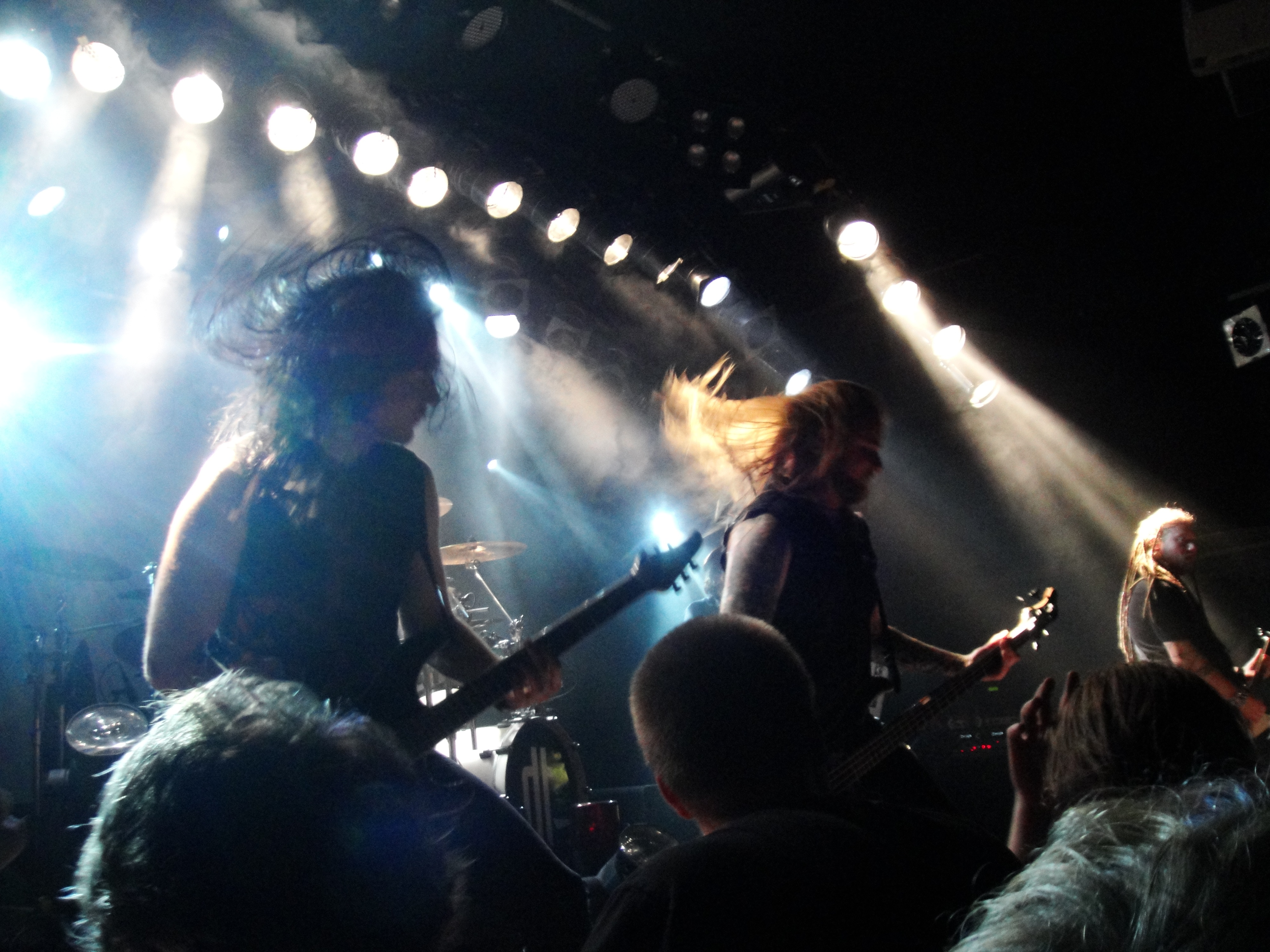
(left to right) Niklas Sundin, Anders Jivarp (on drums), Martin Brändström (obscurred), Daniel Antonsson and Martin Henriksson (Mikael Stanne not shown).

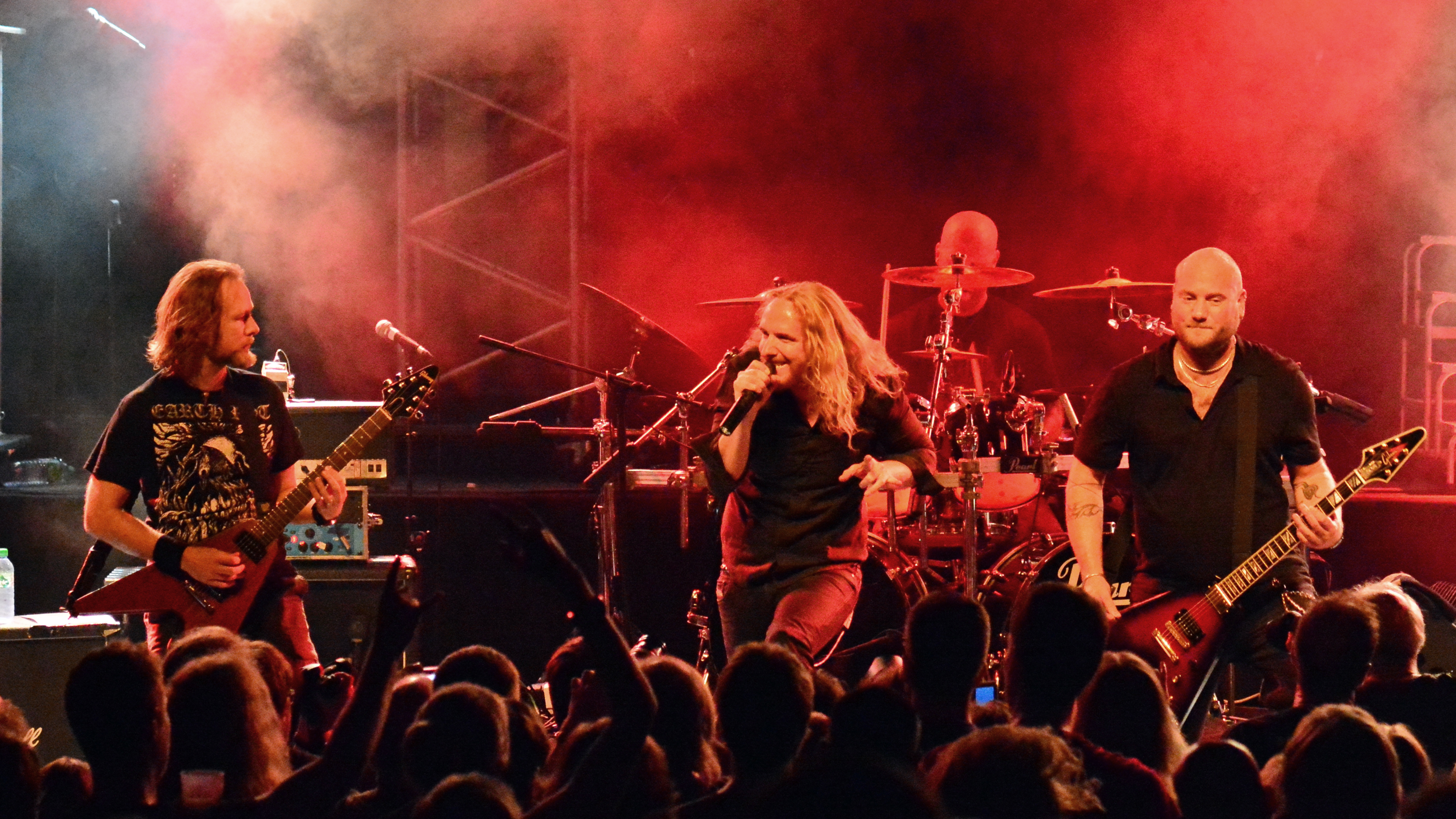
(left to right) Niklas Sundin, Mikael Stanne, Anders Jivarp and Martin Henriksson (Martin Brändström not shown).

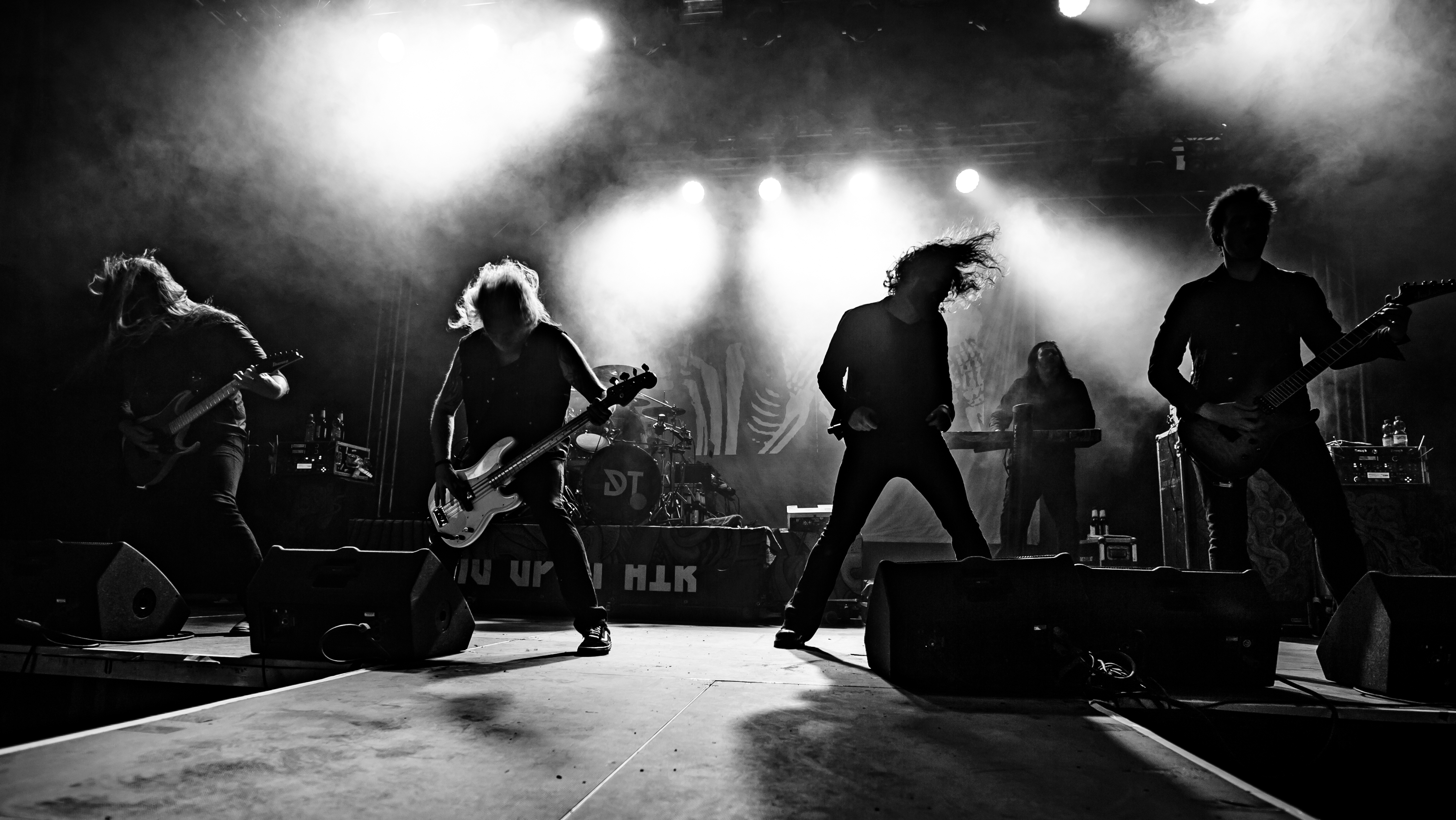
(left to right) Johan Reinholdz, Anders Iwers, Anders Jivarp (on drums), Mikael Stanne, Martin Brändström and Christopher Amott

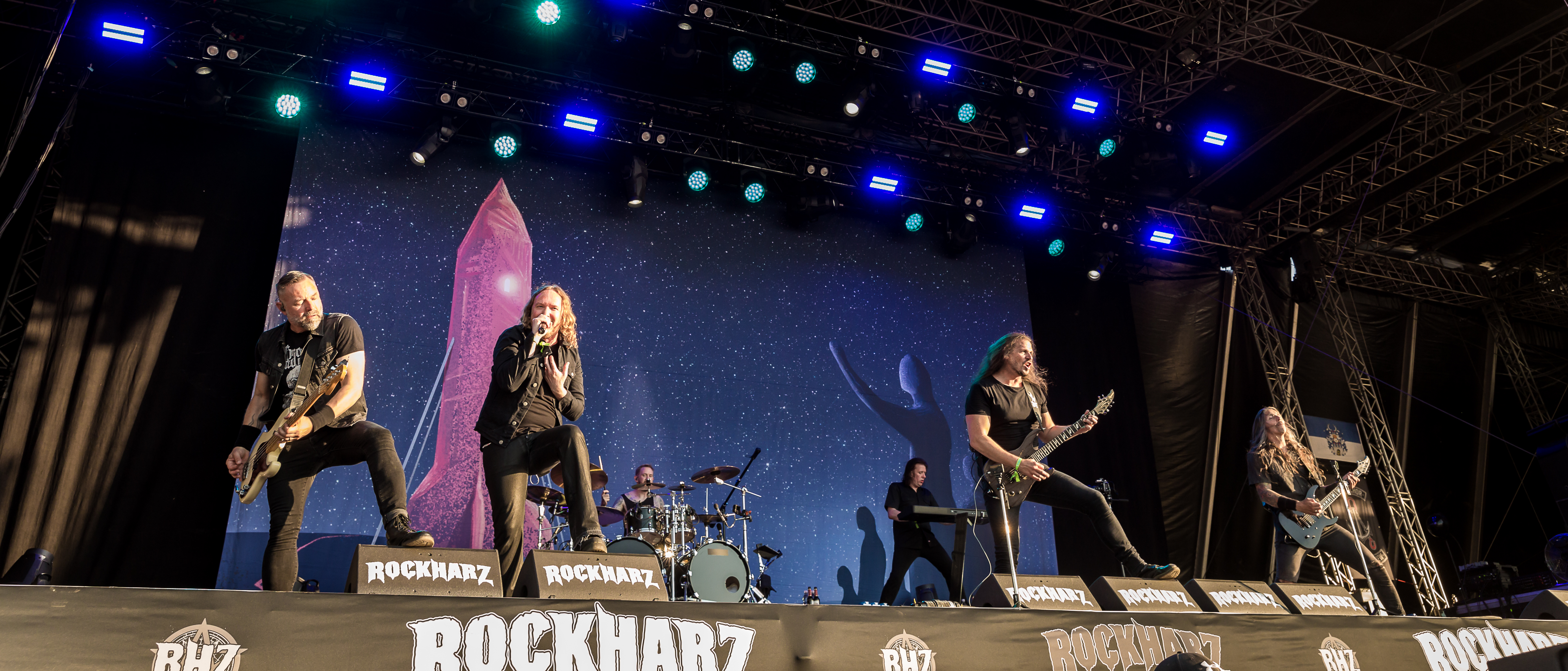
(left to right) Christian Jansson, Mikael Stanne, Joakim Strandberg Nilsson, Martin Brändström, Johan Reinholdz and Peter Lyse Karmark.

Five line-ups of Dark Tranquillity performing in 2008, 2010, 2014, 2017 and 2025

Dark Tranquillity are a Swedish melodic death metal band founded in 1989 by guitarists Mikael Stanne and Niklas Sundin. The band's first line-up also included vocalist Anders Fridén, drummer Anders Jivarp and bassist Martin Henriksson. The band currently consists of Stanne (as lead vocalist since 1993), keyboardist Martin Brändström (since 1998), guitarist Johan Reinholdz (since 2017), bassist Christian Jansson and drummer Joakim Strandberg Nilsson (both since 2021), and rhythm guitarist Peter Lyse Karmark (since 2024).

== History ==
In 1993, the band released their debut album Skydancer. Soon after its release, vocalist Friden departed to join In Flames, a band which Stanne had coincidentally been singing with. Stanne then moved onto lead vocals and Fredrik Johansson took over second guitar. This line-up continued until 1999, when Johansson departed. In his absence Henriksson moved to second guitar, and the band were also joined by Martin Brandstrom on keyboards and electronics and bassist Mikael Niklasson.

This line-up was stable until Nikalsson's departure in 2008, apart for when Jivarp took a hiatus in 2001 due to becoming a new father. Nikalsson was replaced by former Soilwork guitarist Daniel Antonsson. Antonsson later departed in 2013, and was not immediately replaced, with Henriksson playing bass on Construct. In 2016, Anders Iwers (Tiamat, ex-In Flames) was announced as bassist, having played with the band since 2015. Henriksson left the band in late 2015, admitting that he had lost passion for music, although he is still involved with the band as manager.

Jens Florén took over rhythm guitar for festival shows in 2016. Henriksson was also replaced on tour by Sebastian Myrèn later in 2016, alongside Erik Jacobsson in place of Sundin who was staying home to be with his family. Jacobsson had previously filled in for Sundin in May 2015 for the same reasons. In 2017 the band found more permanent replacements in Christopher Amott (Armageddon, Arch Enemy) and Johan Reinholdz (Andromeda, NonExist and Skyfire), who were later upgraded to full members when Sundin announced his departure in March 2020. Although Sundin has still written songs for designed albums for the band.

In August 2021 founding member Anders Jivarp and bassist Anders Iwers both departed, leaving Stanne as the lone founding member of the band. Their replacements were Christian Jansson (Grand Cadaver) and drummer Joakim Strandberg-Nilsson (In Mourning, Nonexist), who were confirmed as full members in May 2023.

Amott departed the band later that month. Joey Concepcion (also of Armageddon) was announced as his temporary replacement, Concepcion had previously played with the band in 2022. Jonathan Thorpenberg (The Unguided) replaced Concepcion as touring guitarist in 2024, before Peter Lyse Karmark (Hatesphere) took over more permanently later that year.

== Members ==
=== Current ===
Image	Name	Years active	Instruments	Release contributions
	Mikael Stanne	1989–present	lead vocals (1993–present); guitars, backing vocals (1989–1993)	all releases
	Martin Brändström	1998–present	keyboards; programming	all releases from Projector (1999) onwards
	Johan Reinholdz	2020–present (touring 2017–2020)	guitars	all releases from Moment (2020) onwards
	Christian Jansson	2021–present	bass	all releases from Endtime Signals (2024) onwards
	Joakim Strandberg Nilsson	2021–present	drums	all releases from Endtime Signals (2024) onwards
	Peter Lyse Karmark	2024–present	guitars	none to date

=== Former ===
Image	Name	Years active	Instruments	Release contributions
	Anders Jivarp	1989–2021	drums	all releases until Moment (2020)
	Niklas Sundin	1989–2020 (hiatus from 2016)	guitars	all releases until Atoma (2016)
	Martin Henriksson	1989–2015	bass (1989–1999, 2013–2015); guitars (1993–2015)	all releases until Construct (2013)
	Anders Fridén	1989–1993	lead vocals	Trail of Life Decayed (1991); A Moonclad Reflection (1992); Skydancer (1993); Exposures – In Retrospect and Denial (2004); Yesterworlds (2009); The Dying Fragments (2009)
	Fredrik Johansson	1993–1999 (died 2022)	guitars	all releases from Of Chaos and Eternal Night (1995) to Projector (1999); The Dying Fragments (2009)
	Mikael Niklasson	1999–2008	bass	all releases from Haven (2000) to Fiction (2007)
	Daniel Antonsson	2008–2012	bass	Projector (1999) 2009 live tracks only; Where Death Is Most Alive (2009); We Are the Void (2010); Zero Distance (2012)
	Anders Iwers	2015–2021	bass	Atoma (2016); Moment (2020)
	Christopher Amott	2020–2023 (touring 2017–2020)	guitars	Moment (2020)

=== Touring ===
Image	Name	Years active	Instruments	Notes
	Robin Engström	2001	drums	Engström filled in for Jivarp in 2001.
	Erik Jacobsson	2015; 2016	guitars	Jacobsson filled in for Sundin in 2015 and 2016.
	Jens Florén	2016	guitars	Florén took over rhythm guitar following the departure of Martin Henriksson.
	Sebastian Myrèn	2016–2017	guitars	Myrèn filled took over second guitar from Florén.
	Mike Bear	2022	bass	Bear filled in on bass in 2022.
	Joey Concepcion	2022; 2023	guitars	Concepcion filled in for Amott in 2022, and took over from him in when in departed in 2023.
	Jonathan Thorpenberg	2024; 2025	guitars (2024); bass (2025)	Thopenberg took over from Concepcion in 2024, and later returned to fill in on bass in 2025.

== Line-ups ==
Period	Members	Releases
1989 – early 1993	Anders Friden – vocals; Mikael Stanne – guitars, backing vocals; Niklas Sundin – guitars; Martin Henriksson – bass, acoustic guitar; Anders Jivarp – drums	Trail of Life Decayed (1991); A Moonclad Reflection (1992); Skydancer (1993); The Dying Fragments (2009)
early 1993 – late 1999	Mikael Stanne – vocals; Niklas Sundin – guitars; Martin Henriksson – bass, acoustic guitar; Anders Jivarp – drums; Fredrik Johansson – guitars	Of Chaos and Eternal Night (1995); The Gallery (1995); Enter Suicidal Angels (1996); The Mind's I (1997); Projector (1999); The Dying Fragments (2009)
late 1999 – August 2008	Mikael Stanne – vocals; Niklas Sundin – guitars; Martin Henriksson – guitars; Anders Jivarp – drums; Mikael Niklasson – bass; Martin Brändström – keyboards, programming	Haven (2000); Damage Done (2002); Live Damage (2003); Lost to Apathy (2004); Character (2005); Fiction (2007)
October 2008 – February 2013	Mikael Stanne – vocals; Niklas Sundin – guitars; Martin Henriksson – guitars; Anders Jivarp – drums; Martin Brändström – keyboards, programming; Daniel Antonsson – bass	Where Death Is Most Alive (2009); We Are the Void (2010); Zero Distance (2012)
February 2013 – early 2015	Mikael Stanne – vocals; Niklas Sundin – guitars; Martin Henriksson – guitars, bass; Anders Jivarp – drums; Martin Brändström – keyboards, programming	Construct (2013)
mid – late 2015	Mikael Stanne – vocals; Niklas Sundin – guitars (not touring); Martin Henriksson – guitars; Anders Jivarp – drums; Martin Brändström – keyboards, programming; Anders Iwers – bass (touring); Erik Jacobsson – guitars (touring)	none – live shows only
early – late 2016	Mikael Stanne – vocals; Niklas Sundin – guitars; Anders Jivarp – drums; Martin Brändström – keyboards, programming; Anders Iwers – bass; Jens Florén – guitars (touring)	Atoma (2016)
late 2016 – early 2017	Mikael Stanne – vocals; Niklas Sundin – guitars (on hiatus); Anders Jivarp – drums; Martin Brändström – keyboards, programming; Anders Iwers – bass; Erik Jacobsson – guitars (touring); Sebastian Myrèn – guitars (touring)	none – live shows only
early 2017 – March 2020	Mikael Stanne – vocals; Niklas Sundin – guitars (on hiatus); Anders Jivarp – drums; Martin Brändström – keyboards, programming; Anders Iwers – bass; Christopher Amott – guitars (touring); Johan Reinholdz – guitars (touring)	none – live shows only
March 2020 – August 2021	Mikael Stanne – vocals; Anders Jivarp – drums; Martin Brändström – keyboards, programming; Anders Iwers – bass; Christopher Amott – guitars; Johan Reinholdz – guitars	Moment (2020)
August 2021 – mid 2023	Mikael Stanne – vocals; Martin Brändström – keyboards, programming; Christopher Amott – guitars; Johan Reinholdz – guitars; Christian Jansson – bass (touring); Joakim Strandberg Nilsson – drums (touring)	none – live shows only
mid – late 2023	Mikael Stanne – vocals; Martin Brändström – keyboards, programming; Johan Reinholdz – guitars; Christian Jansson – bass; Joakim Strandberg Nilsson – drums; Joey Conception – guitars (touring)	Endtime Signals (2024)
early 2024	Mikael Stanne – vocals; Martin Brändström – keyboards, programming; Johan Reinholdz – guitars; Christian Jansson – bass; Joakim Strandberg Nilsson – drums; Jonathan Thorpenberg – guitars (touring)	Endtime Signals (2024)
mid 2024 – present	Mikael Stanne – vocals; Martin Brändström – keyboards, programming; Johan Reinholdz – guitars; Christian Jansson – bass; Joakim Strandberg Nilsson – drums; Peter Lyse Karmark – guitars	none to date
