= Dark Tranquillity discography =

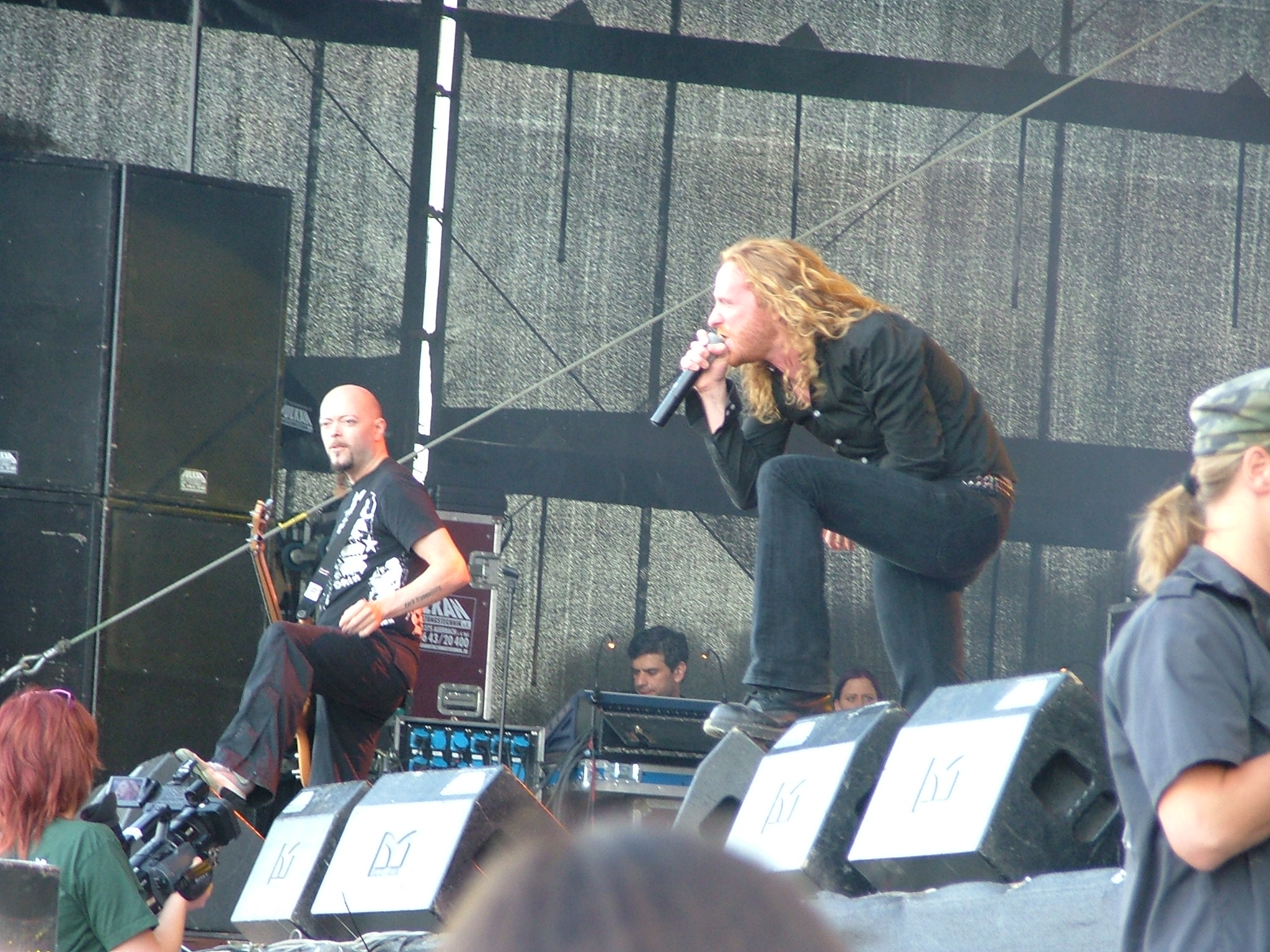
- Dark Tranquillity at Summer Breeze Open Air 2007
- Studio albums: 13
- Extended plays: 5
- Live albums: 3
- Compilation albums: 3
- Video albums: 2
- Music videos: 15

The following is the discography of Dark Tranquillity, a six-piece Swedish melodic death metal band formed in Gothenburg in 1989. They are one of the longest-standing bands from the original Gothenburg metal scene. Since 2020 their line-up consists of vocalist Mikael Stanne, keyboardist Martin Brändström, and guitarists Christopher Amott and Johan Reinholdz.

== Albums ==
=== Studio albums ===
Title	Album details	Peak chart positions					
Title	Album details	SWE	AUT	FIN	FRA	GER	SWI
Skydancer	Released: 30 August 1993; Label: Spinefarm (# SPI34); Format: CD, LP	—	—	—	—	—	—
The Gallery	Released: 27 November 1995; Label: Osmose (# OPCD 033); Format: CD, LP	—	—	—	—	—	—
The Mind's I	Released: 21 April 1997; Label: Osmose (# OPCD 052); Format: CD, LP	—	—	—	—	—	—
Projector	Released: 10 August 1999; Label: Century Media (# 77285); Format: CD, LP	—	—	—	—	—	—
Haven	Released: 25 July 2000; Label: Century Media (# 77297); Format: CD, LP	—	—	—	—	—	—
Damage Done	Released: 20 August 2002; Label: Century Media (# 77403); Format: CD, LP	29	—	—	146	83	—
Character	Released: 25 January 2005; Label: Century Media (# 77603); Format: CD, LP	3	—	30	173	83	—
Fiction	Released: 24 April 2007; Label: Century Media (# 77615); Format: CD, LP	12	—	19	145	59	—
We Are the Void	Released: 9 March 2010; Label: Century Media (# 77615); Format: CD, LP	9	—	16	138	59	70
Construct	Released: 28 May 2013; Label: Century Media; Format: CD, LP	9	67	15	136	37	68
Atoma	Released: 4 November 2016; Label: Century Media; Format: CD, LP	2	40	15	108	23	36
Moment	Released: 20 November 2020; Label: Century Media; Format: CD, LP	14	24	9	181	17	16
Endtime Signals	Released: 16 August 2024; Label: Century Media; Format: CD, LP	13	7	15	105	6	5
"—" denotes releases that did not chart or were not released in that country.

=== Live albums ===
Title	Year
Live Damage	2003
Where Death Is Most Alive	2009
For the Fans	2013

=== Compilation albums ===
Title	Year
Exposures – In Retrospect and Denial	2004
Yesterworlds	2009
The Dying Fragments	2009
Manifesto of Dark Tranquillity	2009

== Extended plays ==
Title	Year	Peak chart positions
Title	Year	SWE
Trail of Life Decayed	1991	—
A Moonclad Reflection	1992	—
Of Chaos and Eternal Night	1995	—
Enter Suicidal Angels	1996	—
Lost to Apathy	2004	47
Zero Distance	2012	—
"—" denotes a release that did not chart.

== Videos ==
Title	Video details
Live Damage	Released: 29 September 2003; Label: Century Media; Format: DVD
Where Death Is Most Alive	Released: 26 October 2009; Label: Century Media; Format: DVD

== Music videos ==
Year	Title	Director	Album
1997	"Hedon"	Dick Bewarp	The Mind's I
1997	"Zodijackyl Light"	Dick Bewarp	The Mind's I
1999	"ThereIn"	Henrik Bengtsson	Projector
2002	"Monochromatic Stains"	Achilleas Gatsopoulos	Damage Done
2005	"Lost to Apathy"	Roger Johansson	Character
2005	"The New Build"	Roger Johansson	Character
2007	"Focus Shift"	Roger Johansson	Fiction
2007	"Terminus (Where Death Is Most Alive)"	Sven Kirk	Fiction
2009	"Misery's Crown"	Roger Johansson	Fiction
2010	"Shadow in Our Blood"	Vasara Films	We Are the Void
2011	"Iridium"	Niklas Sundin	We Are the Void
2011	"Zero Distance"	Aduro Labs	We Are the Void
2012	"In My Absence"	Niklas Sundin	We Are the Void
2013	"Uniformity"	Patric Ullaeus	Construct
2015	"The Science of Noise"	Cabin Fever Media	Construct
2016	"The Pitiless"	Dirk Behlau	Atoma
2016	"Atoma"	Unknown	Atoma
2016	"Forward Momentum"	Harri Haataja	Atoma
2020	"Phantom Days"	Unknown	Moment
2020	"The Dark Unbroken"	Erik Eger	Moment
2020	"Eyes of the World"	Erik Eger	Moment
