= Where Death Is Most Alive =

Video album by Dark Tranquillity
- Released: October 26, 2009
- Recorded: 1991–2008
- Genre: Melodic death metal
- Length: 1:48:27
- Label: Century Media

Dark Tranquillity chronology
Live Damage (2003)	Where Death Is Most Alive (2009)

Where Death Is Most Alive is the second live album by Swedish melodic death metal band Dark Tranquillity, released on October 26, 2009. It was also released in a limited edition two-CD – two-DVD boxset as well as two-CD format. Only the live performance in Milan was released also on the CD version.

== DVD Disc 1 ==
=== Live in Milan - October 31st, 2008 ===
1. "Intro"
2. "The Treason Wall"
3. "The New Build"
4. "Focus Shift"
5. "The Lesser Faith"
6. "The Wonders At Your Feet"
7. "Lost To Apathy"
8. "FreeCard"
9. "Inside The Particle Storm"
10. "Nothing To No One"
11. "Edenspring"
12. "Insanity's Crescendo"
13. "Lethe"
14. "Dreamlore Degenerate"
15. "Misery's Crown"
16. "ThereIn"
17. "My Negation"
18. "Yesterworld/Punish My Heaven"
19. "The Mundane And The Magic"
20. "Final Resistance"
21. "Terminus (Where Death Is Most Alive)"

=== Track Information ===
- Tracks 2 & 20 are from Damage Done.
- Tracks 3, 7 & 17 are from Character
- Tracks 4, 5, 9, 10, 15, 19 & 21 are from Fiction
- Tracks 6 is from Haven
- Tracks 8 & 16 are from Projector
- Tracks 11, 13 & 18 are from The Gallery
- Tracks 12 & 14 are from The Mind's I
- Track 18 is from A Moonclad Reflection

== DVD Disc 2 ==
=== Out Of Nothing – The DT Documentary ===
- "Out Of Nothing – The DT Documentary"

=== Promo videos ===
1. "ThereIn" (Official Video)
2. "Monochromatic Stains" (Official Video)
3. "Lost To Apathy" (Official Video)
4. "The New Build" (Official Video)
5. "Focus Shift" (Official Video)
6. "Terminus (Where Death Is Most Alive)" (Official Video)
7. "Misery's Crown" (Official Video)

=== The Live Archive ===
1. "Only Time Can Tell" (Rehearsal, Billdal 1991)
2. "The Dying Fragments Of An Enderly Dream" (Valvet, Gothenburg 1991)
3. "Soulbreed" (Ljungskile 1991)
4. "Yesterworld" (Musikens Hus, Gothenburg 1992)
5. "Alone" (Fågeln, Gothenburg 1992)
6. "My Faery Land Forgotten" (Fågeln, Gothenburg 1992)
7. "Nightfall By The Shore Of Time" (Fågeln, Gothenburg 1992)
8. "Skywards" (Gamlestaden, Gothenburg 1992)
9. "Shadow Duet" (Karlstad 1994)
10. "Crimson Winds" (Karlstad 1994)
11. "Razorfever" (Rotterdam, Netherlands 1997)
12. "Constant" (Rotterdam, Netherlands 1997)
13. "Tongues" (Rotterdam, Netherlands 1997)
14. "Feast Of Burden" (2001)
15. "Indifferent Suns" (2002)
16. "The Sun Fired Blanks" (2002)
17. "Hours Passed In Exile" (2002)
18. "Damage Done" (2004)
19. "One Thought" (2004)
20. "The Endless Feed" (2007)
21. "Blind At Heart" (2007)

== CD Disc 1 (Live in Milan) ==
=== Live in Milan – October 31st, 2008 ===
1. "Intro"
2. "The Treason Wall"
3. "The New Build"
4. "Focus Shift"
5. "The Lesser Faith"
6. "The Wonders At Your Feet"
7. "Lost To Apathy"
8. "FreeCard"
9. "Inside the Particle Storm"
10. "Nothing To No One"
11. "Edenspring"

== CD Disc 2 (Live in Milan) ==
=== Live in Milan – October 31st, 2008 ===
1. "Insanity's Crescendo"
2. "Lethe
3. "Dreamlore Degenerate"
4. "Misery's Crown"
5. "ThereIn"
6. "My Negation"
7. "Yesterworld/Punish My Heaven"
8. "The Mundane And The Magic"
9. "Final Resistance"
10. "Terminus (Where Death Is Most Alive)"
