= Enter Suicidal Angels =

EP by Dark Tranquillity
- Released: 25 November 1996
- Recorded: 1996
- Genre: Melodic death metal
- Length: 15:09
- Label: Osmose
- Producer: Fredrik Nordström

Dark Tranquillity chronology
The Gallery (1995)	Enter Suicidal Angels (1996)	The Mind's I (1997)

Enter Suicidal Angels is the fourth EP by Swedish melodic death metal band Dark Tranquillity. It was recorded during the sessions for The Mind's I and it was also released as bonus tracks of the reissue of The Mind's I. Another reissue of the EP was released in October 2010 as a Gramophone record. In terms of the standard issue of this album, this is the only Dark Tranquillity release that Martin Henriksson did not have a writing credit during his tenure in the band. The song "Zodijackyl Light" was also included on The Mind's I. The song "Archetype" is a remix of several songs from the recording sessions and done in the vein of industrial and techno by guitarist Fredrik Johansson and producer Fredrik Nordström under the collective pseudonym "DJ L-KMAN".

== Track listing ==
All lyrics are written by Mikael Stanne.

No.	Title	Music	Length
1.	"Zodijackyl Light"	Sundin, Johansson	3:59
2.	"Razorfever"	Sundin, Jivarp	3:16
3.	"Shadowlit Facade"	Johansson	3:25
4.	"Archetype"	Johansson, Nordström	4:29
Total length:			15:09

The Mind's I's Osmose Productions Special "Deluxe" Edition (2004)
No.	Title	Lyrics	Music	Length
1.	"Dreamlore Degenerate"	Stanne	Henriksson, Sundin	2:44
2.	"Zodijackyl Light"	Stanne	Sundin, Johansson	3:59
3.	"Hedon"	Sundin	Henriksson, Sundin	5:37
4.	"Scythe, Rage and Roses"	Stanne	Henriksson	2:33
5.	"Constant"	Stanne	Sundin, Johansson	3:02
6.	"Dissolution Factor Red"	Sundin, Stanne	Johansson, Sundin	2:07
7.	"Insanity's Crescendo"	Stanne	Henriksson, Johansson, Sundin	6:52
8.	"Still Moving Sinews"	Sundin, Stanne	Sundin, Johansson	4:42
9.	"Atom Heart 243.5"	Sundin	Sundin, Johansson, Henriksson	4:00
10.	"Tidal Tantrum"	Stanne	Johansson	2:57
11.	"Tongues"	Sundin	Henriksson, Johansson, Sundin	4:53
12.	"The Mind's Eye"	(Instrumental)	Palm, Johansson	3:11
13.	"Razorfever"	Stanne	Sundin, Jivarp	3:16
14.	"Shadowlit Facade"	Stanne	Johansson	3:25
15.	"Archetype"		Johansson, Nordström	4:29
16.	"Zodijackyl Light (Video)"	Stanne	Sundin, Johansson	3:59
17.	"Hedon (Video)"	Sundin	Henriksson, Sundin	5:37

== Credits ==
=== Dark Tranquillity ===
- Mikael Stanne − vocals
- Niklas Sundin − guitar
- Fredrik Johansson − guitar
- Martin Henriksson − bass guitar
- Anders Jivarp − drums

=== Additional personnel on "Archetype" ===
- Fredrik Nordström - music
- DJ L-Kman - remix
