= Cemetery Skyline =

Finnish-Swedish gothic rock band

Cemetery Skyline is a Finnish-Swedish gothic rock/metal supergroup formed by Mikael Stanne, Markus Vanhala, Santeri Kallio, Victor Brandt, and Vesa Ranta in 2024.

== History ==
The band was formed in 2024 and played their first show at John Smith festival in Finland. The founding members are Mikael Stanne (Dark Tranquility), Markus Vanhala (Insomnium, Omnium Gatherum), Santeri Kallio (Amorphis), Victor Brandt (Dimmu Borgir), and Vesa Ranta (Sentenced).

They released their first album, Nordic Gothic, in October 2024 through Century Media Records. Leading up to the release, the band released videos for their songs "Violent Storm", "The Coldest Heart", "Torn Away", and "In Darkness". Nordic Gothic debuted at number 3 on the Finnish album chart and at number 1 on the Finnish physical album chart the week after its release.

== Musical style ==
Cemetery Skyline play melodic gothic rock/metal. Keyboardist Santeri Kallio cited bands such as Type O Negative, The Mission, The Sisters of Mercy, and Killing Joke as influences. In reviews of the album Nordic Gothic, comparisons were drawn with bands such as Tiamat, Fields of the Nephilim, or HIM. In contrast to his other bands, singer Mikael Stanne relies entirely on clean vocals for Cemetery Skyline and refrains from growling.

== Members ==
- Mikael Stanne – vocals
- Markus Vanhala – guitars
- Santeri Kallio – keyboards
- Victor Brandt – bass
- Vesa Ranta – drums

== Discography ==
=== Albums ===
- Nordic Gothic (2024)

=== Singles ===
- "Violent Storm" (2024)
- "In Darkness" (2024)
- "The Coldest Heart" (2024)
- "Torn Away" (2024)
- "Behind the Lie" (2024)
- "I Drove All Night" (2025)
