= Of Chaos and Eternal Night =

EP by Dark Tranquillity
- Released: 3 February 1995
- Recorded: October–November 1994 at Studio Fredman and Studio Bohus (1–3) June 1993 at Studio Soundscape, Gothenburg, Sweden (4)
- Genre: Melodic death metal
- Length: 19:47
- Label: Spinefarm
- Producer: Fredrik Nordström, Dark Tranquillity

Dark Tranquillity chronology
Skydancer (1993)	Of Chaos and Eternal Night (1995)	The Gallery (1995)

Alternative cover

Professional ratings
Review scores
Source	Rating
Allmusic	2/5 stars

Of Chaos and Eternal Night is the second EP by Swedish melodic death metal band Dark Tranquillity. It is the first studio recording by the band featuring Mikael Stanne as the lead vocalist, who switched from playing rhythm guitar to singing after the firing of original vocalist Anders Friden. Consequently, it is also the band's first studio recording to feature Fredrik Johansson on rhythm guitar. The EP would be Dark Tranquillity's final release with Spinefarm Records, whose contract with the band expired after its release. The album is made up of three newly written songs, as well as a new version of the song “Alone” from their debut album Skydancer with re-recorded vocals by Stanne.

== Background and Recording ==
Shortly after the release of Skydancer, the band decided to fire vocalist Anders Friden, as they felt they “couldn’t work with him.” Following this, Stanne, who had previously sung vocals on a few songs on 'Skydancer', decided to switch to vocals full time. In a retrospective interview with Invisible Oranges, Stanne spoke about how he often felt more excited to record the vocal parts he performed on Skydancer than he did about his actual guitar parts. Initially, Stanne had planned to handle both vocals and rhythm guitars. However, as he was unable to cope, the band decided to recruit Fredrik Johansson, who was a childhood friend of bassist Martin Henriksson, and had known the other band members for several years. Following these lineup changes, the new lineup immediately begin writing new music. In 1994, the band recorded a promotional tape featuring three new songs: “Punish My Heaven”, “Away, Delight, Away” and “The Gallery”. The tape was recorded on an eight-track machine in the band's rehearsal studio, used to help the band scout for labels to release their as-of-yet unrecorded second full-length album. The version of “Away, Delight, Away” differs heavily from the version which would later be recorded for Of Chaos and Eternal Night.

Though the band had already written roughly a dozen songs at that point, it was decided that they would first record an EP to bridge the gap between the Skydancer and their second album, which was set to come out after a two-year gap. The band entered Studio Fredman to record the EP. This would be the first of many releases the band would record at the studio under the guidance of producer Fredrik Nordström. Along with this, Stanne went to Studio Bohus in the nearby city of Kungälv to re-record vocals for the song “Alone”, which had previously been released on Skydancer. As with Skydancer, the cover art and photography for Of Chaos and Eternal Night were done by Kenneth Johansson. The EP was released by Spinefarm on 3 February 1995. When the album was pressed, there was a printing error that resulted in the first 2000 copies shipping without lyrics. The EP would sell well, further spreading Dark Tranquillity's name within underground metal circles.

The EP has frequently been paired with Skydancer, with the tracks being included as bonus tracks for the latter on Japanese editions. A compilation of the two releases with new artwork by Sundin was later released in 1999, by Century Media Records. In 2013, the band revealed they had reclaimed the rights to both releases, eventually remastering and releasing them on Bandcamp and streaming services. The next year, Century Media Records released the EP on vinyl, featuring another new cover by Sundin.

== Music and Lyrics ==
Musically, the EP has been compared to the band's previous album, Skydancer, containing the same melodic death metal style with complex arrangements and lyrics. However, in an interview, Sundin noted that “the songs [had] more solid arrangements and are more congruent”. Eduardo Rivadavia of AllMusic argues that this EP represents a transitional release from the band's “excessively Byzantine beginnings to the disciplined arrangements of the future.”

== Track listing ==
No.	Title	Lyrics	Music	Length
1.	"Of Chaos and Eternal Night"	Stanne	Sundin, Johansson, Jivarp	5:12
2.	"With the Flaming Shades of Fall"	Stanne, Sundin	Sundin, Johansson, Henriksson	3:38
3.	"Away, Delight, Away"	Stanne	Henriksson, Johansson	5:22
4.	"Alone"	Sundin	Henriksson, Sundin	5:43
Total length:				19:47

== Credits ==
=== Dark Tranquillity ===
- Mikael Stanne − vocals
- Niklas Sundin − lead guitar
- Fredrik Johansson − rhythm guitar
- Martin Henriksson − bass guitar
- Anders Jivarp − drums

=== Guests ===
- Fredrik Nordström − engineering (songs 1–3), keyboards
- Dragan Tanascovic − engineering (song 4)
- Kenneth Johansson − additional personnel
