= Lost to Apathy =

EP by Dark Tranquillity
- Released: 15 November 2004
- Recorded: 2004
- Genre: Melodic death metal; industrial metal
- Length: 17:23
- Language: English
- Label: Century Media
- Producer: Martin Brändström

Dark Tranquillity chronology
Exposures - In Retrospect and Denial (2004)	Lost to Apathy (2004)	Character (2005)

Lost to Apathy is the fifth EP by Swedish melodic death metal band Dark Tranquillity. It was released on 15 November 2004 through Century Media Records. All songs were recorded from the Character album, except the live version of "Undo Control" which is from the previously released Live Damage DVD. The album also includes the video for "Lost to Apathy", produced by Roger Johansson (who worked with other bands such as The Haunted, In Flames, and HammerFall) and a Dark Tranquillity screensaver.

"Lost to Apathy" is on the Alone in the Dark (see Page) soundtrack. "Derivation TNB" is a joint remix of some clean riffs from "The New Build", "Mind Matters" and "Dry Run", songs from Character. A shorter version (only the "New Build" riff) can be found at the end of "Through Smudged Lenses", also in the Character album. The EP also includes an industrial remix of "The Endless Feed".

== Track listing ==
No.	Title	Length
1.	"Lost to Apathy"	4:37
2.	"Derivation TNB"	3:25
3.	"The Endless Feed" (Chaos seed remix)	3:56
4.	"Undo Control" (Live in Krakow, Poland)	5:25

=== Multimedia enhancements ===
No.	Title	Length
1.	"Lost to Apathy" (video)
2.	"Dark Tranquillity screensaver"

== Credits ==
Dark Tranquillity

- Mikael Stanne − vocals
- Martin Henriksson − guitar
- Niklas Sundin − guitar
- Michael Nicklasson − bass
- Martin Brändström − electronics
- Anders Jivarp − drums

Guests

- All tracks mastered by Peter In de Betou at Tailor maid
- Artwork design by Cabin Fever Media
