= Damage Done =

Studio album by Dark Tranquillity
- Released: 22 July 2002
- Recorded: February–March 2002 at Studio Fredman
- Genre: Melodic death metal
- Length: 51:23
- Label: Century Media
- Producer: Dark Tranquillity, Fredrik Nordström

Dark Tranquillity chronology
Haven (2000)	Damage Done (2002)	Live Damage (2003)

LP Cover
- LP edition cover

Professional ratings
Review scores
Source	Rating
AllMusic	4/5 stars
Chronicles of Chaos	4.5/5 stars
Sputnikmusic	4.5/5 stars

Damage Done is the sixth studio album by Swedish melodic death metal band Dark Tranquillity. Here, the band returns to a more classic style while holding the changes made in their albums Haven and Projector, especially in the keyboards, but this is the first record since The Mind's I that does not feature clean vocals. Martin Henriksson started doing some "lead guitar riffs" on the record, so the band showed influences from The Gallery in the duality of lead guitars. Mikael Stanne said that the lyrics on this album are about the frailty of life.

The song "Cathode Ray Sunshine" is featured in the video game's soundtrack, Brütal Legend.

Several versions of the album feature a bonus track entitled "I, Deception" as well as the "Monochromatic Stains" video clip but it is known that the limited edition digipak contains them. The Japanese version of the album features the bonus track, "The Poison Well". The vinyl release includes "I, Deception" and also has different cover art. The 2009 reissue includes bonus tracks and digitally remastered audio.

This is the first release for the band to chart. The album cover art which was done by Niklas Sundin feature's Mikael Stanne kneeling and holding his head.

== Track listing ==
All lyrics are written by Mikael Stanne.

No.	Title	Music	Length
1.	"Final Resistance"	Henriksson	3:01
2.	"Hours Passed in Exile"	Henriksson; Jivarp; Nicklasson; Brändström	4:45
3.	"Monochromatic Stains"	Jivarp; Brändström	3:37
4.	"Single Part of Two"	Jivarp; Henriksson	3:51
5.	"The Treason Wall"	Jivarp; Henriksson	3:30
6.	"Format C: for Cortex"	Jivarp; Henriksson; Sundin	4:29
7.	"Damage Done"	Henriksson; Jivarp	3:27
8.	"Cathode Ray Sunshine"	Brändström; Jivarp; Henriksson	4:14
9.	"The Enemy"	Henriksson; Nicklasson; Jivarp	3:56
10.	"White Noise / Black Silence"	Henriksson; Jivarp	4:09
11.	"Ex Nihilo" (instrumental)	Sundin; Nicklasson; Henriksson	4:33

Japanese bonus track
No.	Title	Music	Length
12.	"The Poison Well"	Jivarp; Sundin; Henriksson	4:07

Vinyl edition
No.	Title	Music	Length
1.	"Final Resistance"	Henriksson	3:01
2.	"Hours Passed in Exile"	Henriksson; Jivarp; Nicklasson; Brändström	4:45
3.	"Monochromatic Stains"	Jivarp; Brändström	3:37
4.	"Single Part of Two"	Jivarp; Henriksson	3:51
5.	"The Treason Wall"	Jivarp; Henriksson	3:30
6.	"Format C: For Cortex"	Jivarp; Henriksson; Sundin	4:29
7.	"Damage Done"	Henriksson; Jivarp	3:27
8.	"Cathode Ray Sunshine"	Brändström; Jivarp; Henriksson	4:14
9.	"The Enemy"	Henriksson; Nicklasson; Jivarp	3:56
10.	"I, Deception"	Henriksson; Nicklasson; Jivarp; Sundin; Brändström	3:54
11.	"White Noise / Black Silence"	Henriksson; Jivarp	4:09
12.	"Ex Nihilo" (instrumental)	Sundin; Nicklasson; Henriksson	4:33

Limited edition digipak and first edition jewel case
No.	Title	Music	Length
1.	"Final Resistance"	Henriksson	3:01
2.	"Hours Passed in Exile"	Henriksson; Jivarp; Nicklasson; Brändström	4:45
3.	"Monochromatic Stains"	Jivarp; Brändström	3:37
4.	"Single Part of Two"	Jivarp; Henriksson	3:51
5.	"The Treason Wall"	Jivarp; Henriksson	3:30
6.	"Format C: For Cortex"	Jivarp; Henriksson; Sundin	4:29
7.	"Damage Done"	Henriksson; Jivarp	3:27
8.	"Cathode Ray Sunshine"	Brändström; Jivarp; Henriksson	4:14
9.	"The Enemy"	Henriksson; Nicklasson; Jivarp	3:56
10.	"I, Deception"	Henriksson; Nicklasson; Jivarp; Sundin; Brändström	3:54
11.	"White Noise / Black Silence"	Henriksson; Jivarp	4:09
12.	"Ex Nihilo" (instrumental)	Sundin; Nicklasson; Henriksson	4:33
13.	"Monochromatic Stains" (music video)	Jivarp; Brändström	3:42

2009 Reissue
No.	Title	Music	Length
1.	"Final Resistance"	Henriksson	3:02
2.	"Hours Passed in Exile"	Henriksson; Jivarp; Nicklasson; Brändström	4:46
3.	"Monochromatic Stains"	Jivarp; Brändström	3:38
4.	"Single Part of Two"	Jivarp; Henriksson	3:51
5.	"The Treason Wall"	Jivarp; Henriksson	3:31
6.	"Format C: for Cortex"	Jivarp; Henriksson; Sundin	4:30
7.	"Damage Done"	Henriksson; Jivarp	3:27
8.	"Cathode Ray Sunshine"	Brändström; Jivarp; Henriksson	4:14
9.	"The Enemy"	Henriksson; Nicklasson; Jivarp	3:56
10.	"White Noise / Black Silence"	Henriksson; Jivarp	4:09
11.	"Ex Nihilo" (instrumental)	Sundin; Nicklasson; Henriksson	4:31
12.	"I, Deception"	Henriksson; Nicklasson; Jivarp; Sundin; Brändström	3:55
13.	"Static"	Henriksson; Jivarp; Brändström	4:40
14.	"The Poison Well"	Jivarp; Sundin; Henriksson	4:07
15.	"The Treason Wall" (live, recorded at Rolling Stone, Milan, Italy, 31 October 2008)	Jivarp; Henriksson	3:57

== Credits ==
=== Personnel ===
==== Dark Tranquillity ====
- Mikael Stanne - vocals
- Niklas Sundin - guitars
- Martin Henriksson - guitars
- Martin Brändström - electronics
- Michael Nicklasson - bass
- Anders Jivarp - drums

==== Production ====
- Dark Tranquillity – production
- Fredrik Nordström - production, engineering
- Patrik J. Sten - engineering
- Göran Finnberg - audio mastering
- Ulf Horbelt – remastering
- Achilleas Gatsopoulos - Video for "Monochromatic Stains".
- Cabin Fever Media - Co-Art direction and design
- Tue Madsen – mixing, mastering ("The Treason Wall" only)

=== Studios ===
- The Mastering Room – mastering
- DMS, Marl, Germany – remastering

== Release history ==
Date	Note
22 July 2002	
25 May 2009	Reissue

== Charts ==
Chart	Peak position
French Albums (SNEP)	146
German Albums (Offizielle Top 100)	83
Swedish Albums (Sverigetopplistan)	29
