= Live Damage =

Video by Dark Tranquillity
- Released: September 23, 2003
- Recorded: at Krzemionki Studio TVP, Kraków, Poland on October 7, 2002 Gagarin Club, Athens, Greece on October 20, 2002 Essen, Germany on November 13, 2002 La Locomotive, Paris, France on November 19, 2002
- Genre: Melodic death metal
- Length: 195 mins
- Label: Century Media

Dark Tranquillity album chronology
Damage Done (2002)	Live Damage (2003)	Exposures - In Retrospect and Denial (2004)

Live Damage is the first live album by Swedish melodic death metal band Dark Tranquillity. It contains an approximately 85-minute-long live show recorded in Krzemionki Studio TVP, Kraków, Poland on October 7, 2002. The DVD is from their Damage Done tour.

Bonus material on the disc includes bootleg recordings from Essen, Athens and Paris, an interview with the band, their biography and individual members' profiles, Band biography, discography, photo gallery, art gallery, desktop images, web links and two music videos.

== Track listing ==
Live Damage
No.	Title	Length
1.	"Intro"	4:12
2.	"The Wonders at Your Feet"	3:45
3.	"The Treason Wall"	3:37
4.	"Hedon"	4:34
5.	"White Noise/Black Silence"	4:03
6.	"Haven"	3:57
7.	"Punish My Heaven"	5:06
8.	"Monochromatic Stains"	3:52
9.	"Undo Control"	4:56
10.	"Indifferent Suns"	3:34
11.	"Format C: For Cortex"	4:30
12.	"Insanity's Crescendo"	5:39
13.	"Hours Passed in Exile"	4:45
14.	"The Sun Fired Blanks"	4:36
15.	"Damage Done"	3:22
16.	"Lethe"	4:03
17.	"Not Built to Last"	3:54
18.	"Thereln"	5:37
19.	"Zodijackyl Light"	4:02
20.	"Final Resistance"	3:05
21.	"Outro - Ex Nihilo"	0:51

== Bonus material ==
Live in Essen (One Camera Bootleg Video Footage Recordings):

No.	Title	Length
1.	"White Noise/Black Silence"
2.	"Haven"
3.	"The Wonders at Your Feet"
4.	"Final Resistance"

Live in *Athens/**Paris (Bootleg Songs):

No.	Title	Length
1.	"ThereIn*"
2.	"Zodijackyl Light*"
3.	"Final Resistance*"
4.	"Damage Done**"
5.	"The Wonders at Your Feet**"
6.	"Final Resistance**"
7.	"Punish My Heaven*"
8.	"Monochromatic Stains*"
9.	"ThereIn**"
10.	"Haven*"
11.	"Hedon**"
12.	"White Noise/Black Silence*"

Bonus Videos:

No.	Title	Length
1.	"Monochromatic Stains" (Video Clip)
2.	"ThereIn" (Video Clip)

== Track Information ==
From Live Damage

- Track 1 is from Live Damage
- Track 2, 6, 10 & 17 are from Haven
- Track 3, 5, 8, 11, 13, 15, 20 & 21 are from Damage Done
- Track 4, 12 & 19 are from The Mind's I
- Track 7 & 16 are from The Gallery
- Track 9, 14 & 18 is from Projector

== Credits ==
=== Dark Tranquillity ===
- Mikael Stanne - vocals
- Niklas Sundin - guitar, art direction and design
- Martin Henriksson - guitar
- Anders Jivarp - drums
- Michael Nicklasson - bass
- Martin Brändström - electronics

=== Guests ===
Essen filming

- Zeche Carl
- Marcel "King of Crange" Denghaus

Athens filming

- John Hiotellis
- George Kotios

Art Direction and Design

- Tomasz "Dziuba" Dziubiński
- Joerg Lindermann

Show arrangements in Athens

- Makis Naskos
- Harry Katinakis
- Omicron Music
- Marius Karlsen

Paris filming

- Marius Karlsen

Photography

- Andrzej Glue
- Volker Beushausen
