= The Gallery (album) =

Studio album by Dark Tranquillity
- Released: 27 November 1995
- Recorded: April–May 1995
- Studio: Studio Fredman, Gothenburg
- Genre: Melodic death metal
- Length: 47:48
- Label: Osmose
- Producer: Dark Tranquillity, Fredrik Nordström

Dark Tranquillity chronology
| Of Chaos and Eternal Night (1995) | The Gallery (1995) | Enter Suicidal Angels (1996) |

Professional ratings
Review scores
| Source | Rating |
|---|---|
| AllMusic | 4.5/5 stars |
| Sputnikmusic | 5/5 stars |

The Gallery is the second studio album by Swedish melodic death metal band Dark Tranquillity, released on 27 November 1995 by Osmose. It was the first full-length release to feature Mikael Stanne on lead vocals, as he was previously the rhythm guitarist and backing vocalist.

In 2004, The Gallery was re-released with a slightly different cover art and five cover songs as bonus tracks.

== Songs ==
On the band's live album, Where Death Is Most Alive, vocalist Mikael Stanne has stated that the song "Edenspring" is about drinking.

Live versions of songs on The Gallery have been recorded for the band's live albums: "Punish My Heaven" and "Lethe" are featured on the Live Damage album. "Edenspring", "Lethe" and "Punish My Heaven" are featured on the Where Death Is Most Alive album.

== Live performances ==
When the band plays songs from "The Gallery" live, they tune down to their usual D♭ tuning, rather than E♭ tuning, which was the tuning for this album and Haven.

- "Punish My Heaven" has been played very often since its release.
- "Lethe" has also been played often since the release of "The Gallery".
  - Most of the song's intro is cut out. During the band's earlier tours, the intro has been played on bass. However, the band has shifted to playing the intro on a keyboard.
- "Edenspring" was often played during shows during the tours of The Gallery and The Mind's I. It returned to the band's setlist during the "Where Death is Most Alive Tour".
- "The Gallery" was played in a few shows during the "Projector" and "Haven" tours. It returned to the band's setlist during the touring cycle for We Are the Void.
- "Silence, and the Firmament Withdrew" was played during many shows in the touring cycle for The Gallery. It was also in during a few shows during the Haven touring cycle. It returned to the band's setlist during the European Leg of the Construct tour.
- "The Dividing Line" was played in a few shows during The Gallery Tour.

== Critical reception ==
The Gallery is considered a classic album of the Gothenburg style of metal, along with At the Gates' Slaughter of the Soul and In Flames' The Jester Race, exhibiting the dual guitar leads, growled vocals and acoustic sections typical of the genre.

John Serba, writing for AllMusic, wrote that the album "is a transcendent work from one of the underdogs of the genre -- a bona fide masterpiece that helped further stretch the boundaries of death metal in the '90s."

This album was inducted into Decibel magazine's hall of fame in its April 2010 issue. Chris Dick, in the article accompanying the induction, stated that "no recording at the time or since bears resemblance to its power and sophistication."

== Track listing ==
| No. | Title | Lyrics | Music | Length |
|---|---|---|---|---|
| 1. | "Punish My Heaven" | Stanne, Sundin | Johansson, Sundin, Jivarp | 4:46 |
| 2. | "Silence, and the Firmament Withdrew" | Sundin, Stanne | Sundin, Henriksson | 2:36 |
| 3. | "Edenspring" | Stanne | Sundin, Johansson | 4:30 |
| 4. | "The Dividing Line" | Stanne | Jivarp, Johansson, Sundin | 5:01 |
| 5. | "The Gallery" | Stanne, Sundin | Henriksson | 4:07 |
| 6. | "The One Brooding Warning" | Stanne | Henriksson, Johansson, Sundin | 4:14 |
| 7. | "Midway Through Infinity" | Stanne | Sundin, Jivarp, Henriksson, Johansson | 3:30 |
| 8. | "Lethe" | Sundin | Henriksson | 4:42 |
| 9. | "The Emptiness from Which I Fed" | Stanne | Henriksson, Sundin, Johansson | 5:43 |
| 10. | "Mine Is the Grandeur..." (instrumental) | | Henriksson, Sundin | 2:26 |
| 11. | "...of Melancholy Burning" | Stanne | Henriksson | 6:16 |
| Total length: | | | | 47:48 |

Japanese edition bonus track
| No. | Title | Writer(s) | Length |
|---|---|---|---|
| 12. | "My Friend of Misery (Metallica cover)" | James Hetfield, Jason Newsted, Lars Ulrich | 5:25 |

10" box
| No. | Title | Length |
|---|---|---|
| 12. | "Bringer of Torture" (Kreator cover) | 2:20 |
| 13. | "Sacred Reich" (Sacred Reich cover) | 3:12 |

2004 re-release
| No. | Title | Length |
|---|---|---|
| 12. | "Bringer of Torture" (Kreator cover) | 2:20 |
| 13. | "Sacred Reich" (Sacred Reich cover) | 3:12 |
| 14. | "22 Acacia Avenue" (Iron Maiden cover) | 6:05 |
| 15. | "Lady in Black" (Mercyful Fate cover) | 4:22 |
| 16. | "My Friend of Misery" (Metallica cover) | 5:25 |

== Personnel ==
=== Dark Tranquillity ===
- Mikael Stanne − vocals
- Niklas Sundin − guitar
- Fredrik Johansson − guitar, acoustic guitar (track 1)
- Martin Henriksson − bass, acoustic and clean guitar (tracks 2, 3, 5 and 10)
- Anders Jivarp − drums

=== Guests ===
- Eva-Marie Larsson − co-vocals on "The Gallery", "Lethe" and "...of Melancholy Burning"
- Frasse Franzén − timpani on "Mine Is the Grandeur..."
- Fredrik Nordström − keyboards
- Kristian Wåhlin − cover art
