= Endtime Signals =

Studio album by Dark Tranquillity
- Released: 16 August 2024
- Recorded: 2023–2024
- Studios: Rogue Music; Fascination Street Studios; Nacksving Studios
- Genre: Melodic death metal
- Length: 50:24
- Label: Century Media
- Producer: Martin Brändström

Dark Tranquillity chronology
Moment (2020)	Endtime Signals (2024)

Singles from Endtime Signals
- 1. "The Last Imagination" Released: 8 March 2024; 2. "Unforgivable" Released: 2 May 2024; 3. "Not Nothing" Released: 21 June 2024

Endtime Signals is the thirteenth studio album by Swedish melodic death metal band Dark Tranquillity, released on 16 August 2024 by Century Media Records. The album is the band's first to feature bassist Christian Jansson and drummer Joakim Strandberg Nilsson, who replaced longtime members Anders Iwers and Anders Jivarp after the latter two left the band in August 2021. The album features two songs co-written by two former band-members, one by the late Fredrik Johansson and the other by Niklas Sundin. The album also marks the band's return to recording as a five-piece after the previous album, Moment, was recorded as a six-piece.

Professional ratings
Review scores
Source	Rating
Blabbermouth	8/10
Louder Sound	3.5/5 stars
Metal Injection	8.5/10
MetalSucks	4/5 stars

== Track listing ==
All lyrics are written by Mikael Stanne; all music is composed by Johan Reinholdz and Martin Brändström, except where noted.

Standard edition track listing
No.	Title	Music	Length
1.	"Shivers and Voids"	Reinholdz	3:48
2.	"Unforgivable"	Reinholdz	3:44
3.	"Neuronal Fire"		4:32
4.	"Not Nothing"		4:53
5.	"Drowned Out Voices"		3:54
6.	"One of Us Is Gone"		4:37
7.	"The Last Imagination"		3:46
8.	"Enforced Perspective"		3:20
9.	"Our Disconnect"		5:19
10.	"Wayward Eyes"		3:29
11.	"A Bleaker Sun"	Reinholdz	4:23
12.	"False Reflection"	Niklas Sundin; Brändström; Reinholdz	4:42
Total length:			50:24

Deluxe bonus tracks
No.	Title	Length
13.	"Zero Sum"	3:47
14.	"In Failure"	4:28
Total length:		59:39

== Personnel ==
Dark Tranquillity

- Mikael Stanne – vocals
- Johan Reinholdz – guitars
- Christian Jansson – bass
- Martin Brändström – keyboards, programming
- Joakim Strandberg Nilsson – drums

Additional personnel

- Johannes Bergion – cello (track 6)
- Sofia Högstadius – violin, viola (track 6)
- Martin Brändström – production
- Alexander Backlund – recording (drums)
- Anders Lagerfors – assistant production
- Jonatan Thomasson – assistant production
- Johan Martin – assistant mixing
- Jens Bogren – mixing, mastering
- Tony Lindgren – mastering (vinyl)
- Niklas Sundin – artwork, layout
- Krichan Wihlborg – photography

== Charts ==
Chart performance for Endtime Signals
Chart (2024)	Peak position
Austrian Albums (Ö3 Austria)	7
Belgian Albums (Ultratop Flanders)	188
Belgian Albums (Ultratop Wallonia)	122
Croatian International Albums (HDU)	25
Finnish Albums (Suomen virallinen lista)	15
French Albums (SNEP)	105
German Albums (Offizielle Top 100)	6
Japanese Albums (Oricon)	47
Japanese Hot Albums (Billboard Japan)	48
Swedish Albums (Sverigetopplistan)	13
Swiss Albums (Schweizer Hitparade)	5
UK Album Downloads (Official Charts)	67
UK Rock & Metal Albums (Official Charts)	8
