= Construct (Dark Tranquillity album) =

Studio album by Dark Tranquillity
- Released: 27 May 2013
- Recorded: February 2013
- Genre: Melodic death metal
- Length: 42:21
- Label: Century Media
- Producer: Jens Bogren, Dark Tranquillity

Dark Tranquillity chronology
We Are the Void (2010)	Construct (2013)	Atoma (2016)

Alternative cover
- US edition

Alternative cover
- LP edition

Construct is the tenth studio album by Swedish melodic death metal band Dark Tranquillity. It was released on 27 May 2013 through Century Media Records. A music video for "Uniformity", directed by Patric Ullaeus, was released on 10 May 2013. The album was written during what the band described as their "darkest period" and drew critical praise for its melodrama and darkness. Construct would be the band's last studio album with founding member guitarist Martin Henriksson as he left the band in early 2016 due to loss of passion for playing music.

At 42 minutes, Construct is Dark Tranquillity's shortest studio album to date.

== Background ==
Prior to recording the music for Construct, bassist Daniel Antonsson departed on amicable terms and guitarist Martin Henriksson (who originally played bass for Dark Tranquillity before switching to guitars beginning with Projector in 1999) filled in for the recording session. Mikael Stanne described Antonsson as "a great guy and an awesome musician" but acknowledged that he was not "on the same page" as the rest of the band due to his desire to be "like a band leader. He wants to be the one in charge, but there's no way to be in charge in our band [as] we're all democratic and close to each other after playing together for so long". Two songs, "Sorrow's Architect" and "A Memory Construct", were recorded during the making of this album, but were instead released on the "A Memory Construct" limited tour single.

== Lyrics ==
Stanne noted from where both the lyrical themes and the album title originated:

[T]he stuff that angers me the most[, which is] the narrow-mindedness and biased will to not see things as they are...I wish we could be more honest with ourselves and see things more clearly and be more rational...Over the years I've gotten more upset about this and that got me thinking about what motivates and drives us to believe the things we believe. The big theme is the ultimate construct of religion and faith. The title is Construct in a most negative way: this shield or excuse we have to do the things we do.

In another interview, Stanne said "I want people to be sceptical and be able to think for themselves. The herd type of behaviour of many I find quite disturbing...I like people to be pure and unbiased and free any preconceptions when they encounter other people. The utter ignorance and bigotry of some people really gets to me".

Niklas Sundin elaborated that "Our brains have evolved to find patterns and connections where there are none, but – as they say – extraordinary claims require extraordinary evidence. I rarely want to talk about non-musical stuff in interviews, but as a science buff and skeptic I have to take the opportunity to recommend every UFO or conspiracy theorist to read Carl Sagan's The Demon Haunted World".

== Songwriting ==
The songwriting process departed from Dark Tranquillity's typical method. Henriksson reduced his role in arranging the songs, while keyboardist Martin Brandstrom, guitarist Niklas Sundin, and drummer Anders Jivarp served as the principal songwriting team. Stanne commented about this method:

[It] was totally different from what we normally do...It was an experiment at first, but then it turned into this really creative thing. We were all really excited. We could talk and be more objective about the songs and what they needed and what the album should be like. It was so liberating. Finally, we could make music and not argue about it too much. It was a very positive experience.

Stanne attributed the album's sharp departure from previous albums to the band's struggle with "writer's block" and the alternate songwriting configuration that eventually enabled the band to create the new album: "The material we had was pretty emotional. It was written during this period where we were struggling...Most of the material was emotional and sad and heavy. That's what the album became. The stuff we wrote during our darkest period was put together in the most creative way we had done in many years." Their previous album, We Are the Void had not been as positively received as their previous albums, and the group had experienced troubles in the creation of the album, such as in-fighting.

The band commented on the style of the album, saying, "While still bearing the unmistakable mark of the Dark Tranquillity, the record is probably our most different and diverse offering since 1999's Projector". Mikael Stanne described the album as being both "melody driven" and a "reaction" to the band's recent work.

Chad Bowar of About.com noted "the darkness and sadness in the composition of many of the songs", which he attributed to the more collaborative songwriting approach. However, Sundin stated in an interview that "Most likely, the upcoming 500 years will be a patchwork of great tragedy and suffering as well as major advance and improvement, just like the past 500 years have been. But metal lyrics are often about polarizing. You don't sing about being mildly skeptical of a certain amount of people behaving in a slightly disagreeable way and that you would prefer if they please could consider changing their behavior. You sing about throwing the whole of humanity in a sea of fire and brimstone and laughing while doing it".

== Reception ==
Professional ratings
Review scores
Source	Rating
About.com	4/5 stars
AllMusic	4/5 stars
Decibel	9/10 stars
Sputnikmusic	3.6/5

Describing the band as "legendary", Chad Bowar of About.com remarked, "it's no surprise that Dark Tranquillity has delivered another quality album with Construct. It's one of their most creative and diverse releases in quite a few years." James Christopher Monger of Allmusic noted that the album pulled back on the intensity in favour of an approach that "retains the chilly elegance of the band's best work while dialing back on the more punishing aspects, resulting in an expansive, world-weary, and windswept racket".

Kyle Ward of Sputnikmusic compared Construct with the band's 1999 album Projector, due to the character of the experimentation, and praised the album's atmosphere as "the most palpable and poignant of their entire discography, due in large part to its focus on dark, melodramatic tones in the synths and the swift, tight melodies that make up the guitar leads".

On 15 June 2013 the album entered the US Billboard 200 chart at number 171.

== Track listing ==
All lyrics written by Mikael Stanne.

Standard edition
No.	Title	Music	Length
1.	"For Broken Words"	Anders Jivarp, Martin Brändström	4:34
2.	"The Science of Noise"	Jivarp, Brändström, Martin Henriksson	3:45
3.	"Uniformity"	Jivarp, Brändström, Niklas Sundin	5:30
4.	"The Silence in Between"	Jivarp, Henriksson, Brändström	3:32
5.	"Apathetic"	Sundin	3:29
6.	"What Only You Know"	Brändström	4:01
7.	"Endtime Hearts"	Sundin	3:58
8.	"State of Trust"	Brändström	4:06
9.	"Weight of the End"	Jivarp, Brändström, Sundin	4:55
10.	"None Becoming"	Brändström	4:31
Total length:			42:21

Limited edition and US edition bonus tracks
No.	Title	Music	Length
11.	"Immemorial"	Jivarp, Brändström, Sundin	5:04
12.	"Photon Dreams" (Instrumental)	Sundin, Brändström	2:03
Total length:			49:28

Japan bonus tracks
No.	Title	Note	Length
11.	"Immemorial"		5:04
12.	"Photon Dreams"	^{Note 1}	2:03
13.	"To Where Fires Cannot Feed"	^{Note 2}	3:52
14.	"The Bow and the Arrow"	^{Note 2}	3:55
15.	"Zero Distance"	^{Note 3}	4:30
16.	"Zero Distance *"	^{Note 4}	4:02
Total length:			63:07

Deluxe edition bonus disc
No.	Title	Length
1.	"The Treason Wall" (Live in Milan 2008)	3:53
2.	"The New Build" (Live in Milan 2008)	4:28
3.	"Focus Shift" (Live in Milan 2008)	3:59
4.	"The Lesser Faith" (Live in Milan 2008)	4:48
5.	"The Wonders at Your Feet" (Live in Milan 2008)	4:25
6.	"Lost to Apathy" (Live in Milan 2008)	4:54
7.	"Misery's Crown" (Live in Milan 2008)	4:34
8.	"ThereIn" (Live in Milan 2008)	6:23
9.	"My Negation" (Live in Milan 2008)	6:08
10.	"The Mundane and the Magic" (Live in Milan 2008)	5:53
11.	"Final Resistance" (Live in Milan 2008)	3:49
12.	"Terminus (Where Death Is Most Alive)" (Live in Milan 2008)	6:05
13.	"Dream Oblivion" (Live at With Full Force 2010)	4:17
14.	"Iridium" (Live at Summerbreeze 2010)	5:19
Total length:		65:57

=== Notes ===
1. ^Note 1 That song is an instrumental.
2. ^Note 2 That song is from the We Are the Void reissue.
3. ^Note 3 That song is from the We Are the Void reissue and the Zero Distance EP.
4. ^Note 4 That song is a Radio Edit version of its original song.

== Personnel ==
=== Dark Tranquillity ===
- Mikael Stanne – vocals
- Niklas Sundin – lead guitar; album artwork
- Martin Henriksson – rhythm guitar; bass guitar, music composition (2, & 4)
- Martin Brändström – keyboard
- Anders Jivarp – drums

=== Additional personnel ===
- Jens Bogren – mixing
