= Atoma (album) =

Studio album by Dark Tranquillity
- Released: 4 November 2016
- Recorded: 2016
- Genre: Melodic death metal
- Length: 49:33
- Label: Century Media
- Producer: Martin Brändström

Dark Tranquillity chronology
Construct (2013)	Atoma (2016)	Moment (2020)

Professional ratings
Review scores
Source	Rating
Cutting Edge	4/5 stars
Exclaim!	5/10
Gaffa	5/6
Inferno	4/5 stars
laut.de	4/5 stars
Magazyn Gitarzysta	9/10
Metal Hammer Germany	6/7
Metal Hammer UK	3/5 stars
Plattentests.de	7/10
Powermetal.de	9/10
Rock Hard	7.5/10
Soundi	3/5 stars

Atoma is the eleventh studio album by Swedish melodic death metal band Dark Tranquillity. It was released on 4 November 2016 through Century Media Records. Atoma is the band's first studio album with bassist Anders Iwers, who replaced founding member Martin Henriksson (also the rhythm guitarist), after Henriksson left the band in early 2016 due to loss of passion for playing music. Atoma is the last release to feature founding lead guitarist Niklas Sundin, who would depart from the band in March 2020.

Two songs, "The Absolute" and "Time Out of Place", were recorded during the making of this album, but were released on a bonus disc in the limited edition. These songs are softer, darker and more brooding with only clean singing, reminiscent of bands such as Katatonia and the later Opeth. Another song, "Reconstruction Time Again", was released as a Japanese edition bonus track. It is a nine-minute electro-industrial medley of the songs "State of Trust", "None Becoming", and "Uniformity" from the Construct album.

== Track listing ==
Standard edition
No.	Title	Music	Length
1.	"Encircled"	Martin Brändström	3:32
2.	"Atoma"	Anders Jivarp	4:19
3.	"Forward Momentum"	Jivarp	3:40
4.	"Neutrality"	Jivarp	4:17
5.	"Force of Hand"	Jivarp; Niklas Sundin	4:23
6.	"Faithless by Default"	Brändström; Sundin	4:30
7.	"The Pitiless"	Jivarp	4:08
8.	"Our Proof of Life"	Sundin	4:22
9.	"Clearing Skies"	Brändström	3:33
10.	"When the World Screams"	Jivarp	3:57
11.	"Merciless Fate"	Brändström	4:22
12.	"Caves and Embers"	Sundin	4:30
Total length:			49:33

Limited edition bonus CD
No.	Title	Music	Length
1.	"The Absolute"	Jivarp	5:15
2.	"Time Out of Place"	Jivarp	3:39
Total length:			8:54

Limited edition bonus CD (Japan)
No.	Title	Music	Length
3.	"Reconstruction Time Again" (instrumental)	Brändström	9:15
Total length:			18:09

== Credits ==
=== Dark Tranquillity ===
- Mikael Stanne – lead vocals; lyrics
- Niklas Sundin – guitars; album artwork, page layout
- Anders Iwers – bass
- Martin Brändström – electronics
- Anders Jivarp – drums

=== Additional personnel ===
- Dirk Behlau – photography
- Annelie Johansson – backing vocals on "Forward Momentum"
- Björn Gelotte – guitar solo on "Force of Hand"
- Jens Bogren – mastering
- David Castillo – mixing, mastering
- Linus Corneliusson – mixing assistance

== Charts ==
Chart	Peak position
Austrian Albums (Ö3 Austria)	40
Belgian Albums (Ultratop Flanders)	80
Belgian Albums (Ultratop Wallonia)	88
French Albums (SNEP)	108
German Albums (Offizielle Top 100)	23
Italian Albums (FIMI)	47
Japanese Albums (Oricon)	64
Swedish Albums (Sverigetopplistan)	2
Swiss Albums (Schweizer Hitparade)	36
UK Rock & Metal Albums (OCC)	28
