= Supreme Majesty =

Swedish power metal band

Supreme Majesty was a Swedish power metal band.

The band was founded in Kristianstad in 1999. By their first album their lineup consisted of singer Joakim Olsson, guitarist Rille Svensson, guitarist and keyboardist Christian Andersson, bassist Daniel Andersson and drummer Joakim "Jocke" Unger. All members had dayjobs, and the band practiced in a school basement in Kristianstad. The band was signed by Massacre Records. In 2003, guitarist Tobias Wernersson was added to the band, at the same time as the release of Danger, but after its recording. In 2004, the band changed drummers from Jocke Unger to Johan Rydberg, in time for the recording of Elements of Creation.

Chrille Andersson left in the summer of 2005. The group continued to add new members, first keyboardist Mattias Holmgren, followed by bassist Håkan Nyander in early 2006 and guitarist Jimmy Hedlund of Falconer in the fall of 2006. Rille Svensson left in the fall of 2007, leaving only Joakim Olsson from the lineup of the debut album.

== Discography ==
- Tales of a Tragic Kingdom (2001)
- Danger (2003)
- Elements of Creation (2005)
