= Dark Tranquillity =

Swedish melodic death metal band

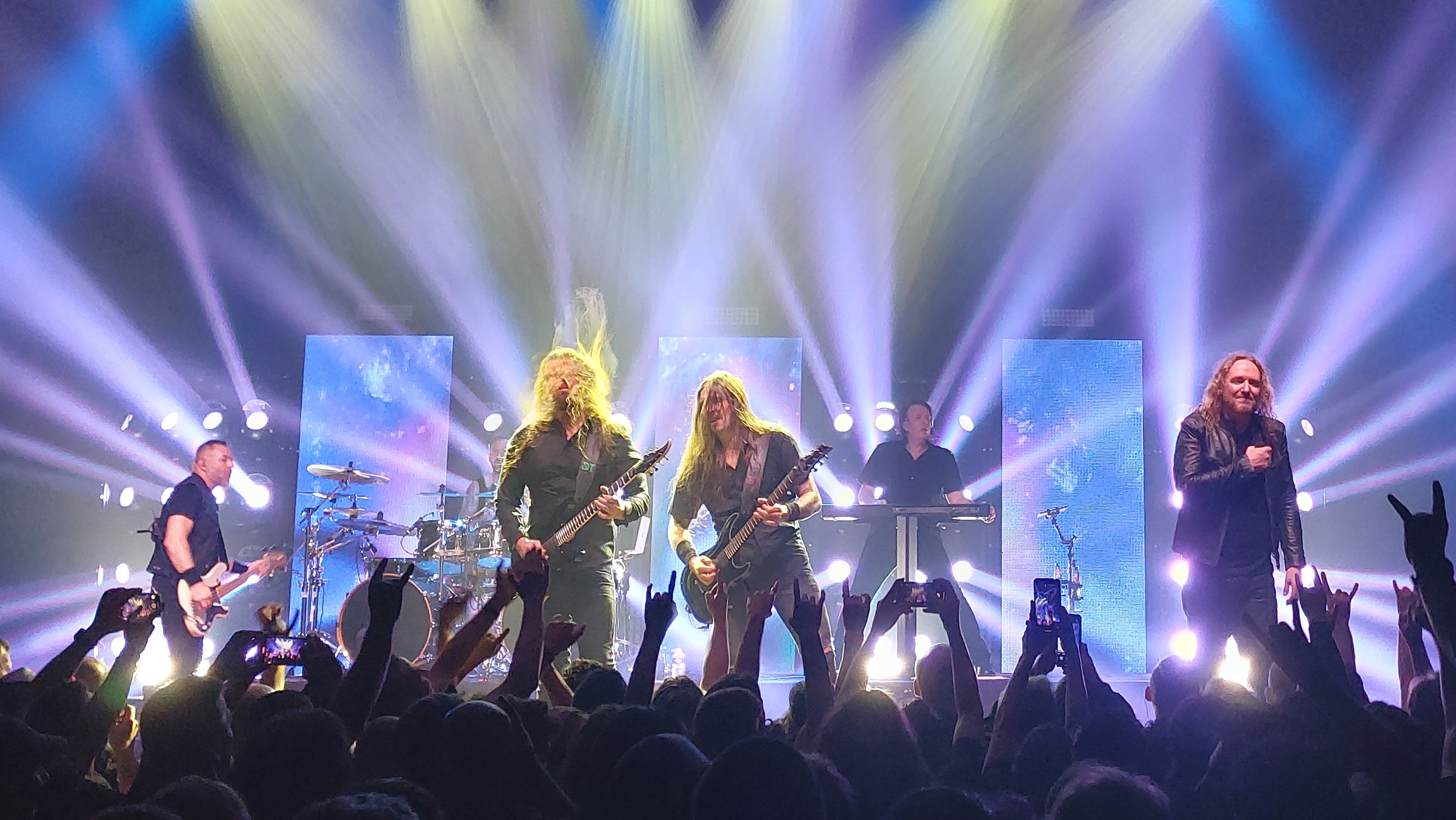
- Dark Tranquillity in 2024

Background information
- Also known as: Septic Broiler (1989–1990)
- Origin: Billdal, Gothenburg, Sweden
- Genre: Melodic death metal
- Years active: 1989–present
- Labels: Slaughter (1992–1993); Carnage (1993–1994); Spinefarm (1993–1994); Osmose (1994–1998); Metal Invader (1998); Century Media (1998–present)
- Members: Mikael Stanne; Martin Brändström; Johan Reinholdz; Christian Jansson; Joakim Strandberg Nilsson; Peter Lyse Karmark
- Past members: Anders Jivarp; Niklas Sundin; Martin Henriksson; Anders Fridén; Fredrik Johansson; Mikael Niklasson; Daniel Antonsson; Anders Iwers; Christopher Amott
- Website: darktranquillity.com

Dark Tranquillity are a Swedish melodic death metal band from Gothenburg, formed in 1989. They are considered pioneers of the Gothenburg metal scene, which includes bands such as At the Gates and In Flames. After a nearly three-decade long collaboration of four founding members, frequent lineup changes between 2015-2021 have left vocalist Mikael Stanne as the only original member, together with long-time keyboardist Martin Brändström. The current lineup consists of Stanne (vocals), Brändström (keyboards, electronics), Johan Reinholdz (lead guitar), Peter Lyse Karmak (rhythm guitar), Christian Jansson (bass), and Joakim Strandberg Nilsson (drums).

== History ==
=== Early years and Skydancer (1989–1993) ===
Guitarists Mikael Stanne and Niklas Sundin, vocalist Anders Fridén, drummer Anders Jivarp, and bassist Martin Henriksson formed Dark Tranquillity in 1989 as Septic Broiler. In 1990, the band recorded the demo Enfeebled Earth. The band renamed to Dark Tranquillity shortly after.

In August 1993, the band released their debut album, Skydancer. Soon after, vocalist Anders Fridén left the band and joined fellow Gothenburg band In Flames. Guitarist Mikael Stanne assumed the position of lead vocalist, and Fredrik Johansson was recruited to take over second guitar.

=== The Gallery and The Mind's I (1994–1998) ===
In 1994, Dark Tranquillity covered "My Friend of Misery" for the Metallica tribute album Metal Militia − A Tribute to Metallica.

In 1995, the band released the EP Of Chaos and Eternal Night, which was followed by the release of their second studio album, The Gallery. The Gallery has been referred to as a masterpiece from the era.

Dark Tranquillity released their second EP, Enter Suicidal Angels, in November 1996. Their third album, The Mind's I, was released in April 1997, continuing further with the sound from The Gallery.

=== Projector and Haven (1999–2000) ===
In January 1999, Fredrik Johansson left the band, citing a desire to focus on his family and a more stable job. Bassist Martin Henriksson took over as second guitarist, and the band brought in Michael Niklasson on bass. Projector introduced piano, keyboard, and electronic parts into Dark Tranquillity's sound, so the band also added Martin Brändström on electronics.

Projector was released in June 1999, and was nominated for a Swedish Grammy Award. The album featured a major change in songwriting. While retaining growled vocals and their signature death metal sound, the band added pianos, baritone soft vocals, and verse-chorus structures to their sound, reflecting the band's goal to strive for different musical expressions. Around the same time, Skydancer and Of Chaos and Eternal Night were reissued together as Skydancer/Of Chaos and Eternal Night.

Haven was released a year later. It featured prominent electronics compared to previous releases. Like its predecessor, fans and critics gave Haven a mixed response. As the band toured in 2001, they hired Robin Engström to play live, due to Jivarp's commitments as a new father.

=== Damage Done and Character (2001–2005) ===
Dark Tranquillity released Damage Done in 2002, a return to a heavier direction with thicker guitar distortion, deep atmospheric keyboards, and abandoning soft vocals. They released the music video for the single "Monochromatic Stains", followed by the release of Live Damage, their first live DVD. In 2004, their compilation album Exposures – In Retrospect and Denial, featuring one disc with rare and unreleased tracks and another with live tracks, was released.

Character was the seventh release from Dark Tranquillity, in 2005, and was critically praised. It featured the fourth music video released by Dark Tranquillity, with the successful single "Lost to Apathy". After releasing the album, the band played live in Canada for the first time.

=== Fiction (2006–2009) ===
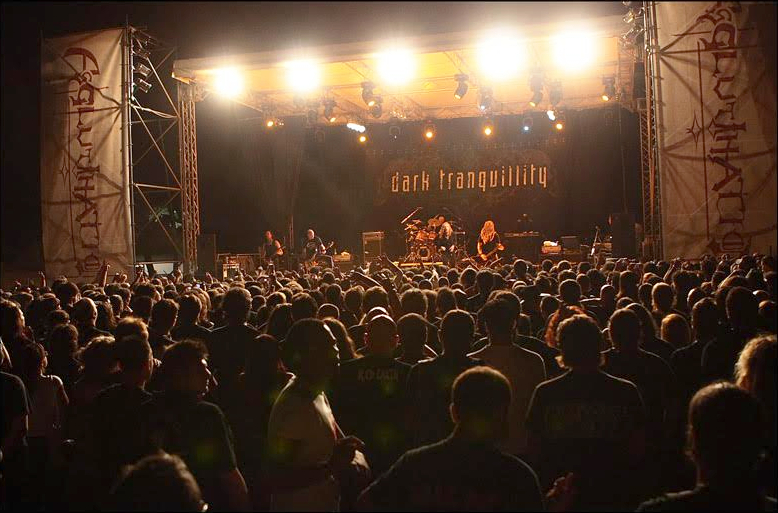
Dark Tranquillity headlining the Agglutination Metal Festival, 2008

In 2007, Fiction was released, in which Stanne returned to clean vocals. It included the first female guest vocalist since Projector. The album's writing combined the style of Projector and Haven with the more aggressive traits of Character and Damage Done. At this time, Dark Tranquillity toured with The Haunted, Into Eternity, and Scar Symmetry for the North America Metal for the Masses Tour. They toured the UK in early 2008 along with Omnium Gatherum. They returned to the US during spring 2008 with Arch Enemy. On the band's official website, they announced that bass guitarist Niklasson amicably left the band in August 2008 for personal reasons. On 19 September 2008, the band found a new bassist in Dimension Zero guitarist Daniel Antonsson, who also played guitar for Soilwork. On 25 May 2009, reissues of Projector, Haven, and Damage Done were released.

=== We Are the Void (2010–2011) ===
On 14 October 2009, Dark Tranquillity finished their ninth studio album. On 26 October 2009, they released the DVD Where Death Is Most Alive. On 30 October 2009, at the release party of the DVD, 333 copies were given away for free of the rare live album The Dying Fragments. On 21 December 2009, Dark Tranquillity released the song "Dream Oblivion", and on 14 January 2010, they released the song "At the Point of Ignition", from their ninth album, exclusively on their MySpace page. Their ninth album, We Are the Void, was released on 1 March 2010 in Europe and 2 March in the US. They opened for a US winter tour headlined by Killswitch Engage and joined by The Devil Wears Prada.

Dark Tranquillity headlined a North American tour in May–June 2010 with Threat Signal, Mutiny Within and The Absence. In February 2011, the band performed live at BITS Pilani Hyderabad Campus in Hyderabad, India.

=== Construct (2012–2013) ===
On 27 April 2012, Dark Tranquillity renewed their contract with Century Media. On 18 October 2012, the band began writing for the album. On 10 January 2013, the band announced the title of their tenth album would be Construct, and it was released in Europe on 27 May 2013 and in North America on 28 May 2013. The album was mixed by Jens Bogren at his Fascination Street studios in Örebro, Sweden.

On 18 February 2013, Antonsson amicably left Dark Tranquillity, citing a desire to focus on playing guitar and being a recording engineer and producer. On 27 February 2013, the band announced that they completed recording the album. Although Antonsson remained during the recording of "Construct", he did not perform the bass. According to Niklas Sundin's Twitter, he hadn't been excited for a Dark Tranquillity release since Skydancer, due to the recording sessions for all their other releases taking "way too long" compared to Construct.

On 27 March 2013, a teaser campaign and track list for Construct were revealed. The band commented on the style of the album, saying, "While still bearing the unmistakable mark of the Dark Tranquillity, the record is probably our most different and diverse offering since 1999's Projector".

To promote the album, the band toured the world with dates in Finland and North America alongside Omnium Gatherum, Europe with Tristania, and Sweden with Darkane.

On 10 July 2013, a B-side from Construct, "Sorrow's Architect", was released on a limited flexi 7" released with an issue of Decibel. On 14 January 2014, the band announced that the song would be released with another B-side, "A Memory Construct", on a limited tour 7" and digitally, which also includes the "Sorrow's Architect". The 7" became available on 1 February 2014, and digitally in March 2014.

=== Atoma (2014–2018) ===
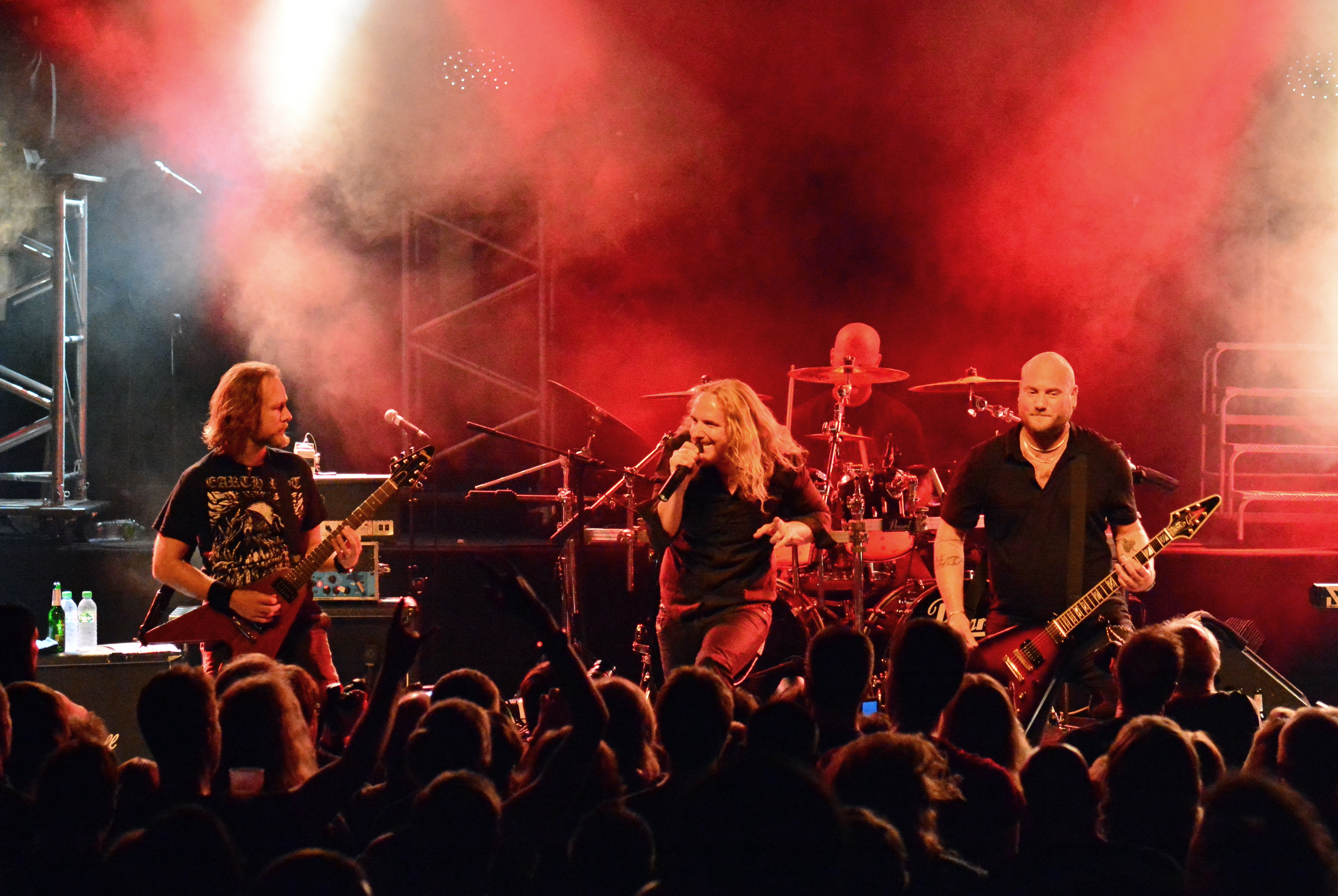
Dark Tranquillity at Hamburg Metal Dayz in 2014

In March 2016, guitarist Martin Henriksson announced his departure from the band, admitting he had "lost the passion for playing music" after 26 years. The band wished him the best in his future endeavors.

On 22 May 2016, Dark Tranquillity began recording their eleventh full-length album, Atoma, but did not officially announce it until 6 July. The album was released on 4 November 2016, via Century Media. In March 2017, the band released the song "The Absolute", recorded during the Atoma sessions, as a digital single. On 28 January 2018, Dark Tranquillity embarked on a European tour with main support band Equilibrium.

=== Moment and Endtime Signals (2019–present) ===
On 22 March 2020, Niklas Sundin announced his departure from the band on Dark Tranquillity's social media.

A week later, the band announced that they had started recording their new album, and that the two guitarists who had been touring with the band, since 2017, Christopher Amott and Johan Reinholdz, were named full-time members. The album, Moment, was released on 20 November 2020. As a preview, they released the singles "Phantom Days", "Identical to None", "The Dark Unbroken" and "Eyes Of The World" on 11 September, 16 October, 30 October and on 20 November 2020, respectively. Moment was awarded the 2021 Grammi for Hard Rock/Metal Album of the Year.

On 13 August 2021, Mikael Stanne announced the departure of original drummer Anders Jivarp and bassist Anders Iwers, leaving him as the only founding member. For their upcoming tour, bassist Christian Jansson and In Mourning drummer Joakim Strandberg Nilsson were asked to play as session musicians. Jansson and Strandberg Nilsson were announced as full-time band members in June 2023.

On 25 January 2022, former guitarist Fredrik Johansson died of cancer. On 23 July 2023, Christopher Amott announced his departure from the band. On 7 March 2024, the band released the song "The Last Imagination" and announced their thirteenth album, Endtime Signals, released on 16 August 2024.

== Band members ==
=== Current ===
- Mikael Stanne – lead vocals (1993–present), rhythm guitar, backing vocals (1989–1993)
- Martin Brändström – keyboards, programming (1998–present)
- Johan Reinholdz – lead guitar (2020–present; live 2017–2020)
- Christian Jansson – bass (2023–present; live 2021–2023)
- Joakim Strandberg Nilsson – drums (2023–present; live 2021–2023)
- Peter Lyse Karmark – rhythm guitar (2024–present)

== Discography ==
- Skydancer (1993)
- The Gallery (1995)
- The Mind's I (1997)
- Projector (1999)
- Haven (2000)
- Damage Done (2002)
- Character (2005)
- Fiction (2007)
- We Are the Void (2010)
- Construct (2013)
- Atoma (2016)
- Moment (2020)
- Endtime Signals (2024)
