= Niklas Sundin =

Swedish guitarist

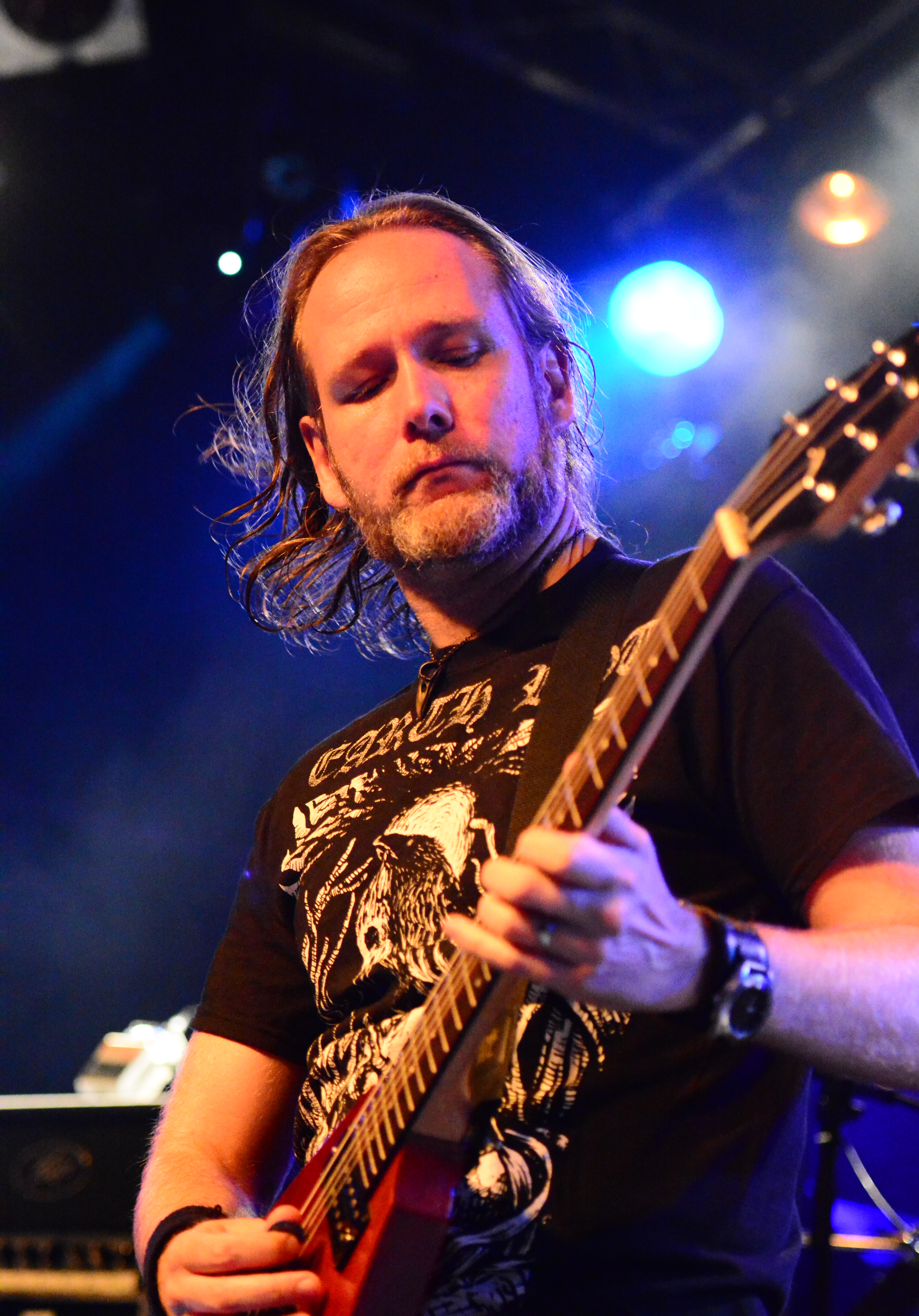
- Sundin performing in 2014

Background information
- Born: Niklas Bo Sundin; 13 August 1974 (age 52); Gothenburg, Sweden
- Genre: Melodic death metal
- Occupations: Musician; graphic designer; songwriter
- Instrument: Guitar
- Years active: 1989–present
- Member of: Mitochondrial Sun; Time and the Hunter
- Formerly of: Dark Tranquillity; Laethora
- Website: cabinfevermedia.com

Niklas Sundin (born 13 August 1974) is a Swedish musician, best known as a founding member and former lead guitarist of the melodic death metal band Dark Tranquillity from 1989–2020. In 2019, he founded his own band called Mitochondrial Sun, which has released three full-length studio albums to date. He is also a member of Time and the Hunter, a project founded in collaboration with Italian musician Enrico Longhin. He was a guitarist in the metal band Laethora from 2005–2010.

In Dark Tranquillity, he was one of only two members (the other being drummer Anders Jivarp) to maintain his role, unlike the other members who have or had switched. He also wrote some of the lyrics for the first three and recent two Dark Tranquillity albums (Lead singer Mikael Stanne wrote all of Dark Tranquillity's lyrics from Projector through Fiction) and In Flames' album The Jester Race, and continued to translate In Flames vocalist Anders Fridén's lyrics from Swedish to English for the next few albums while Anders worked to become more proficient in English. Although he quit Dark Tranquillity in 2016, it wasn't announced until March 2020.

Sundin is also the founder of Cabin Fever Media, which among other things creates artwork for metal bands. He recently published a book of independent artwork and sketches. He has done album layouts for bands such as In Flames, Eternal Tears of Sorrow, Meridian Dawn, Arch Enemy, Nightrage, Sentenced, Kryptos, and Fragments of Unbecoming, as well as his own bands.

== Equipment ==
His main guitars are Gibson Faded SG, Gibson 1983 Flying V, and an Ibanez IC400; he also uses a custom J. Nunis SC1, 2 Gibson Les Pauls (Standard and Gothic), and a Fender Talon I. He previously used Rocktron Chameleon rack mounted pre-amplifiers, but after the Damage Done tour, he and Martin Henriksson began using Peavey 5150 and Mesa/Boogie Dual Rectifier amplifiers along with Behringer V-AMP 2 modeling processors. In the making of We Are the Void, they are seen in the studio using a Peavey 6505, an ENGL Powerball, as well as a Bugera amplifier. He also endorses Mayones Guitars & Basses.

== Discography ==
=== With Dark Tranquility ===
- Skydancer (1993)
- The Gallery (1995)
- The Mind's I (1997)
- Projector (1999)
- Haven (2000)
- Damage Done (2002)
- Character (2005)
- Fiction (2007)
- We Are The Void (2010)
- Construct (2013)
- Atoma (2016)

=== With Laethora ===
- March of the Parasite (2007)
- The Light In Which We All Burn (2010)

=== With Mitochondrial Sun ===
- Mitochondrial Sun (2020)
- Sju Pulsarer (2020)
- Machine Dialectics (2025)

=== With Time and the Hunter ===
- Weapon pt.I (2025)

=== Solo ===
- Wattudragaren (2024)

=== Guest appearances ===
- Guitar solo in Sigh's song "In a Drowse" from Gallows Gallery (2006)

== Album covers ==
- ...And Oceans – A.M.G.O.D.
- Ablaze My Sorrow – Anger, Hate, Fury
- Adversary – Singularity
- Aephanemer – Know Thyself
- Aephanemer – Memento Mori
- Aephanemer – Prokopton
- Aephanemer – A Dream of Wilderness
- Ajattara – ITSE
- Ajattara – Kuolema
- Ajattara – Tyhjyys
- Agregator – A Semmi Ágán
- Agregator – Szürkület
- Alas – Absolute Purity
- Amethyst – Dea Noctilucae
- Amortis – Gift of Tongues
- Andromeda – Extension of the Wish
- Andromeda – Crescendo of Thoughts
- Andromeda – Chimera
- Arch Enemy – Wages of Sin, Burning Angel EP, Anthems of Rebellion, Dead Eyes See No Future EP, Live Doomsday DVD & Rise of the Tyrant
- Arise – The Godly Work of Art
- Arise – Kings of the Cloned Generation
- Armageddon – Embrace the Mystery
- As Memory Dies – Transmutate
- Atmaen – Canto Sagrado
- Autumnblaze – DämmerElbenTragödie
- Autumnblaze – Words are Not What They Seem
- Avariel – "The Dawn"
- Callenish Circle – Flesh Power Dominion
- Callenish Circle – My Passion // Your Pain
- Callenish Circle – Forbidden Empathy
- Ceremonial Oath – The Lost Name of God EP
- Charon – Tearstained
- Charon – Downhearted
- Charon – Little Angel EP
- Corporation 187 – Perfection in Pain
- Dark Age – s/t
- Dark Tranquillity – Haven
- Dark Tranquillity – Projector
- Dark Tranquillity – Skydancer/Of Chaos and Eternal Night
- Dark Tranquillity – Damage Done
- Dark Tranquillity – Exposures – In Retrospect and Denial
- Dark Tranquillity – Lost to Apathy
- Dark Tranquillity – Character
- Dark Tranquillity – Fiction
- Dark Tranquillity – We Are the Void
- Dark Tranquillity – Construct
- Dark Tranquillity – Atoma
- Dark Tranquillity – Moment
- Dark Tranquillity – Endtime Signals
- Dawn of Relic – Lovecraftian Dark
- Deadsoil – Sacrifice
- Detonation – An Epic Defiance
- Detonation – Portals to Uphobia
- Dimension Zero – Silent Night Fever
- Dimension Zero – This Is Hell
- Dominion Caligula – A New Era Rises
- Dragonland – Astronomy
- Dreamaker – Human Device
- Empyrium – Weiland
- Enforsaken – The Forever Endeavour
- Enter Chaos – Aura Sense
- Enter My Silence – Remotecontrolled Scythe
- Entwine – Gone
- Entwine – New Dawn (mcd)
- Eternal Tears of Sorrow – Chaotic Beauty
- Eternal Tears of Sorrow – A Virgin and a Whore
- Eternal Tears of Sorrow – The Last One for Life (EP)
- Ethereal Spawn – Ablaze in Viral Flames
- Eventide – Caress the Abstract (mcd)
- Eventide – Promo 2000
- Eventide – No Place Darker
- Eventide – Diaries from the Gallows
- Evilheart – Storm Of Annihilation
- Eyetrap – Folk Magic
- Fall – "The Insatiable Weakness"
- Fields of Asphodel – Deathflower (mcd)
- Flowing Tears – Jade
- Fragments of Unbecoming – Sterling Black Icon
- Gaia – Gaia
- Gardenian – Sindustries
- Gardenian – Soulburner
- Green Carnation – Journey to the End of the Night
- Green Carnation – Light of Day, Day of Darkness
- Green Carnation – The Quiet Offspring
- Harm – Devil
- Hypocrite – Edge of Existence
- In Flames – The Tokyo Showdown
- In Flames – Reroute to Remain
- In Flames – Trigger
- In Flames – Soundtrack to Your Escape
- In Flames – "The Quiet Place"
- Jeremy – Edge on the History
- Jeremy – The 2nd Advent
- Kang in O – s/t
- Kayser – Frame the World...Hang on the Wall
- Kerozene – Kerozene
- Kiuas – The New Dark Age
- Kryptos – Spiral Ascent
- Lacrimas Produndere – Ave End
- Last Tribe – The Uncrowned
- Laethora – March of the Parasite
- Lahmia – Into The Abyss
- Lost Horizon – Awakening the World
- Love in the Time of Cholera – The Sun Through Glass
- Luciferion – The Apostate
- Lullacry – Be My God
- Madrigal – Enticed (EP)
- Madrigal – I Die You Soar
- Mercenary – 11 Dreams
- Mercenary – Architect of Lies
- Miscellany – Catch-22
- Mirrored Mind – At Meridian
- Moonshine – Eternal
- Moonsorrow – Suden Uni
- Mourning Caress – Escape
- My Blood Is Fire – The End of Innocence
- Mörk Gryning – Maelstrom Chaos
- Naglfar – Sheol
- Narcissus – Crave and Collapse
- Nightrage – Sweet Vengeance
- Novembre – Classica
- Opposite Sides – Soul Mechanics
- Passenger – Passenger
- Passenger – In Reverse (EP)
- Pathos – Katharsis
- Red Aim – Niagara
- Rockateers – Louder Than Ever (EP)
- Sanctus – Aeon Sky
- Samadhi – Incandescence
- Satanic Slaughter – Banished to the Underworld
- Scaar – The Second Incision
- Scylla – Mater Dolorosa
- Sentenced – Crimson
- Sentenced – Killing Me, Killing You (EP)
- Shadownation – Promo 2001
- Silence – Enola
- Silence – The P/O/U/R Letters
- Skyfall – Skyfall
- Sleeping X – Sleeping X (demo EP)
- Soultorn – Masks
- Spiritual Beggars – Demons
- Sunset Sphere – Storm Before Silence
- Supreme Majesty – Tales of a Tragic Kingdom
- Supreme Majesty – Danger
- Tactile Gemma – Tactile Gemma
- The Crest – Letters from Fire
- The Forsaken – Traces of the Past
- The Moor – Jupiter's Immigrants
- The Moor – Emissaries (single)
- The Moor – Wrath of Vultures (single)
- The Moor – Ombra
- The More I See – The More I See
- Thundra – Blood of Your Soul
- Thyrane – Hypnotic
- Thyrfing – Vansinnesvisor
- Time and the Hunter – Weapon pt.I
- Time Requiem – The Inner Circle of Reality
- Turisas – Battle Metal
- Underthreat – Deathmosphere
- Urban Tales – Signs of Times
- Various Artists – No Fashion Classics
- Veneficum – Enigma Prognosis
- Vermin – Filthy Fucking Vermin
- Witchery – Symphony for the Devil (US version)
- Within Y – Extended Mental Dimensions
- Wolf – Wolf (German edition)
- Wolf – Moonshine (EP)
