= Projector (Dark Tranquillity album) =

Studio album by Dark Tranquillity
- Released: 10 August 1999
- Recorded: September 1998; Studio Fredman
- Genre: Melodic death metal; gothic metal
- Length: 54:23
- Label: Century Media
- Producer: Fredrik Nordström

Dark Tranquillity chronology
The Mind's I (1997)	Projector (1999)	Haven (2000)

Alternative cover
- Japanese edition cover

Professional ratings
Review scores
Source	Rating
AllMusic	3/5 stars
Sputnikmusic	3/5 stars

Projector (stylized : projector, or on the reissue p.r.o.j.e.c.t.o.r.) is the fourth studio album by Swedish melodic death metal band Dark Tranquillity. It is the final Dark Tranquillity album to feature guitarist Fredrik Johansson.

== Lineup change ==
In January 1999, with the album recorded months prior, and its release months ahead, Johansson and Dark Tranquillity mutually split, due to Johansson wanting to focus on his family and his day job. Bassist Martin Henriksson replaced Johansson on guitar, and Michael Nicklasson joined the band afterward, taking Henriksson's former position on bass guitar.

The introduction of piano, keyboards, and electronics — and their desire to integrate these elements into its sound — led the band to hire Martin Brändström as a full-time keyboardist. With the lineup, they played live bonus tracks of the reissue of this album and filmed a music video for "ThereIn".

== Style ==
Projector marked a noteworthy progression in the band's style, featuring piano and clean guitar work akin to that of gothic metal. Vocalist Mikael Stanne's prevalent use of clean vocals, featured sparsely on previous albums Skydancer and The Gallery, differentiated this release from their previous work. Because of its deviation from the band's previous efforts, Projector was met with a mixed reception by longtime fans, though it also attracted a fair number of new listeners.

== Track listing ==
All lyrics are written by Mikael Stanne.

No.	Title	Music	Length
1.	"FreeCard"	Henriksson, Sundin, Jivarp	4:31
2.	"ThereIn"	Henriksson, Sundin	5:55
3.	"UnDo Control"	Sundin, Jivarp, Henriksson	5:10
4.	"Auctioned"	Jivarp	6:06
5.	"To a Bitter Halt"	Henriksson, Johansson	4:48
6.	"The Sun Fired Blanks"	Henriksson, Sundin, Johansson	4:17
7.	"Nether Novas"	Jivarp, Sundin, Henriksson	6:14
8.	"Day to End"	Stanne	3:08
9.	"Dobermann"	Henriksson, Sundin	4:38
10.	"On Your Time"	Henriksson, Jivarp, Johansson	5:37
Total length:			50:29

Dope Music digipak Korean 2004 bonus track
No.	Title	Music	Additional Notes	Length
11.	"UnDo Control"	Sundin, Jivarp, Henriksson	Live at Krzemionki Studio TVP, Kraków, on 7 October 2002, from the Live Damage DVD	3:49

2009 reissue
No.	Title	Music	Additional notes	Length
11.	"Asleep in the Bandaged Light"	Jivarp	Instrumental orchestral track, some melody of "FreeCard", previously unreleased	3:20
12.	"No One"	Henriksson, Sundin	from Exposures – In Retrospect and Denial	4:41
13.	"Exposure"	Henriksson, Johansson, Sundin	from Exposures – In Retrospect and Denial	3:52
14.	"ThereIn"	Henriksson, Sundin	Live at the Rolling Stone, Milan, on 31 October 2008, from the Where Death Is Most Alive DVD, previously unreleased	6:11

== Release history ==
The limited edition digipak includes the bonus track "Exposure". However, there were problems with the pressings because not all the digipaks include "Exposure" and there are some traditional releases that include the track. The Japanese version of the album has different cover art and includes a booklet with more photos and biographical information. The 2009 reissue has digitally remastered audio.

Date	Note
10 August 1999	
25 November 1999	
25 May 2009	Reissue

== Credits ==
=== Dark Tranquillity ===
- Mikael Stanne − vocals; lyrics, image editing and layout
- Niklas Sundin − guitars; cover artwork and inlay
- Fredrik Johansson – guitars
- Martin Henriksson − bass; guitars (UnDo Control (Live) & ThereIn (Live))
- Anders Jivarp − drums

=== Production ===
- Johan Carlberg − photography
- Göran Finnberg – mastering (at The Mastering Room)
- Ulf Horbelt – remastering

==== On "ThereIn" (Live) ====
- Andrew Pardo – engineering
- Tue Madsen – mixing, mastering
- Alberto Rosetto – recording
- Mario Struglia – recording

=== Additional musicians ===
- Fredrik Nordström – keyboards, piano, arrangements (6), production
- Johanna Andersson – co-vocals (3)
- Michael Nicklasson − bass (UnDo Control (Live))
- Daniel Antonsson – bass (ThereIn (Live))
- Martin Brändström − keyboards and electronics (UnDo Control (Live) & ThereIn (Live))
