= Haven (Dark Tranquillity album) =

Studio album by Dark Tranquillity
- Released: July 17, 2000
- Recorded: March–April 2000 Studio Fredman
- Genre: Melodic death metal, gothic metal
- Length: 43:06
- Label: Century Media
- Producer: Dark Tranquillity & Fredrik Nordström

Dark Tranquillity chronology
Projector (1999)	Haven (2000)	Damage Done (2002)

Haven is the fifth studio album by Swedish melodic death metal band Dark Tranquillity, initially released on 17 July 2000 in Europe. This release is the first recorded as a six-piece, the first to feature Mikael Niklasson and Martin Brändström, and the first release with Martin Henriksson on guitar, switching from his previous position on bass.

== Style ==
Haven retains some of the death metal elements of past albums, adding more electronics and more polished production. Mikael Stanne mostly uses harsh vocals, but his clean vocals that were prominent on the previous album, Projector, are used on "Emptier Still" and bonus track "In Sight", the latter showing more of a cleanly-sung rock style.

== Track listing ==
All lyrics are written by Mikael Stanne.

No.	Title	Music	Length
1.	"The Wonders at Your Feet"	Brändström; Jivarp; Henriksson	3:00
2.	"Not Built to Last"	Jivarp; Henriksson; Brändström	3:38
3.	"Indifferent Suns"	Nicklasson; Henriksson	3:35
4.	"Feast of Burden"	Henriksson; Jivarp	3:25
5.	"Haven"	Jivarp; Henriksson	3:32
6.	"The Same"	Brändström; Jivarp; Henriksson	3:10
7.	"Fabric"	Brändström	3:56
8.	"Ego Drama"	Jivarp; Henriksson	4:34
9.	"Rundown"	Henriksson; Jivarp	3:53
10.	"Emptier Still"	Henriksson	3:39
11.	"At Loss for Words"	Jivarp; Henriksson	6:44
Total length:			43:06

Japan Reissue
No.	Title	Music	Length
12.	"Cornered"	Henriksson; Brändström	3:59

2009 Remastered Reissue
No.	Title	Music	Length
12.	"In Sight"	Stanne; Jivarp; Henriksson	4:12
13.	"Misery in Me"	Stanne; Jivarp; Sundin; Henriksson	4:39
14.	"Cornered"	Henriksson; Brändström	3:59
15.	"The Wonders at Your Feet" (live)	Brändström; Jivarp; Henriksson	3:45

Videos

- "Therein" (first digipak and Japan only)

== Reception ==
Like the previous album, Projector, critical reception was mixed. Guitarist Niklas Sundin has been quite critical of the album, stating that this is his least favourite Dark Tranquillity album, considering it "too safe in places" and stating that the album "could probably benefit from more variation". Despite the mixed feelings towards Haven, MetalGuru listed it #5 in its "Retro 2000 Top 5 Albums." AllMusic called it "inspired" and a "career milestone".

Professional ratings
Review scores
Source	Rating
AllMusic	4/5 stars

== Release history ==
Date	Note
7 July 2000	
5 May 2009	Reissue

== Credits ==
=== Dark Tranquillity ===
- Mikael Stanne − vocals
- Niklas Sundin − guitars
- Martin Henriksson − guitars
- Michael Nicklasson − bass
- Martin Brändström − electronics
- Anders Jivarp − drums

=== Other Personnel ===
- Christer Lundberg - creative assistance
- Anders Fridén - engineering
- Fredrik Nordström - engineering
- Kerstin Rössler - photography
- Lindor Tidang - photography
- Göran Finnberg - mastering
- Ulf Horbelt - remastering
- Niklas Sundin − artwork
