= Mikael Stanne =

Swedish metal vocalist

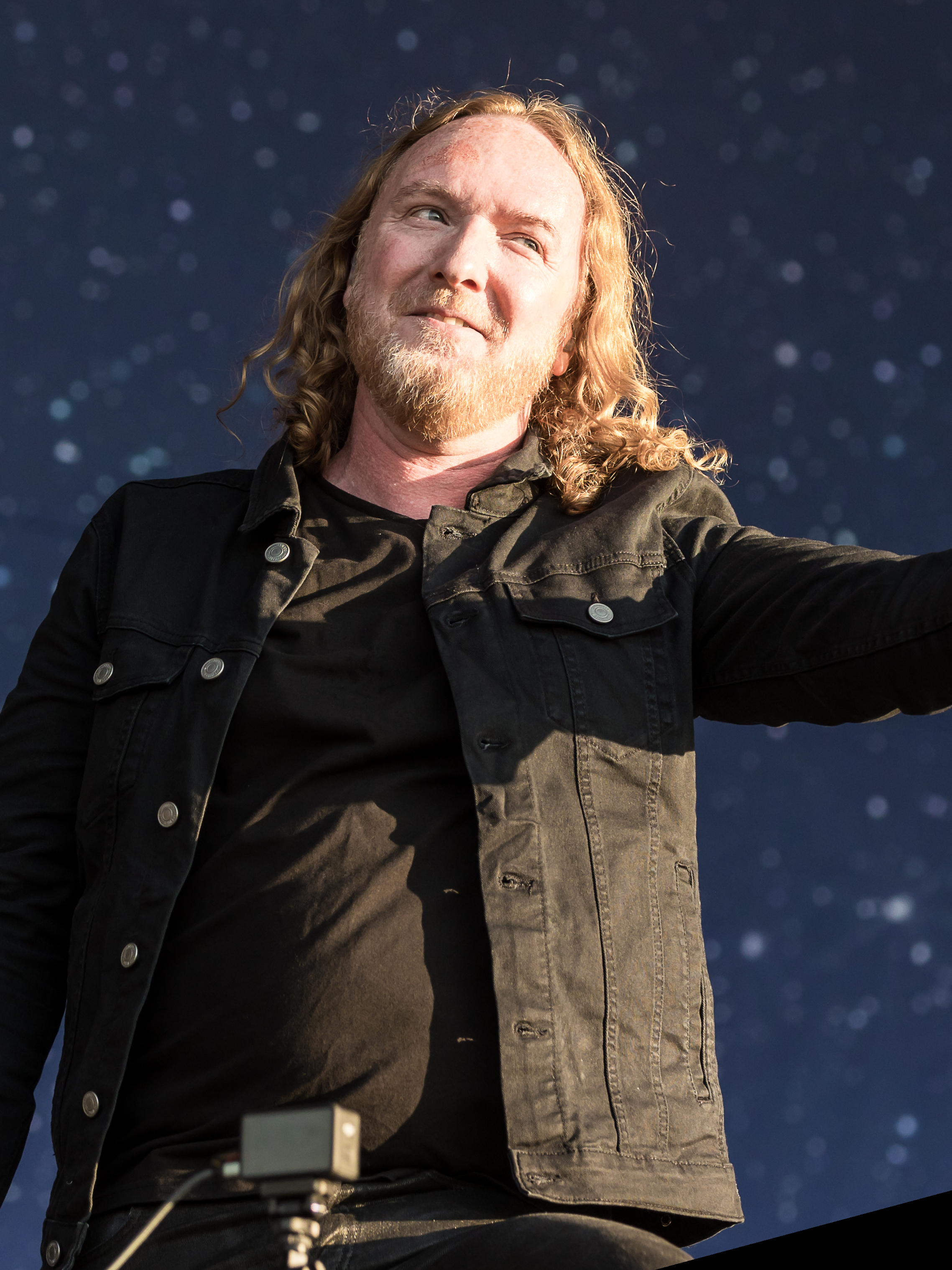
- Stanne in 2025

Background information
- Born: Bengt Mikael Stanne; 20 May 1974 (age 52); Gothenburg, Sweden
- Genre: Melodic death metal
- Occupations: Singer; songwriter
- Years active: 1989–present
- Member of: Dark Tranquillity; The Halo Effect; Grand Cadaver; Cemetery Skyline
- Formerly of: In Flames; HammerFall

Bengt Mikael Stanne (born 20 May 1974) is a Swedish musician, best known as the vocalist, primary lyricist and a former guitarist for the melodic death metal band Dark Tranquillity. Since the departure of original drummer Anders Jivarp in 2021, Stanne is the only remaining original member of the band. Stanne is also the vocalist for bands Grand Cadaver, the Halo Effect and Cemetery Skyline, which formed in 2020, 2021 and 2023, respectively. He was also an ex-vocalist for HammerFall and In Flames.

== Early life ==
Stanne spoke of his early musical influences, "I first got into extreme metal through trading tapes and reading fanzines. When I was fourteen, I went with one of my neighbours, Shamaatae, to sit in on a rehearsal with his new band. That band was Grotesque and seeing them rehearse was incredibly cool. The intensity and speed of the music being played at maximum volume impressed me like very little had up until that point. My favourite song quickly became 'Blood Runs From The Altar', from their second demo The Black Gate Is Closed. I was already a huge J.R.R. Tolkien fan, so this was just perfection to me."

== Career ==
=== Dark Tranquillity ===
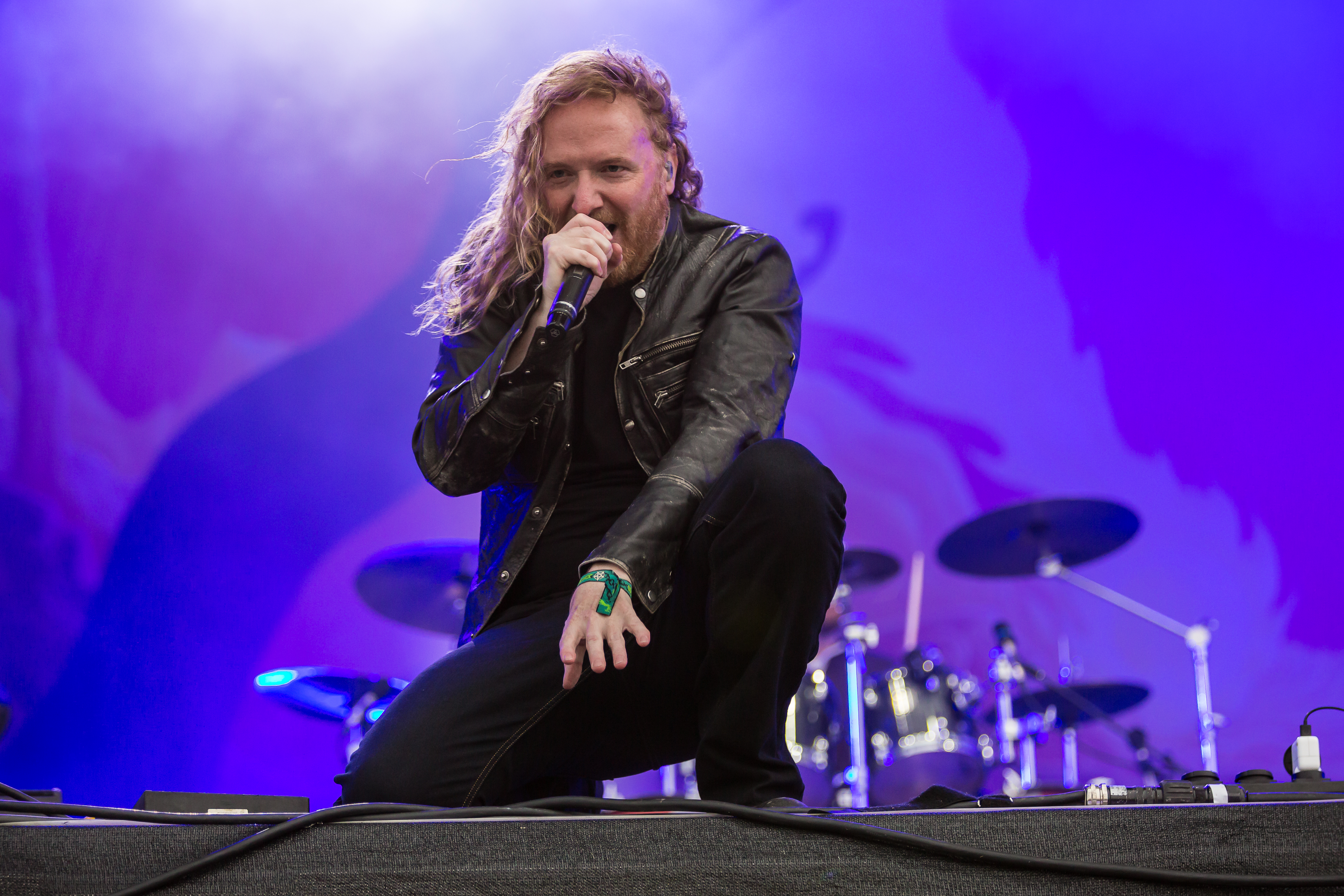
Stanne with Dark Tranquillity at Rockharz Open Air 2022 in Germany

Stanne, along with Niklas Sundin, formed Dark Tranquillity because they were bored, along with interest in metal from their influences. He played guitar and performed clean backing vocals on Dark Tranquillity's first album, Skydancer, as well as on their early demos, including Enfeebled Earth released under the name Septic Broiler. In 1994, Anders Fridén, Dark Tranquillity's original vocalist, left the band to join In Flames. Stanne then became the new vocalist and discontinued playing guitar.

In addition to his usual growling vocals, Dark Tranquillity's 1999 album, Projector, showcased his operatic "clean" singing abilities. After Haven, however, the clean style was mostly abandoned until the release of Fiction in 2007.

=== Other projects ===
Stanne is the vocalist for the death metal band Grand Cadaver, formed in 2020, and for the gothic metal band Cemetery Skyline, formed in 2024. He has also contributed vocals to the collective Novarupta, performing on the track "Mare Tranquillitatis" from the album Disillusion Fire.

Stanne was the original vocalist for HammerFall from 1993 until 1996, after which he was replaced because of his commitment to Dark Tranquillity.

== Influences ==
Stanne was influenced by Florida death metal bands, such as Atheist, and Swedish death metal bands such as Grotesque.

== Personal life ==
Stanne has been married to Pipsa Piipari since 1999. The couple have one daughter.

== Discography ==
With Dark Tranquillity

- Skydancer (1993)
- The Gallery (1995)
- The Mind's I (1997)
- Projector (1999)
- Haven (2000)
- Damage Done (2002)
- Character (2005)
- Fiction (2007)
- We Are the Void (2010)
- Construct (2013)
- Atoma (2016)
- Moment (2020)
- Endtime Signals (2024)

With Grand Cadaver

- Madness Comes (2021)
- Into the Maw of Death (2021)
- Deities of Deathlike Sleep (2023)
- The Rot Beneath (2025)

With the Halo Effect

- Days of the Lost (2022)
- March of The Unheard (2025)

With In Flames

- Demo ‘93 (1993)
- Lunar Strain (1994)

With Cemetery Skyline

- Nordic Gothic (2024)

== Guest appearances ==
- He recorded guest vocals on Ceremonial Oath’s 1993 album The Book of Truth and designed the bands’s logo.
- In 2005, Stanne provided a clean vocal passage on the Nightrage song "Frozen", alongside At the Gates vocalist Tomas Lindberg, on their album Descent into Chaos.
- In 2008, Stanne performed guest vocals in the band Scar of the Sun, for a track named “Ode to a Failure”.
- In 2010 Stanne guested on Solution .45's debut album by contributing the lyrics for most of the tracks and providing vocals on the tracks "Bladed Vaults" and "On Embered Fields Adust".
- In 2010, Stanne provided vocals in the song “Weather the Storm” by Insomnium.
- In 2010, Nightrage released the song “Gallant Deeds”, an unreleased track recorded by Stanne from the Descent into Chaos sessions. It is now available on the Nightrage re-issue Vengeance Descending.
- In 2011, Stanne appeared on the track “Wastelands Within” by Mourning Caress, for their album Deep Wounds, Bright Scars.
- In 2012, Stanne appeared on the track “Skin Changer” by Helcaraxë for their album Red Dragon.
- In 2015, Stanne appeared on several tracks in the album The Great Lie by Melted Space.
- In 2018, Stanne provided vocals for the album Darkening Light by Melted Space.
- In 2020, Stanne appeared on the track "Whispers from the Wicked" by Carthagods, on their album The Monster in Me.
- In 2020, Stanne provided additional vocals on the track "A Meditation Upon Death" by Nonexist, from their album Like the Fearless Hunter.
- In 2022, Stanne acted as a guest vocalist for six tracks for the video game Metal: Hellsinger.
- In 2023, Stanne provided vocals for the tracks "PEREGRINATION" and "BEINGS OF LIGHT" in the album STARS & EMBERS by ISON.
- In 2025, Stanne appeared as a guest vocalist on the track "The Following Silence" by Time and the Hunter, included on their debut album Weapon pt.I.
