= Melodic death metal =

Subgenre of heavy metal music

- Other names: Melodeath
- Stylistic origins: Death metal; heavy metal
- Cultural origins: Early–mid 1990s, Sweden and England

Fusion genres
- Melodic metalcore; melodic black-death

Regional scenes
- Gothenburg, Sweden

Other topics
- New Wave of British Heavy Metal; Swedish death metal

Melodic death metal (also referred to as melodeath) is a subgenre of death metal that employs highly melodic guitar riffs and solos, often borrowing from traditional heavy metal, combined with low-pitched growls or aggressive screams and the heavily distorted guitars of traditional death metal.

Pioneered by the English band Carcass with their 1993 album Heartwork, melodic death metal was developed further by Swedish bands like At the Gates, Dark Tranquillity, and In Flames in the mid-1990s. The Swedish death metal scene did much to popularise the style, soon centering in the "Gothenburg metal" scene. At the Gates' Slaughter of the Soul, Dark Tranquillity's The Gallery, and In Flames' The Jester Race, all released in the mid-1990s, were highly influential albums in melodic death metal, with At the Gates and In Flames being the two most common influences on North American 2000s heavy metal bands. Many American heavy metal bands emulated At the Gates' sound, resulting in the usage of the phrase "At the Gates worship".

In the late 1990s and early 2000s, many melodic death metal bands emerged, including Children of Bodom, Arch Enemy, Amon Amarth, The Black Dahlia Murder, Insomnium, and Soilwork. In the 2000s decade, melodic death metal achieved popularity among heavy metal fans, starting with the release of In Flames' 2002 album Reroute to Remain, which showed a change to a more eclectic sound while retaining the band's melodic death metal sound. Many other melodic death metal bands quickly had chart success.

In the mid-2000s, melodic metalcore, a subgenre of metalcore that combines the genre with melodic death metal, achieved popularity with the chart success and sales success of bands like Killswitch Engage, All That Remains, and As I Lay Dying. Deathcore bands during this time period like Bring Me the Horizon and Through the Eyes of the Dead also were influenced by melodic death metal and achieved popularity.

== Characteristics ==
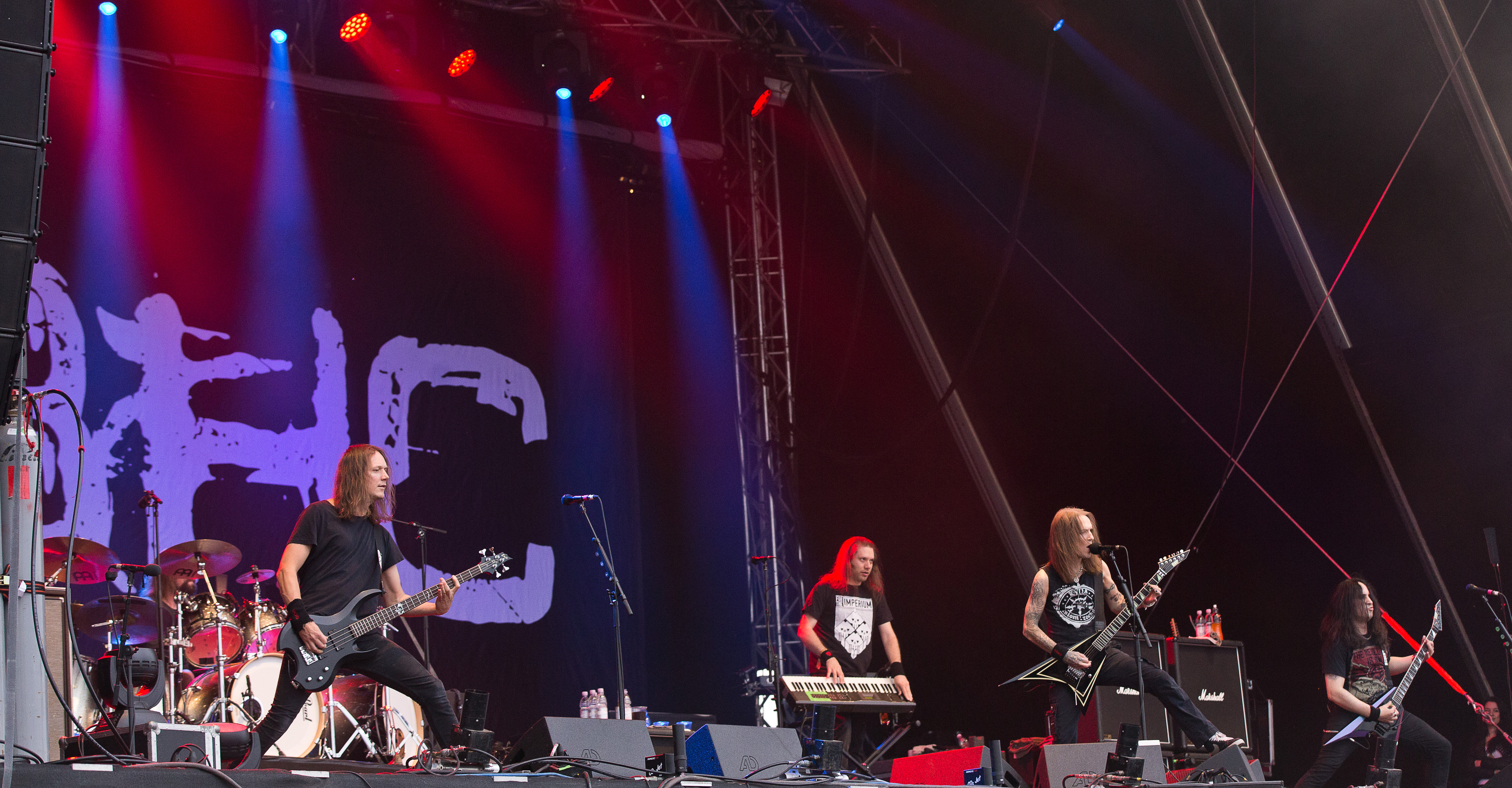
Children of Bodom combined melodic death metal with power metal influences.

Melodic death metal combines death metal with elements of traditional heavy metal ranging as far as the New Wave of British Heavy Metal, especially melodic or harmonized guitar riffs, with the heavily distorted guitars, fast double-bass drum patterns and occasional blast beats of death metal. Alternative Press Magazine describes the style as "incorporat[ing] stylistically 'pretty' and epic sounds" into the death metal formula, augmented by "blazing" guitar solos and "buzz-saw"-like guitar tones. The vocal style typically features harsh screams or low-pitched growling (similar to traditional death metal) but often features clean sung vocals as well. Melodic death metal is more prone to using conventional verse-chorus song structures, in contrast to traditional death metal’s use of unorthodox song structures and drastic tempo shifts.

Melodic death metal is said to be more musically diverse than traditional death metal. According to Vlad Nichols of Ultimate Guitar, the boundaries of melodic death metal "[grant] much more artistic freedom" to artists as opposed to traditional death metal, and enables enjoyment of death metal sounds by a wider audience. He assessed, "the heaviness was still there, but it was now made all the more enjoyable by the diversity of musical and thematic expression it provided." Some melodic death metal bands fuse the style with other styles of heavy metal and extreme metal. For example, Finnish band Children of Bodom is known for incorporating strong elements of power metal into their style.

== History ==
=== Origins (early–mid 1990s) ===
The mid-'90s were a strange time for death metal. [...] After nearly fifteen years, the lack of innovation made the genre grow stale, and it appeared that there was no place for newcomers as everything death metal offered had already been done. However, things changed towards the end of 1995, [when Gothenburg bands] eschewed the traditional trappings of death metal, and began experimenting with leading melody, more conventional riffing and lyrics exploring topics not only related to gruesome violence. [...] This new approach, aptly titled melodic death metal, granted much more artistic freedom and opened the genre up for a much wider audience – the heaviness was still there, but it was now made all the more enjoyable by the diversity of musical and thematic expression it provided.

— Vlad Nichols of Ultimate Guitar (June 21, 2020)

Much of the origin and popularity of melodic death metal can be attributed to the bands At the Gates, In Flames, and Dark Tranquillity, whose mid 1990s music releases (namely Slaughter of the Soul, The Jester Race, and The Gallery, respectively) are widely considered to have defined the genre and laid the foundation for the Gothenburg metal scene. Many of the band members from these acts shared a public transportation route through the city. Dark Tranquillity vocalist Mikael Stanne recalled the scene's origins: "The part of Gothenburg we’re all from is really tiny. There is basically one bus route that leads into the city. [...] I was at the first stop on the route, and that was where Tomas Lindberg from At The Gates lived as well. Then it would be [Dark Tranquillity guitarist] Niklas Sundin and Anders Fridén from In Flames. Then we’d meet up with the Björler twins and Anders and Peter Iwers – all on the same bus into the city. Then we’d sit in the park with a tape recorder and tons of beer, and that was it! The community and the friendships started there."

According to Vlad Nichols of Ultimate Guitar, "At the Gates, Dark Tranquility, and In Flames eschewed the traditional trappings of death metal, and began experimenting with leading melody, more conventional riffing and lyrics exploring topics not only related to gruesome violence - and everybody loved it. Following their initial success, Gothenburg became the Mecca of this new direction in death metal, and many more bands joined the fray." Writer Gary Sharpe-Young considered the Gothenburg scene the commercial salvation of death metal: "Gothenburg became the new Tampa and the genre received a new lease on life."

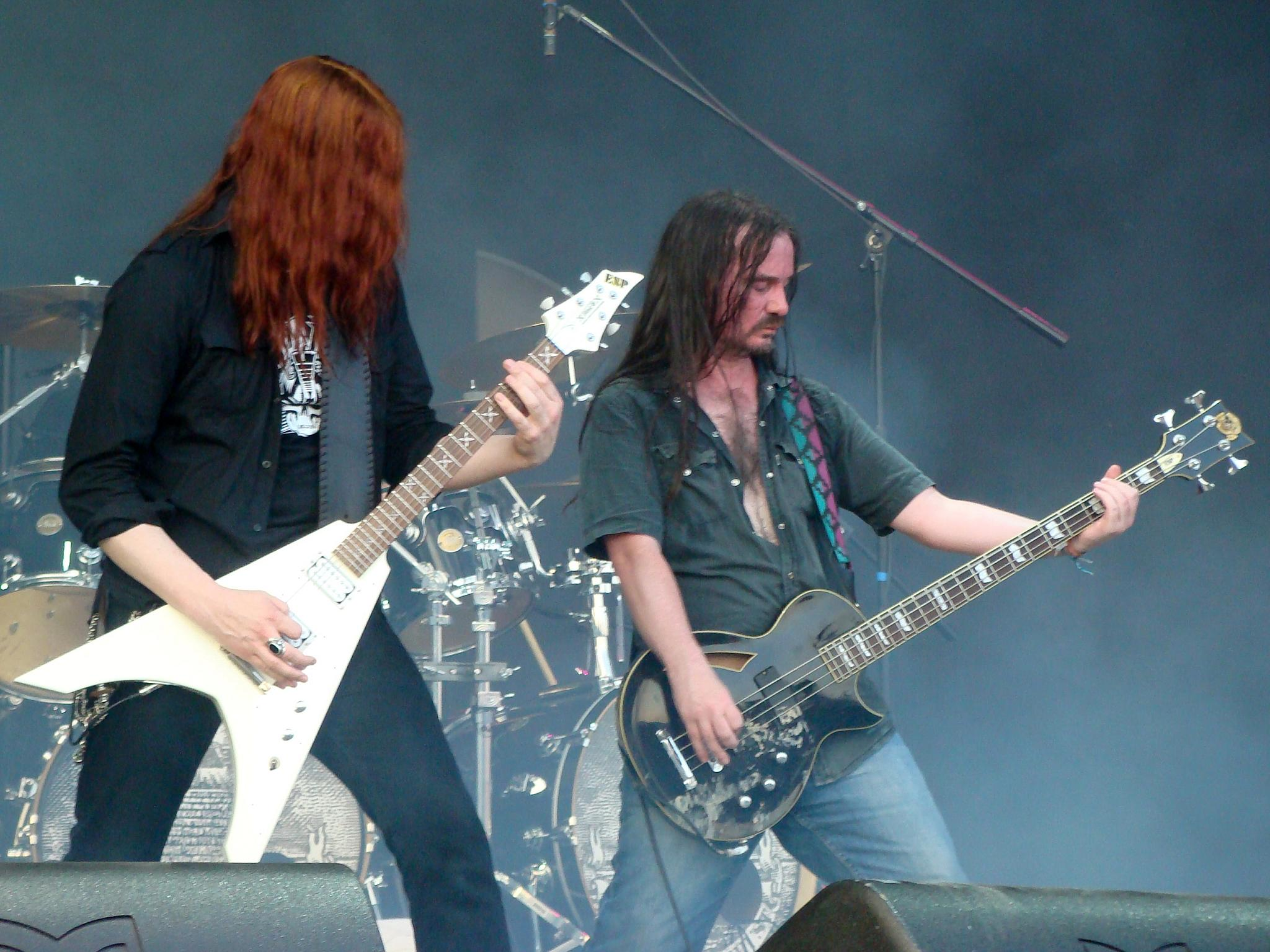
Carcass helped develop the melodic death metal genre with their 1993 album Heartwork.

The titular melodic elements can be traced to traditional Scandinavian musical motifs. Another pioneer was the English band Carcass, which performed grindcore on its first two releases but morphed into death metal and an increasingly melodic style on the Necroticism – Descanting the Insalubrious (1991) and Heartwork (1993). Death's 1995 album Symbolic is also considered to be influential in the development of the genre. Ceremonial Oath and Eucharist also are early melodic death metal bands; however, they never gained much attention outside of their own scene.

In Flames' The Jester Race combined death metal with guitar riffs heavily influenced by bands like Iron Maiden and Judas Priest. The album's sound heavily contrasted with traditional death metal, and made Swedish death metal more accessible to more people compared to other Swedish death metal albums that pioneered a new sound, including the death 'n' roll of Entombed's Wolverine Blues. At the Gates' Slaughter of the Soul influenced many American metal bands, especially metalcore bands who used guitar riffs and vocals emulating At the Gates' music. The vocals also were noted by AllMusic for being more decipherable than other death metal vocals, resembling high-pitched shrieks that foreshadowed 2000s American screamo bands. The album brought At the Gates underground popularity, including rotation on MTV's Headbanger's Ball, a nomination at the Swedish Grammys, and American tours with Morbid Angel and Napalm Death.

=== Expansion (Late 1990s and early 2000s) ===
In the late 1990s and early 2000s, melodic death metal quickly expanded with many bands emerging, including Amon Amarth, The Black Dahlia Murder, Arch Enemy, Soilwork, Insomnium, and Children of Bodom. Additionally, other genres would begin using melodic death metal as an influence, including melodic metalcore and melodic black/death. Stewart Mason claims that melodic metalcore has become very popular in the United States, using the term "Swedecore" to describe Scandinavian-style metal as played by non-Nordic bands. Many melodic death metal and metalcore bands (especially after melodic metalcore band Killswitch Engage rose in popularity) were heavily influenced by Slaughter of the Soul by At the Gates and had an influence of them in their music. Many heavy metal bands in the mid-2000s, in turn, were labeled "At the Gates worship".

=== Popularity and emergence of melodic metalcore (2000s) ===
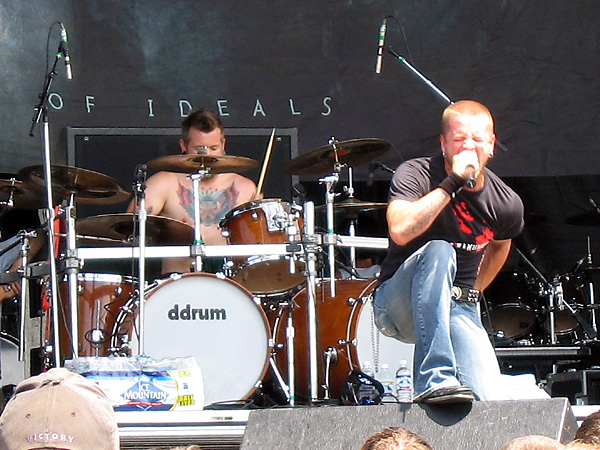
Melodic metalcore band All That Remains performing at Ozzfest 2006

In the 2000s, melodic death metal became popular among heavy metal fans. In 2002, In Flames' album Reroute to Remain peaked at number 10 on the Top Heatseekers chart. The album, retaining the band's melodic death metal sound, showed a diverse mix of different musical genres, including occasional electronica and hip-hop synthesizers and occasional clean singing. This helped gain the band a new amount of fans while alienating fans of In Flames' early work. In Flames' next two albums, Soundtrack to Your Escape (2004) and Come Clarity (2006), peaked at numbers 145 and 58 on the Billboard 200, respectively, with the latter album giving In Flames a Swedish Grammy Award. The Black Dahlia Murder, Arch Enemy, Children of Bodom, and Amon Amarth also enter the Billboard 200 during the 2000s decade. In the mid–late 2000s, melodic metalcore became one of the most popular heavy metal genres, with bands like Killswitch Engage, Unearth, Bullet for My Valentine, All That Remains, Shadows Fall and Atreyu achieving success, headlining major festivals and selling a lot of records. Melodic metalcore combined melodic death metal elements like melodic guitar riffs and screaming with elements of the original style of metalcore like breakdowns. At the Gates and In Flames were major influences on these bands. Killswitch Engage are often credited as the band that brought melodic metalcore into the mainstream among heavy metal fans. Some deathcore bands during this time, such as Through the Eyes of the Dead and Bring Me the Horizon, combined deathcore with melodic death metal.

== Subgenres ==
Many melodic death metal bands began being inspired by black metal and European romanticism. This style has been referred to as blackened melodic death metal, melodic blackened death metal and melodic black-death. However, unlike most other black metal, this take on the genre would incorporate an increased sense of melody and narrative.

Melodic metalcore is a fusion genre, incorporating elements of metalcore and melodic death metal, with a heavy emphasis on melodic instrumentation, blast beats, metalcore-stylized breakdowns and clean singing. These bands often take influence from the guitar riffs and writing styles of Swedish melodic death metal bands, especially At the Gates, In Flames, Arch Enemy and Soilwork.

== See also ==
- List of melodic death metal bands
- New Wave of British Heavy Metal
- Swedish death metal
