= Muhammad Ali (disambiguation) =

Muhammad Ali (1942–2016) was an American boxer and activist.

Muhammad Ali, Mohammad Ali, Mohamed Ali, or Mohammed Ali may also refer to:

== People ==
=== Literature ===
- Muhammad Ali Siddiqui (1938–2013), Pakistani literary critic
- Mohammed Naseehu Ali (born 1971), Ghanaian-born author
- Taha Muhammad Ali (1931–2011), Palestinian poet
- Muhammad Ali (writer) (1874–1951), also known as Maulana Muhammad Ali, religious scholar and leading figure of Ahmadiyya Islamic movement
- Mohamed Abdulkarim Ali (b. 1985), Somali-Canadian writer

=== Music ===
- Muhammad Ali (drummer) (born 1936), American free jazz drummer (born as Raymond Patterson)
- Mohammed Ali (duo), a Swedish rap duo made of Moms and Alias Ruggig (also part of Swedish hip hop collective Ayla)
- Mohammad Ali Siddiqui (1944–2014), Bangladeshi playback singer
- Mohamed Ali (singer) (born 1993), Danish singer of Egyptian and Iraqi origin

=== Politics ===
- Muhammad Ali of Egypt (1769–1849), Egyptian monarch
- Muhammad Ali (born 1979), Prince of the Sa'id
- Mohammed Ali Khan Walajah (1717–1795), Nawab of Arcot in India
- Muhammad ibn Ali as-Senussi (1787–1859), founder of the Senussi order
- Mohammad Ali Shah Qajar (1872–1925), Shah of Iran
- Mohammad Ali Jauhar (1878–1931), Muslim Indian political leader, journalist, and poet
- Muhammad Ali Bogra (1909–1963), Prime Minister of Pakistan
- Mohammad Ali (Cox's Bazar politician) (c. 1944–2020), Bangladeshi politician
- Muhammad Ali (Brunei) (died 1661), thirteenth sultan of Brunei in 1660, murdered
- Mohammad Ali (Kenyan politician) (born 1974), Kenyan politician also known as Moha Jicho Pevu
- Mohammad Ali (Khyber Pakhtunkhwa politician), Pakistani politician from Upper Dir District
- Mohamed Ali (politician, born 1996), Swedish politician
- Mohammad Ali (Telangana) (born 1952), Deputy Chief Minister of Telangana, India since 2014
- Mohammed Ali Tewfik (1875–1955), Regent of Egypt during the minority of Farouk of Egypt
- Muhammad Ali Wazir, Pakistani politician and leader of the Pashtun Tahafuz Movement
- Mohammad Ali (aka Muawiyah), key leader of Jemaah Islamiyah, killed in January 2012
- Mohamed Ali Houmed (born 1973), Djibouti politician
- Mohamed Ali Nafti (born 1959), Tunisian diplomat and politician
- Muhammad Ali Jinnah (1876–1948), founder of Pakistan
- Mohamed Ali (Egyptian contractor) (born 1974), famous for his September 2019 videos provoking mass street protests in Egypt
- Mohammad Ali Ramazani Dastak (1963–2020), Iranian politician
- Mohammad-Ali Ramin (born 1954), Iranian politician
- Mohammad Mosaddak Ali (born 1960), Bangladeshi entrepreneur and politician
- Chaudhry Muhammad Ali (1905–1980), Prime Minister of Pakistan
- Dusé Mohamed Ali (1866–1945), African nationalist
- Muhammad Rapsel Ali (1971–2023), Indonesian politician
- Mohammad Ali (born Lie Kiat Teng, 1912–1983), Indonesian Minister of Health
- Safaa Mohammed Ali (1982–2005), Iraqi militant and Al-Qaeda member
- Pengiran Mohamed Ali (1916–2005), Bruneian politician
- Mohammad Ali Mohammad Daud (1936–2018), Bruneian politician and diplomat
- Mohammad Ali (Netrokona politician), Bengladeshi politician
- Mikael of Wollo (1850–1918), Ethiopian lord named Mohammed Ali before conversion.

=== Sports ===
- Mohammad Ali (cricketer, born 1973), Pakistani cricketer
- Mohammad Ali (cricketer, born 1982), Pakistani cricketer
- Mohammad Ali (cricketer, born 1989), Pakistani cricketer
- Mohammad Ali (cricketer, born 1992), Pakistani cricketer
- Mohamed Ali (footballer) (active from 2015), Indian footballer
- Mohamed Ali Camara (born 1997), Guinean footballer
- Mohamed Ali Diallo (born 1978), Burkinan soccer player
- Muhammad Ali (Pakistani boxer) (born 1933), Pakistani boxer
- Muhammad Ali (footballer, born 1985), Indonesian former footballer
- Muhammad Ali (footballer, born 1989), Pakistani international footballer
- Muhammad Ali (British boxer) (born 1996), British boxer
- Mohamed Ali Messaoud (born 1953), Algerian former footballer
- Mohamed Aly (boxer) (born 1975), Egyptian boxer

=== Other people ===
- Mohammad Ali (actor) (1931–2006), Pakistani actor
- Mohammad Sadat Ali (1942–1971), Bengali academic killed by the Pakistan army during the Bangladesh Liberation war
- Mohammad Shamshad Ali (1934–1971), Bangladeshi physician killed in the Bangladesh Liberation war
- Mohammed Ali bin Johari (1976–2008), a notorious convicted killer from Singapore
- Usman bin Haji Muhammad Ali (1943–1968), alias Janatin, an Indonesian soldier and terrorist
- Muhammad Ali Mungeri (1846–1927), Indian Muslim scholar who was the founder and first rector of Nadwatul Ulama
- Norishyam Mohamed Ali (1972–1999), Singaporean convicted murderer executed for a Bulgarian student's murder
- Muhammad Ali (admiral) (born 1967), Indonesian Navy admiral
- Muhammad Ali (academic), Pakistani academic and biologist

== Places ==
- Mohammad Ali, Behbahan, a village in Iran
- Mohammad Ali, Lali, a village in Iran

== Other uses ==
- "Muhammad Ali" (song), a 2001 single by the British dance band Faithless
- "Black Superman (Muhammad Ali)", a 1975 Johnny Wakelin song
- Louisville International Airport, officially known as Louisville Muhammad Ali International Airport since 2019
- Muhammad Ali (miniseries), a 2021 documentary series directed by Ken Burns
- Muhammad Ali dynasty, was the ruling dynasty of Egypt and Sudan during parts of the 19th and 20th century

== See also ==
- Mehmet Ali (disambiguation)
- Mohammed Ali Shah (disambiguation)
- Mahmud Ali (disambiguation)
- Ali Muhammad (disambiguation)
- Muhammad (disambiguation)
- Ali (disambiguation)
