= Siesta! =

Music festival in Sweden

SiESTA!
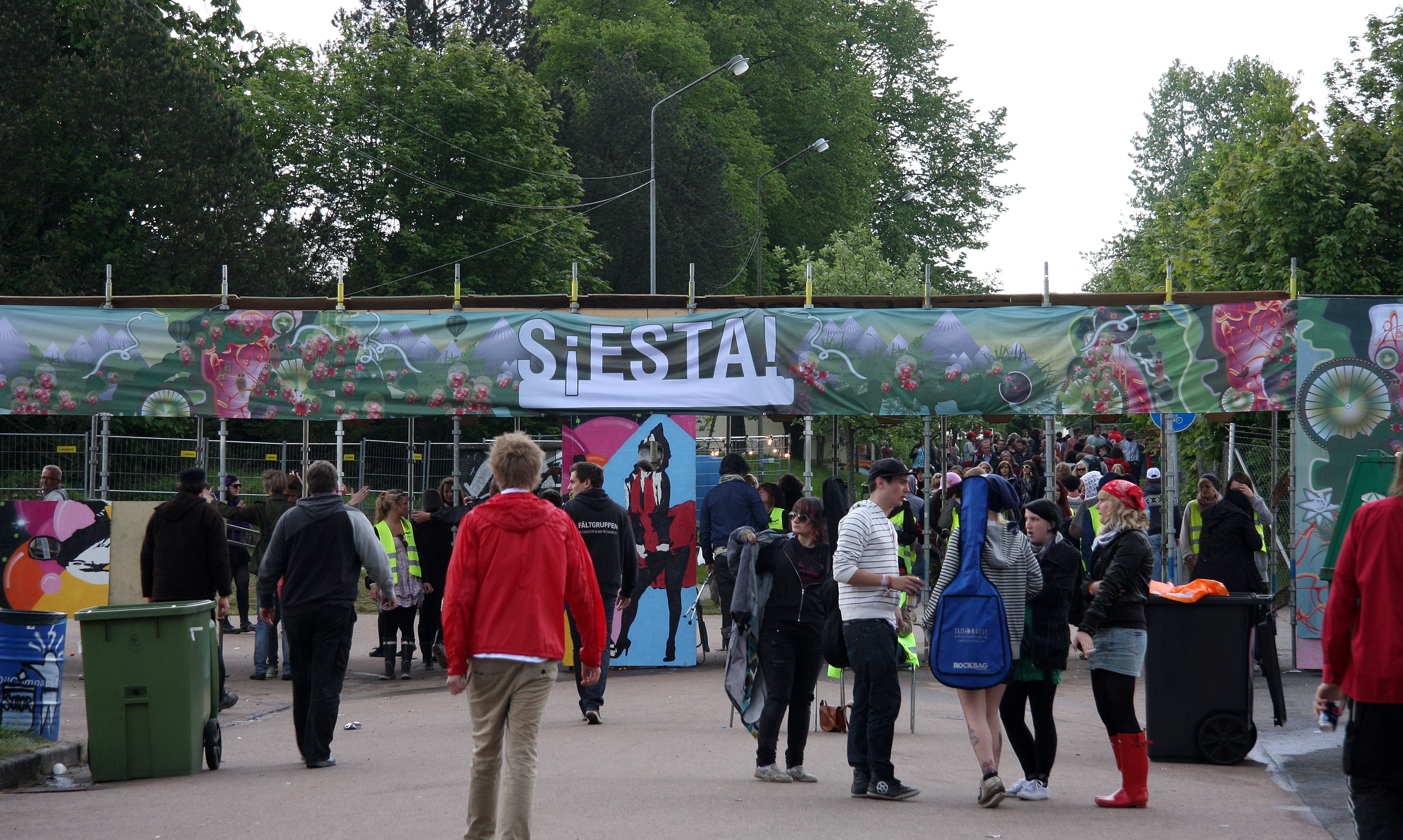
- Entrance to the Siesta! music festival in Hässleholm, Sweden, 2010.
- Genre: Pop, Alternative music, Hip Hop, Metal, Rock, World music, Electronic music, Indie music
- Dates: First weekend of June
- Locations: Hässleholm, Sweden
- Years active: 2003 - 2012 & 2014
- Founders: KF Markan
- Website: www.siestafestivalen.se

SiESTA! was an annual music festival that took place in Hässleholm, Sweden, between 2003 and 2014. It was arranged for the first time in 2003 by the non-profit organization KF Markan.

== History ==
KF Markan was founded in March 1989. Before the first Siesta! in 2003 the organization arranged another festival called Festival Blå until 2001 when the board decided to change the direction of the festival. 2002 was a gap year where KF Markan made up the plans for Siesta!

The festival took place in the outskirts of Hässleholm during three days in the first weekend of June between Thursday and Saturday. The number of people attending the festival grew from 1,000 to ten times that number in four years. The audience was mainly from Sweden, Norway and Denmark. The cornerstones of the festival was faith, hope and love.

In 2013, the festival was cancelled at short notice due to poor ticket sales; only 2,400 tickets had been sold and a loss of 4 to 5 million kroner was anticipated. The festival returned in 2014 on a smaller scale, but was cancelled in 2015 after the organisers, Kulturföreningen Markan, applied for bankruptcy.

== Stages ==
Name	Capacity	Active	Notable bands
Fiesta!	14,000	2003 -	Placebo, Phoenix, Wolfmother, Röyksopp, Håkan Hellström, The Sounds, The Kooks,
Chili!	7,000	2003 -	Sonic Youth, August Burns Red, Hercules and Love Affair, Rebecca & Fiona, Danko Jones,
Playa!	3,000	2008 -	Alesana, Fibes, oh fibes!, First Aid Kit
Casa!	1,000	2003 -	Future Idiots, Pretty Whores of Manhattan, Radio Luxemburg,

== Lineups ==
2003
The Ark, Joddla Med Siv, Loserville, Christian Kjellvander, David and The Citizens, Her Majesty, Marit Bergman, Lotta Wenglén Band, Pete Thompson, Thousand Dollar Playboys, Whyte Seeds, Dynamo Chappel, Last Days of April

2004
Weeping Willows, Bergman Rock, Eskobar, Latin kings, Timbuktu + Damn, José Gonzales, Last Days of April, Mattias Hellberg, Shout out louds, Alice in videoland, Niccokick, Sugarplum fairys, Jens Lekman, Pete Thompson, My sweet medicine, Wet, The Unisex, The Bukks, Idiot Savants

2005
Bergman Rock, The Ark, Moneybrother, Silverbullit, Svenska Akademien, Nina Rochelle, Ison & Fille, Kristofer Åström & The Hidden Truck, Suburban Kids with Biblical Names, Johnossi, Logh, Strip Music, [ingenting], The Spitts, Fatboy, Seven feet four, Scraps of Tape, Artmade, Double 0, Todd Smith, The great Decay, Oscar & The Firemasters of Sweden, Bye bye beauties, Babylonians, Andreas Tilliander, Son Kite, Sophie Rimheden, Slagsmålsklubben, Hans Appelqvist, Sapporo 72, Peter Ripa, Libra, mRq5, Tsukimono

2006
Advance Patrol, Audrey Blood Music, Body Core, Burst, CuteTarmac, David & the Citizens, Dia Psalma, DJ Fransjäger, Familjen, Hello Saferide, Henrik Berggren, Hets, Intohimo, Jenny Wilson, Kristian Anttila, Maeds Dominos, Mew, Montt Mardié, Morpheena, Pascal, Peps Persson & Blodsbandet, Sci-Fi Skane, Sleazy Joe, Soak the Sin, Spånka, Talkin to teapots, The Great Decay, The Radio Dept., The Slaves, The Sounds, The Tiny, Timo Räisänen, U.W.O, Velouria, Whyte Seeds

2007
The Animal Five, Asha Ali, Black Belt, The Concretes, The Consequences, Detektivbyrån, Ed Harcourt [UK], Familjen, Fibes, Oh Fibes!, Jesse Malin [US], Juvelen, Kristofer Åström & Rainaways, Laakso, Lamont, Maeds Dominos, Melody Club, Miss Li, Molotov Jive, Moonbabies, Mustasch, Navid Modiri & Gudarna, Neverstore, Nikola Sarcevic, The Paper Faces, The Pen Expers, Peps Blodsband, Per Arnez, Porn och Grafik, The Plan, Promoe, Radical Cheerleaders, The Rockets, Sahara Hotnights, Salem al Fakir, Shout Out Louds, Slagsmålsklubben, Svenska Akademien, Thunder Express, Teddybears STHLM, Tingsek

2008
Alf, Adam Tensta, Alter Me [GRL], All-time low [US], Andi Almqvist, Anna Järvinen, Babian, Bahnhof [DK], Billie the vision & The Dancers, Britta Persson, Caesars, Christian Kjellvander, Disfear, Doktor Kosmos, Eagles of Death Metal [US], El Perro Del Mar, Enter Shikari [UK], Familjen, Firefox AK, First Floor Power, Florence Valentin, Håkan Hellström, Hästpojken, Jazz Attacks, Jive! (inställt), Johnossi, Jonas Game, José Gonzalez, Jucifer [US], Kristian Antilla, Kultiration, La Puma, Loop Troop Rockers, Lukestar [NO], Lykke Li (inställt), Masshysteri, Millencolin, Moneybrother, Moto Boy, Nephew [DK], Niccokick, Pascal, Path of No Return, Rubies [US], Scraps of Tape, Sunset Rubdown [CAN], The Deer Tracks, The Ettes [US], The Radio Dept., The Sunshine, Those Dancing Days, Today is the day [US], Truckfighters, Under Byen [DK], Vapnet, Zeigeist

2009
Abramis Brama, Adept, Adiam Dymott, Alesana [US], Anna Maria Espinosa, Anna Ternheim, Anti-Flag [US], As In RebekkaMaria [DK], Casiokids [NO], Cult Of Luna, Dag För Dag, David Sandström, Overdrive, Dead By April, Division of Laura Lee, Dundertåget, Dúné [DK], Eldkvarn, Expatriate [AU], Fatboy, Frida Hyvönen, Handen på hjärtat: (Deportees, Franke, Gustaf Spetz, Jonathan Johansson, The (International) Noise Conspiracy), herbrightskies, Hoffmaestro & Chraa, I are droid, Jenny Wilson, Joel Alme, John ME (inställt), Junior Boys [CA], Kleerup, Lazee, Mando Diao, Marissa Nadler [US], Markus Krunegård, Molotov Jive, Navid Modiri & Gudarna, Nordpolen, Parken, Parker Lewis, Phoenix [FR], Placebo [UK], Promoe & Spiderdogs, Rumble In Rhodos [NO], Sonic Youth [US], The Blackout [UK], The Horrors [UK], The High Fives, The Spitts, Tiger Lou, Tysta Mari, Timbuktu & Damn, Wildbirds & Peacedrums Artister - Casa!

2010
Amanda Jenssen, Andreas Söderlund, Andreas Tilliander, Anna von Hausswolff, Babian, Babylove & The Van Dangos [DK], Bad Hands, Bahnhof [DK], bob hund, Bruket, Built to Spill [US], Danko Jones [US], Dead Prez [US], Dinosaur Jr. [US], Familjen, Fibes! Oh Fibes!, First Aid Kit, Gaby and the Guns, Cristian Dinamarca, Elias and the Wizzkids, Hästpojken, Invasionen, Kristian Anttila, Mattias Alkberg + Nerverna, Monty, Name The Pet, (ingenting), Intohimo, Jesaiah, Johnossi, Kapten Röd, Khoma, Maskinen, Mew [DK], Mofeta & Jerre, Mustasch, Näääk, Ossler, Pascal, Per Egland, Röyksopp [NO], Satan Takes A Holiday, Sophie Rimheden, Stefan Sundström, Teddybears, The Bear Quartet, The Hives, The Radio Dept. Thåström, Timo Räisänen

2011
...And You Will Know Us By The Trail Of Dead, Adam Tensta, Adept, Adrian Lux, Alcoholic Faith Mission, Ane Brun, Asking Alexandria, August Burns Red, Billie the Vision and the Dancers, bob hund, Bombus, Britta Persson, Bullet, Crookers, Dada Life, Daniel Adams-Ray, Den Svenska Björnstammen, Dundertåget, Graveyard, Håkan Hellström, Hanna Turi, Hårda Tider, Henrik Berggren, Her Bright Skies, Hercules and Love Affair, Imperial State Electric, Kadawatha, Ladytron [UK], Last Days Of April, Looptroop Rockers, Marcus Price & Carli, Me And My Army, Meshuggah, Mohammed Ali, Odyssey, Oh Land [DK], Oskar Linnros, Plain White T's [US], Raunchy [DK], Rebecca & Fiona, Riddarna, Sahara Hotnights, Slagsmålsklubben, Stor, Twin Atlantic, The Ark, The Kooks, The Sounds, This is Head, Wolfmother [AU], Young Guns
