= Novarupta (band) =

Swedish band/project from Gothenburg

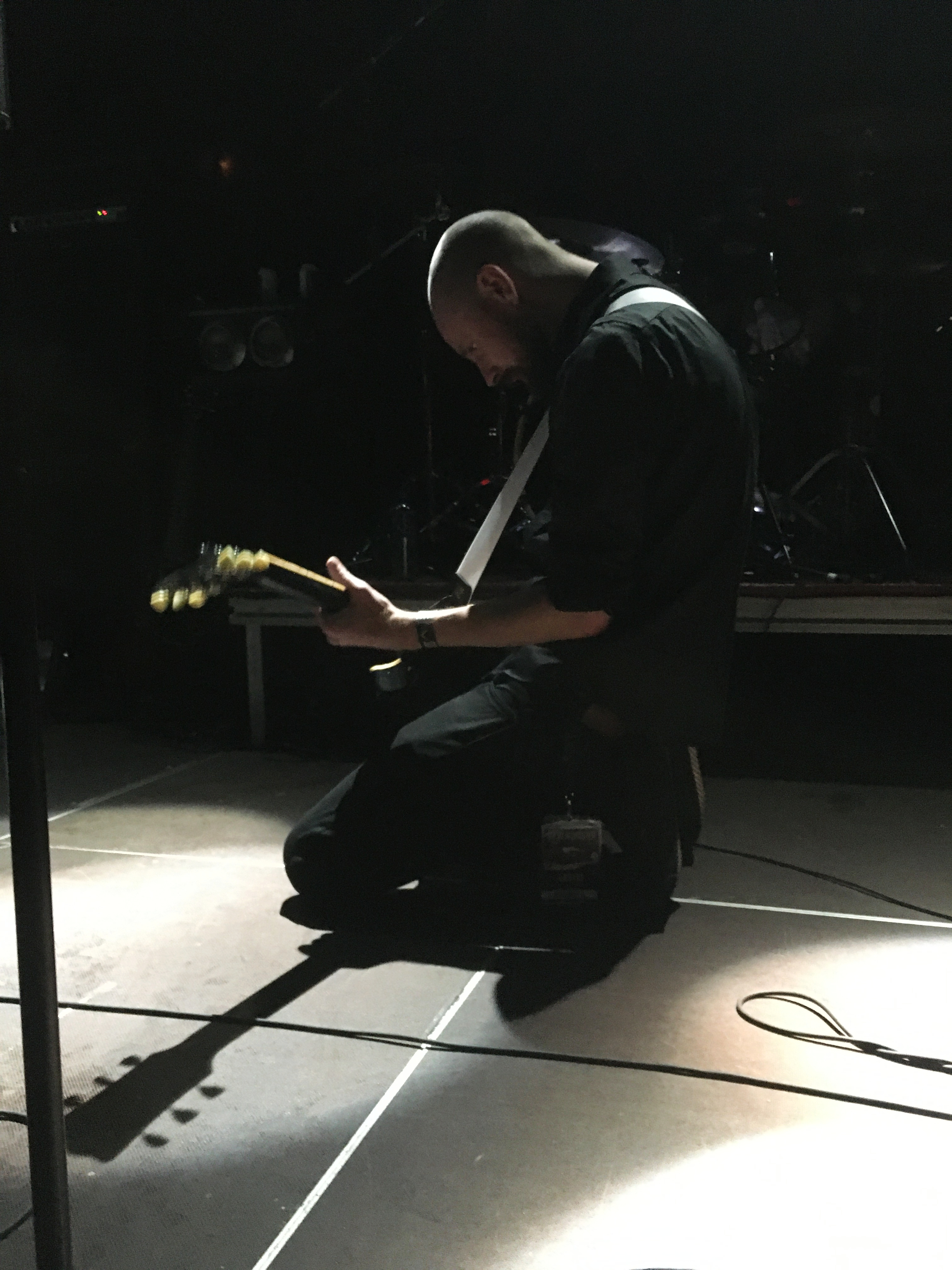
- Alex Stjernfeldt during Novarupta's performance at "15 Years of Mayhem" in 2021

Background information
- Origin: Gothenburg, Sweden
- Genres: Blackened sludge metal, post-metal
- Years active: 2019–2025
- Label: Suicide Records
- Members: Alex Stjernfeldt; Arjen Kunnen

Novarupta was a Swedish progressive post-metal collective founded by the multi-instrumentalist and producer Alex Stjernfeldt (Grand Cadaver, CHILD, Young Acid, SKRCKVLDET, ex-The Moth Gatherer, ex-Let them Hang) and the artist Arjen Kunnen in 2018. The band was known for its conceptual albums, each themed around one of the four classical elements — fire, water, air, and earth — and for its collaborative approach, featuring a rotating cast of guest vocalists from across the metal scene. Two of the band’s albums, Marine Snow and Astral Sands, won at the Manifestgalan, Sweden’s independent music awards.

== History ==
Following his departure from The Moth Gatherer, Alex Stjernfeldt founded Novarupta as a musical outlet focused on slow, heavy, and emotionally intense works. The project began informally during a visit to Stockholm where Stjernfeldt attended a concert by Ulver, evolving into a broader collaboration with Claudio Marino (Tid), who helped shape the concept of using different guest vocalists for each track. The project name is derived from the Novarupta (meaning "newly erupted") volcano in Alaska, which erupted in 1912, leaving a prominent geological scar on the landscape, and it reflects the rebirth of Stjernfeldt's creative endeavours.

=== Disillusioned Fire (2019) ===
Novarupta's debut album, Disillusioned Fire, represents the element of fire. The record emerged from a difficult period in Stjernfeldt's life, and its intense and chaotic sound reflects those struggles. Initially, Stjernfeldt approached the album without a fixed idea of its sound, aiming instead to create an open and collaborative process. As the project evolved, he recognized that both the lyrics and the overall tone reflected the violence and intensity of flames. This realization led to the decision to center the album thematically on fire. Guest vocalists on the album included members from bands such as Dark Tranquillity and Entombed. The album was released through Suicide Records, who picked up the project after hearing an early mix of the first song created for the album, "Urang Medan". Initially the agreement between them was for a single album, but it later expanded to cover the entire four-album journey.

=== Marine Snow (2020) ===
The second album, Marine Snow, continued the elemental theme, this time focusing on water. As Stjernfeldt began composing the early tracks, he was drawn to the imagery of the deep ocean, and the music’s slow, immersive quality evoked a descent into the abyssal sea. The album transitions from the fire of the debut into a "sea of blackened sludge, progressive metal, and monochromatic psychedelia," being described as cohesive and atmospheric. Marine Snow received acclaim for its fluid and coherent sound, which Stjernfeldt described as feeling like a journey from the shoreline to the ocean's depths.

Marine Snow was nominated and won a Manifesgalan award.

=== Carrion Movements (2021) ===
The third entry in the series, Carrion Movements, represents air. Departing from the established sound of the previous albums, Stjernfeldt took a more experimental approach, hinting early on that it may not even include traditional vocals, Indeed, the album featured no vocal contributors, relying instead on ambient textures and instrumental dynamics. The album's title was inspired by recurring sounds during the songwriting process, which resembled movements, while its airy, reverb-heavy textures contributed to its association with the element of air. While the album differed from earlier releases and might have lacked strong commercial appeal, it was supported by Suicide Records and released.

=== Suicide Records' Compilation album (2024) ===
In 2024 Novarupta contributed a new song to the Suicide Records' compilation album In the Loving Memory of You / Time Will Heal, alongside 15 other bands (Skitsystem, Knivad, Demonic Death Judge, M:40, Downfall Of Gaia, Grand Cadaver, Fredag den 13:e, Besvärjelsen, The Moth Gatherer, Fabian Brusk Jahn, Rainbird, Ulmus, Division of Laura Lee, GUHTS, and Firebreather). All proceeds from the album went to the Swedish suicide-prevention non-profit organisation, Suicide Zero. The album was released on 10 September 2024, on the World Suicide Prevention Day.

=== Astral Sands (2025) ===
Astral Sands, released on February 14, 2025, via Suicide Records, is the fourth and final installment in Novarupta's elemental tetralogy, representing the element of earth. The album features nine tracks, each with a different guest vocalist, continuing the project's collaborative approach. Musically, it blends elements of post-metal, gothic rock, and progressive metal, characterized by atmospheric arrangements and a melancholic tone. Critics noted the album's emotional depth and cohesive sound, highlighting tracks like "Seven Collides" and "Endless Joy" for their dynamic compositions, and described the album as concluding the series on a high note. Reviewers described the release as a culmination of Novarupta's conceptual journey through the classical elements.

Astral Sands was nominated and won at the Manifestgalan awards 2026.

=== Novarupta legacy ===
Stjernfeldt has stated that the completion of the fourth album will mark the conclusion of Novarupta's discography. While no further albums are planned, he noted that "the band will not be anymore but it will exist," suggesting that the project may continue in some other form.

=== Standalone tracks ===
Novarupta has released three standalone tracks on April 1 in consecutive years: "The Colour Void" (2019), "Wear You Down" (2020), and "Satanic Volcanic" (2021). Originally created as a lighthearted experiment, "The Colour Void" began as a spontaneous recording session, which Stjernfeldt later decided to release as an April Fool’s Day joke. The tradition continued in subsequent years, with each track serving as a form of experimental release outside the main discography. While the songs are not humorous in content, Stjernfeldt has described them as a "meta-joke"—an extension of the Novarupta universe that does not affect the core conceptual narrative.

== Musical Style and Themes ==
Novarupta blends elements of post-metal, sludge, and atmospheric metal. Each album is structured around a classical element and includes collaborations with various guest vocalists, each contributing lyrics and vocal performances that match the thematic content of the music. Stjernfeldt composes and performs the instrumental portions, often producing the albums himself.

== Live Performances ==
Although originally conceived as a studio project, Novarupta has performed live on select occasions. The first performance took place on 8 November 2019 and involved a 12-person lineup, including four instrumentalists and eight guest vocalists who rotated performances, reflecting the collaborative nature of the studio album. The second performance was part of Suicide Records' "15 Years of Mayhem" festival, that took place on 15 October 2021. The third, and final, performance for Novarupta took place on 8 November 2025, at Monument 031 in Gothenburg, with Voldet and Division of Laura Lee as supports. In total 19 people (10 instrumentalists and 9 vocalists) performed during Novarupta's final show.

== Discography ==
=== Studio albums ===
- Disillusioned Fire (2019)
- Marine Snow (2020)
- Carrion Movements (2022)
- Astral Sands (2025)

=== EPs ===
- Iron Ghosts (2023)

=== Singles ===
- Pyroclastic Flows (2019)
- Ourang Medan (2019)
- Mare Tranquillitatis (2019)
- Broken Blue Cascades (2020)
- Every Shade of Water (2020)
- The Color Void (2020)
- Wear You Down (2021)
- Satanic Volcanic (2022)
- Feel My Love (Novarupta Reimagining) (2023)

=== Compilation appearances ===
- In the Loving Memory of You (2024)

== Awards and nominations ==
Year	Award	Category	Album	Result
2021	Manifestgalan	Best Metal Album	Marine Snow	Won
2026	Manifestgalan	Best Metal Album	Astral Sands	Won

== Members ==
=== Core members ===
- Alex Stjernfeldt – guitars, bass, drums, production
- Arjen Kunnen – visual art, concept development

=== Frequent collaborators ===
Novarupta featured numerous members / guest musicians and vocalists across its four albums, including members of

- Dark Tranquillity
- Entombed
- Domkraft
- The Moth Gatherer
- Satan takes a Holiday
- Division of Laura Lee

Live performances expanded the lineup significantly, at times involving over a dozen musicians and vocalists to reflect the collaborative nature of the band.
