= The Moth Gatherer =

Swedish post-sludge metal band

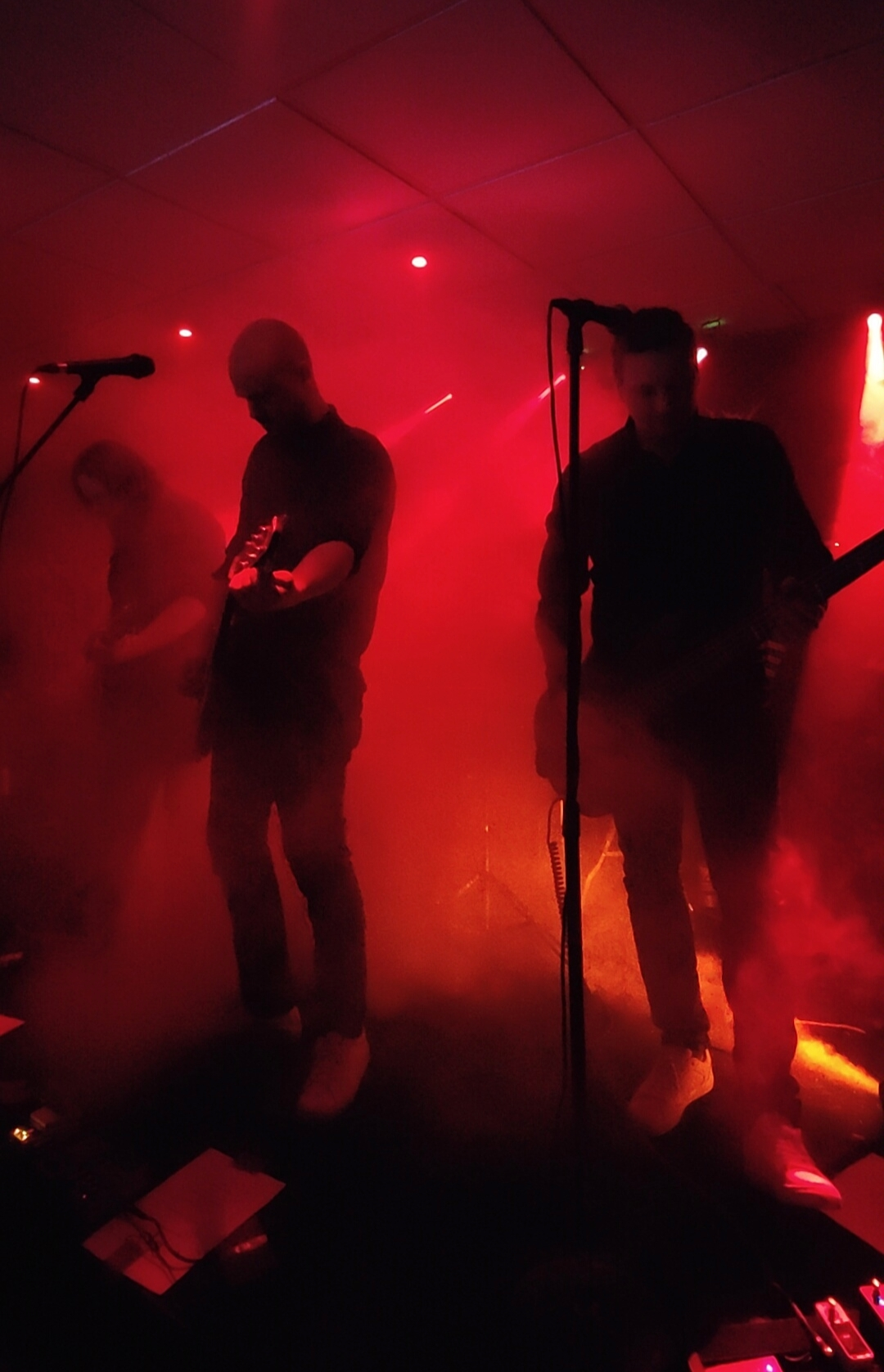
- The Moth Gatherer live at Klubb Fredagsmangel, Stockholm (23 Feb. 2023)

Background information
- Origin: Stockholm, Sweden
- Genres: Post-metal; Sludge metal
- Years active: 2008–present
- Label: Agonia Records
- Members: Victor Wegeborn; Svante Karlsson; Ronny Westphal; Henrik Ekholm
- Past members: Alex Stjernfeldt; Dan Hemgren
- Website: themothgatherer.com

The Moth Gatherer is a post-metal band from Stockholm, Sweden, formed in 2008 by Victor Wegeborn and Alex Stjernfeldt. In mid 2013, Svante Karlsson joined the band. Initially conceived as a therapeutic project to cope with personal loss, the band's music blends elements of post-metal, sludge, doom, and electronic influences. The band's lyrics often explore themes of human suffering and existential reflection.

Their debut album A Bright Celestial Light (2013) was followed by The Earth Is the Sky (2015), which received critical acclaim for its atmospheric and layered compositions. After lineup changes, including the departure of Stjernfeldt, the band released Esoteric Oppression (2019), further refining their sound. Known for their emotive themes and expansive soundscapes, The Moth Gatherer has collaborated with various artists and continues to contribute to the post-metal genre.

== History ==
The Moth Gatherer was founded in Stockholm in 2008 by Victor Wegeborn and Alex Stjernfeldt. They started The Moth Gatherer as a sort of therapy, a way to deal with the loss of people they loved and the hole it left behind. The Moth Gatherer was a way for Alex and Victor to move on. During 2009 and 2010 they explored their sound, and in mid-2010 they began recording what was to become their debut A Bright Celestial Light. It was released in April 2013 through Agonia Records, and it contains 5 songs in a 45-minute play time. The band's evolutionary sound and atmospheric songwriting received critical attention, with reviewers describing the album as a cathartic journey and drawing musical comparisons to Cult of Luna and Neurosis.

About the name "The Moth Gatherer" Stjernfeldt commented in an interview: "When you lose someone, a lot of things in your world is upside down, and it’s hard to see something positive. You also get a lot of questions about why? More or less, we fumble in darkness. Moths always searches for a source of light, like you do. So for me, the name stands for a search for hope". In another interview Karlsson commented that the band's name symbolizes the search for light in darkness, akin to a moth drawn to a flame.

On November 27, 2015, The Moth Gatherer released their second album, The Earth Is The Sky. The band choose Karl Daniel Lidén once again for mixing and mastering, notable for his work with Dozer and Switchblade. The new album features guest appearances from members of Terra Tenebrosa, Monolord, Kongh and more. The album was met with critical acclaim from magazines and fans worldwide, and ended up in many Album of The Month and Album of The Year charts.

In early 2017 they announced a new EP called The Comfortable Low featuring Dennis Lyxzén (Refused, INVSN) and Fred Burman (Satan Takes A Holiday). It was released worldwide on Agonia Records on March 31, 2017.

In 2019 they released their third album, Esoteric Oppression, in which they fuse doom metal with atmospheric elements, sludge, and post-metal, resulting to a creative work that balances heaviness with subtle, melodic passages. The album was described as bleak and immersive, capturing themes of desolation and internal struggle. The band was noted for its willingness to explore bleak and dystopian soundscapes while incorporating elements of drone and industrial music. Sputnikmusic praised it as the album where the band "truly perfect that balance between heaviness, melodic post-rock and overall patience in their songwriting," highlighting the band's evolution and the mastering work by Cult of Luna's Magnus Lindberg. The album was also praised for its effective use of tension and musical texture, as well for its mastered post-metal composition, making it able to maintain freshness through varied pacing and dynamic contrasts.

In 2024 the band contributed with a new, unreleased song to the Suicide Records compilation album In the Loving Memory of You / Time Will Heal, alongside 15 other bands (Skitsystem, Knivad, Demonic Death Judge, M:40, Downfall Of Gaia, Grand Cadaver, Fredag den 13:e, Besvärjelsen, Novarupta, Fabian Brusk Jahn, Rainbird, Ulmus, Division of Laura Lee, GUHTS, and Firebreather). All proceeds from the album went to the Swedish suicide-prevention non-profit organisation, Suicide Zero. The album was released on 10 September 2024, on the World Suicide Prevention Day.

In 2025 they contributed to the compilation album of Nine Inch Nails songs covers, Best Of Nine Inch Nails (Redux), with 12 other bands. The album was released on 28 November 2025.

== Members ==
- Victor Wegeborn – vocals, guitar, programming
- Svante Karlsson – drums 2014–present
- Ronny Westphal – guitar 2015–present
- Henrik Ekholm – bass 2022–present

== Previous members ==
- Alex Stjernfeldt – vocals, bass 2008–2018
- Dan Hemgren – bass 2018–2021

== Discography ==
- A Bright Celestial Light (Album, April 16, 2013)
- The Earth Is The Sky (Album, November 27, 2015)
- The Comfortable Low (EP, March 31, 2017)
- Esoteric Oppression (Album, February 22, 2019)
- In the Loving Memory of You / Time Will Heal (Song for Compilation Album, September 10, 2024)
- Best Of Nine Inch Nails (Redux) (Song for Compilation Album, November 24, 2025)
