= Ali Mohamed =

Ali Mohamed, Ali Muhammad, Ali Mohammed, or Ali Mohammad may refer to:

== Ali Mohamed ==
=== Mohamed as surname ===
- Ali Mohamed (double agent) (born 1952)
- Ali Mohamed (footballer) (born 1995), Nigerien footballer
- Ali Adnan Mohamed, Iraqi archer
- Ali Moalim Mohamed, Somali businessman and politician
- Ali Mohamud Mohamed, Kenyan politician
- Ali Naseer Mohamed (born 1969), Maldivian diplomat
- Ali Yassin Mohamed (born 1965), Somali-Swedish Islamist militant

=== Mohamed as middle name or Ali Mohamed as given name ===
- Ali Mohamed Al-Balooshi (born 1987), Emirati middle-distance runner
- Ali Mohamed Daoud, also known as Jean-Marie (born 1950), Djiboutian politician
- Ali Mohamed Hufane (born 1960), Somali long-distance runner
- Ali Mohamed Jaffer (born 1955), South Yemeni boxer
- Ali Mohamed Mohamud, Somali politician
- Ali Mohamed Muheeb, Egyptian diver
- Ali Mohamed Osoble, Somali politician
- Ali Mohamed Shein (born 1948), 7th President of Zanzibar from 2010 to 2020
- Ali Mohamed Yussuf (born 1952), more commonly known as Ali Guray, Somaliland politician
- Ali Mohamed Warancadde, Somali politician

=== Ali Mohamed as a surname ===
- Abdallah Ali Mohamed (born 1999), Comorian footballer
- Abdullahi Ali Mohamed, Somali politician
- Ali Heidar Ali Mohamed, Kuwaiti judoka

== Ali Mohammad ==
- Ali Mohammad (Afghan politician)
- The Báb (ʻAlí-Muḥammad, 1819–1850), founder of Bábism
- Ali Mohammad Dar, Indian politician
- Ali Mohammad Dastgheib Shirazi, (born 1935), Iranian Grand Ayatollah and Twelver Shi'a Marja
- Ali Mohammad Afghani (born 1925), Iranian writer
- Ali-Mohammad Khademi (1913–1978), Iranian businessman, general manager of Iran Air
- Ali Mohammad Mahar (1967–2019), Pakistani politician
- Ali Mohammad Momeni (born 1937), Iranian wrestler
- Ali Mohammad Sagar, member of Jammu and Kashmir Legislative Assembly
- Ali Mohammad Shahbaz (Ali Mohammad Qureshi, 1939–1996), pen name Shahbaz, Kashmiri revolutionary poet
- Ali Mohammad (West Bengal politician)
- Hakeem Ali Mohammad (1906–1988), Indian Unani physician (hakeem)
- Bobby Dixon (born 1983), Turkish basketball player also known as Ali Muhammed

== Ali Mohammed ==
- Ali Mohammed Ghedi (born 1952), or Ali Gedi, Prime Minister of the Transitional Federal Government of Somalia from 2004 to 2007

== See also ==
- Mohammad Ali (disambiguation)
