= Black City =

Black City may refer to:

- Black City (Division of Laura Lee album), 2002
- Black City (Matthew Dear album), 2010
- Black City, a song by Mustasch, from the album Ratsafari, 2003
- Black City (band), Danish rockband
- Chicago, Illinois, as referred to before the 1893 World's Fair, e.g., in The Devil in the White City
- Black City (Baku), a mainly industrial neighbourhood of Baku, Azerbaijan
- Black City (film), a 1961 Italian comedy-drama film
- A fekete város, a Hungarian novel by Kálmán Mikszáth, 1910
- Khara-Khoto, a former city in Inner Mongolia that was visited by Marco Polo
- Tthe Zra¸y Kek’it (Black City), a settlement in Yukon, Canada, part of the Tr’ondëk-Klondike UNESCO World Heritage Site
- Necrus, a fictional city in the DC Comics film Aquaman and the Lost Kingdom, 2023
