= CEMB =

CEMB may refer to:

- Center for Applied and Molecular Biology
- Centre of Excellence in Molecular Biology
- Council of Ex-Muslims of Britain
