= Mahmud Ali =

Mahmud Ali may refer to:

- Mahmud Ali (politician) (1919–2006), Pakistani politician
- Mahmud Ali (village) (also Romanized as Maḩmūd ʿAlī), a village in Mazu Rural District, Alvar-e Garmsiri District, Andimeshk County, Khuzestan Province, Iran
- Kalateh-ye Mahmud Ali (also Romanized as Kalāteh-ye Maḩmūd ‘Alī; also known as Maḩmūd ‘Alī and Mahmood Ali), a village in Meyghan Rural District, in the Central District of Nehbandan County, South Khorasan Province, Iran
- Mahmood Ali, Pakistani artist

== See also ==
- Mehmood Ali (disambiguation)
- Muhammad Ali (disambiguation)
