= Grand Cadaver =

Swedish death metal supergroup

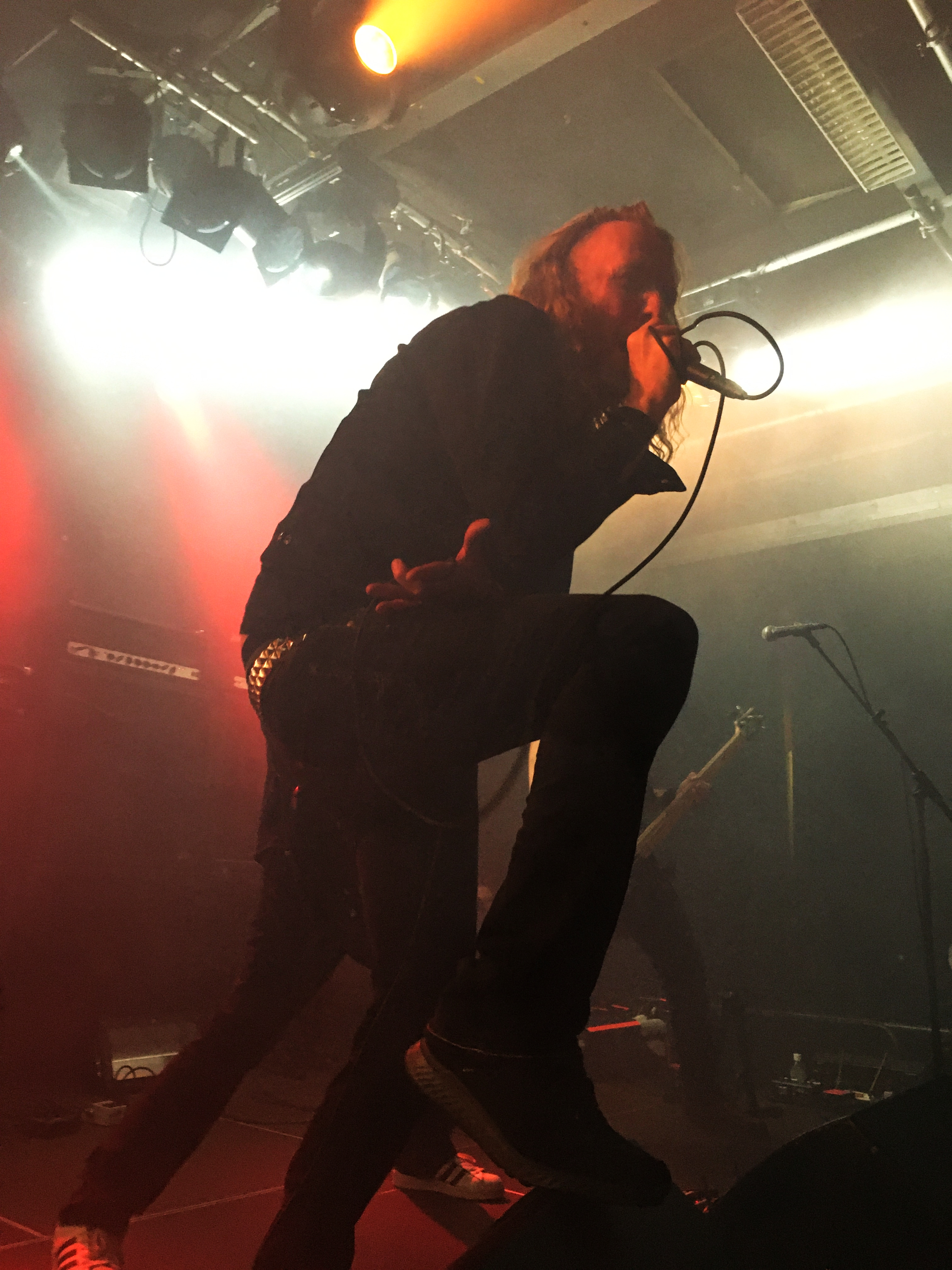
- Grand Cadaver's Mikael Stanne during their first live show, 2021

Background information
- Origin: Sweden
- Genres: Death metal
- Years active: 2020–present
- Labels: Majestic Mountain, Hammerheart
- Spinoff of: Dark Tranquillity; Katatonia; The Halo Effect; Treblinka
- Members: Mikael Stanne; Stefan Lagergren; Alex Stjernfeldt; Christian Jansson; Daniel Liljekvist
- Website: www.grandcadaver.com

Grand Cadaver is a Swedish death metal supergroup formed in 2020. Made up of Swedish artists, their sounds are based in the early Stockholm death scene music. The group consists of Mikael Stanne, Christian Jansson, Stefan Lagergren, Daniel Liljekvist, and Alex Stjernfeldt.

== History ==
The band was formed during the COVID-19 pandemic in 2020 by Alex Stjernfeldt and Daniel Liljekvist. They invited Stefan Lagergren, Christian Jansson, and Mikael Stanne to join the group.

The band planned to release an EP as a side-project during the pandemic since tours were on hold. The band produced their debut album, Into The Maw of Death on 29 October 2021, and the music earned the "Best Metal" at the 2022 Manifest awards.

After the pandemic, they recorded a follow-up album, Deities of Deathlike Sleep in 2022, and was released on 29 August 2023. One of the album's songs, "Reign Through Fire", was released as a seven inch single, with a cover of Nihilist's "Supposed To Rot" on the B-side. The cover song was dedicated to Lars-Göran Petrov as a celebration of life and his years of service to death metal.

In 2024 the band contributed with a new, unreleased song to the Suicide Records compilation album In the Loving Memory of You / Time Will Heal, alongside 15 other bands (Skitsystem, Knivad, Demonic Death Judge, M:40, Downfall Of Gaia, The Moth Gatherer, Fredag den 13:e, Besvärjelsen, Novarupta, Fabian Brusk Jahn, Rainbird, Ulmus, Division of Laura Lee, GUHTS, and Firebreather). All proceeds from the album went to the Swedish suicide-prevention non-profit organisation, Suicide Zero. The album was released on 10 September 2024, on the World Suicide Prevention Day.

On 23 May 2025, the band released the single "The Rot Beneath", the second track from their upcoming EP of the same name, The Rot Beneath. The title reflects a commentary on contemporary global issues, describing the EP as "an anthem to mankind’s demise" and exploring themes of societal decay, conflict, and human responsibility. On 9 July 2025 they released "Darkened Apathy", the fourth track from the upcoming EP. The EP The Rot Beneath is scheduled for release on 15 August 2025. The band stated that they opted for an EP format rather than a full album due to time constraints, recording the four tracks together in a single weekend. They described The Rot Beneath as a more streamlined and furious release, thematically more political in response to contemporary world events.

On 7 July 2026 the band announced a partnership with Hammerheart Records, and that they are working on a. New album, to be released in 2027.

== Members ==
=== Current members ===
- Mikael Stanne (Dark Tranquillity, The Halo Effect, Cemetery Skyline) – lead vocals (2020–present)
- Stefan Lagergren (The Grifted, ex-Treblinka/Tiamat) – guitar (2020–present)
- Alex Stjernfeldt (Novarupta, CHILD) – guitar (2020–present)
- Christian Jansson (Dark Tranquillity, Pagandom) – bass (2020–present)
- Daniel Liljekvist (Disrupted, ex-Katatonia) – drums (2020–present)

=== Live members ===
- Andreas Baier (Besvärjelsen, Hilning, Vorder) – bass (2021, 2024)
- Per Stålberg (Division of Laura Lee) – guitar (2022)

== Discography ==
=== Studio albums ===
- Into the Maw of Death (2021)
- Deities of Deathlike Sleep (2023)

=== EPs ===
- Madness Comes (2021)
- The Rot Beneath (2025)

=== Singles ===
- Fields of the Undying (2020)
- Blood-Filled Skies (2020)
- Reign Through Fire (2021)
- Grim Eternal (2021)
- Empire of Lies (2021)
- Serrated Jaws (2023)
- The Wishful Dead (2023)
- Vortex of Blood (2023)
- A Crawling Feast of Decay (2023)
- Terminal Exit / Skinless Gods (2024)

=== Compilation albums ===
- Legacy #130 (2020)
- Worldwide Underground Against War (2022)
- In the Loving Memory of You (2024)
