= UKN =

UKN may refer to:

- University of Kang Ning, Tainan, Taiwan
- Ukraine Air Enterprise, an airline (by ICAO airline designator)
- Waukon Municipal Airport, an airport in Iowa (by IATA airport code)
- Mohammed Ali (duo), a Swedish hip hop duo earlier known as UKN
- United Kingdom Navy
