= Tazagram, Lower Dir District =

Village in Khyber Pakhtunkhwa, Pakistan

Tazagram
- Union Council
- Country: Pakistan
- Province: Khyber Pakhtunkhwa
- District: Lower Dir
- Time zone: UTC+5 (PST)

Tazagram تازگرام
- Village
- Country: Pakistan
- Province: Khyber Pakhtunkhwa
- District: Lower Dir
- Tehsil: Adenzai

Population
  - Total: 7,500 (approx.)
- Time zone: UTC+5 (PST)

Tazagram (Urdu: تازگرام) is a village located in the Lower Dir District of the Khyber Pakhtunkhwa province in Pakistan. It forms part of Tehsil Adenzai and serves as the namesake for the Union Council Tazagram. The village is situated along the Asbanr Road, which connects the districts of Lower Dir and Swat.

== Geography ==
Tazagram is the largest village and commercial center within its Union Council. It comprises approximately 1,000 households with an estimated population of around 7,500 residents. The village is bordered by Qala Kityari to the north, Shah Alam Baba to the east, Jango to the south, and Ouch to the west. The eastern side of the village consists mainly of mountainous terrain, while the western side features agricultural land. A seasonal water stream (khwar in the local language) flows through the eastern part of the village during the rainy season.

== Education ==
Tazagram is noted for its high literacy rate, which exceeds 90%. The village hosts four government schools—two for boys and two for girls—as well as four private institutions. Iqra Public School is the oldest and largest among the private schools in the area.

== Economy ==
Agriculture forms the backbone of Tazagram’s economy. The main crops include wheat, maize, tomatoes, onions, vegetables, and other cash crops. Livestock farming supports approximately 5% of the population. In addition to agriculture, a significant portion of the residents are employed in education, the military, healthcare, government services, transport, and the private sector.

Tazagram also functions as a local business hub, with shops and enterprises dealing in garments, footwear, meat, food items, and other essential goods. A considerable number of inhabitants work overseas—particularly in Saudi Arabia, the United Arab Emirates, Qatar, Oman, and other Middle East countries—contributing remittances that play an important role in the local economy. Approximately 40% of the population consists of youth.

== Notable people ==
Tazagram has produced several notable figures in various professional fields, including:

- Dr. Muhammad Idrees – Director, Centre of Excellence in Molecular Biology, University of the Punjab; former Vice Chancellor of University of Peshawar and Hazara University; former Chairman, Pakistan Science Foundation; and founder of Genome Laboratory.
- Engineer Bakht Rehman – Former Director, Quaid-i-Azam University, Islamabad.
- Professor Rahi Shah – Former Principal, Government Degree College Gulabad.
- Dr. Sardar Ali Khan – Specialist Endocrinologist and Medical Consultant.
- Dr. Rai Shah – Swat Central Hospital.
- Mr. Altaf Hussain Khan – Local political figure.
- Mohammad Ishaq – Waste management and recycling specialist based in the United Arab Emirates.
- Colonel (Retd.) Qaisar Khan – Officer, Pakistan Army.
- Colonel Azhar Khan – Officer, Pakistan Army.
- Mr. Zahoor Khan – Humanitarian worker.

== See also ==
- Lower Dir District
- Adenzai Tehsil
- Swat District
- Khyber Pakhtunkhwa
