= Mohammed Ali (duo) =

Swedish hip hop duo

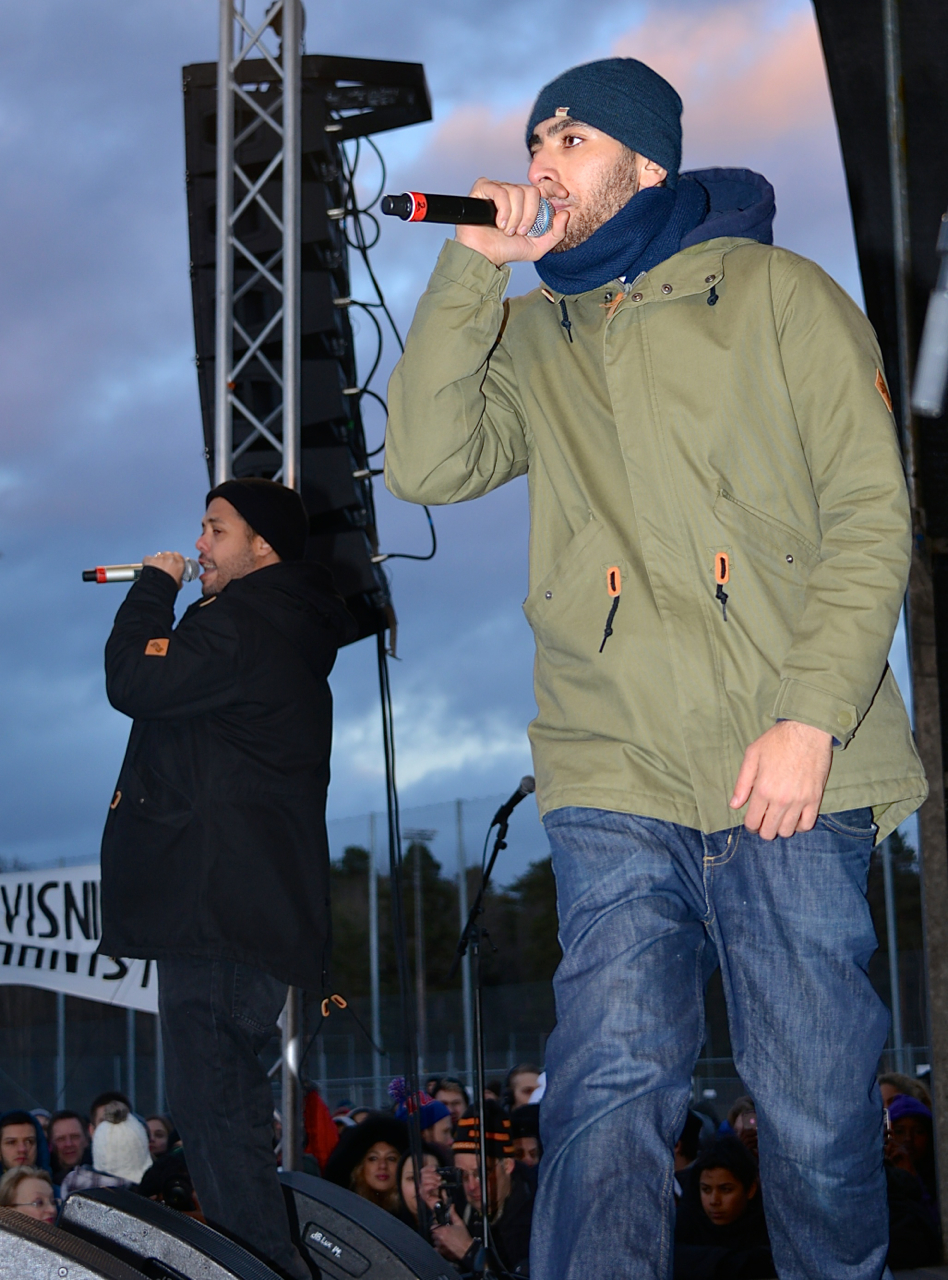
- Mohammed Ali in the anti-racist demonstration in Kärrtorp,2013

Background information
- Origin: Flemingsberg, Stockholm, Sweden
- Genres: Hip hop
- Years active: 2009 – present
- Labels: Bad Taste Records
- Members: Moms; Alias Ruggig
- Website: mohammedali.se

Mohammed Ali is a Swedish hip hop duo that has its roots in Flemingsberg, south of Stockholm (part of Metropolitan Stockholm area). The Mohammed Ali duo, consists of Moms (Mohammed Anwar Ryback) and Alias Ruggig (Rawa Farok Mohamed Ali). Mohammed Ali duo is also part of the Swedish hip hop collective Ayla.

The duo was known early on as UKN, but changed its name to Mohammed Ali. In 2009 the duo released their critically praised debut mixtape Process mostly produced by Mack Beats. The mixtape was distributed free of charge via the Swedish hip hop/urban networking site whoa.nu.

In 2011, Mohammed Ali released their first studio album Vi (We) on Bad Taste Records / Border and produced by Mack Beats, The Salazar Brothers, DJ Lastword and Astma and featured artists like Robert Athill, Kristin Amparo, Samson For President and Asha Ali. The album, launched on 13 April 2011 was very well received by critics and entered the Sverigetopplistan, the official Swedish Albums Chart at No. 41 (chart dated 22 April 2011). The first official single from the album was "Kan någon ringa (112)" (Can someone call (112)). It was followed by "Gatan sjunger ut" and "Postkodsmiljonär" both produced by Masse. A music video was shot, directed by Daniel Jigenstedt.

== Discography ==
=== Albums ===
- 2009: Processen (mixtape)

Track list:

1. "Lever för det här" feat. Danjah (prod. Mack Beats)
2. "Porten" feat. Nano (prod. Mack Beats)
3. "Ta dig genom dan" (prod. Mack Beats)
4. "Hinna hinna" (prod. Mack Beats)
5. "Tar dig dit" feat. Danjah (prod. Mack Beats)
6. "Kollar ner mot mig" feat. Carlito (prod. Christian L)
7. "Vara med dig" feat. Stor (prod. Mack Beats)
8. "Följer mig med blicken" feat. Beldina Malaika (prod. Masse)
9. "Alla jagar efter nått" (prod. Mack Beats)
10. "Flos" (prod. Masse)
11. "Tror om mig" feat. Stor & Nano (prod. Mack Beats)
- 2011: Vi (debut studio album)

Track list:

1. "Intro (Reflektioner)" feat. Kristin Amparo (5:15)
2. "Drömmen var långt bort" feat. Linn (4:15)
3. "Kan någon ringa (112)" feat. Asha Ali (3:59)
4. "Ghettobarn Interlude" (1:26)
5. "Ghettobarn" (4:04)
6. "Postkodsmiljonär" (4:12)
7. "Gatan sjunger ut" (4:22)
8. "Sista resan" (4:28)
9. "Flykten" feat. Samson for President (3:53)
10. "Svartskalle och kriminell" (5:27)
11. "Tunga steg" feat. Robert Athill (4:00)
12. "Kan inte säga nej" (6:01)
13. "K.V.I.N.N.A" (3:34)
14. "Nästa gång" feat. Jeppe Körsbär (5:15)
15. "Vackert" (4:01)
16. "Himlen" feat. Robert Athill (5:38)

=== Singles / Videography ===
- 2009: "Hinna hinna"
- 2009: "Lever för det här" feat. Danjah
- 2011: "Kan Någon Ringa (112)" feat. Asha Ali
- 2011: "Gatan sjunger ut"
- 2011: "Postkodsmiljonär"
