= Sajida al-Rishawi =

Iraqi attempted suicide bomber

- Born: Sajida Mubarak Atrous al-Rishawi c. 1970; Ba'athist Iraq
- Died: 4 February 2015 (aged 44–45); Swaqa Prison, Jordan
- Cause of death: Execution by hanging
- Occupation: Suicide bomber
- Known for: Attempted suicide bombing in the 2005 Amman bombings
- Spouse: Ali Hussein Ali al-Shamari

Sajida Mubarak Atrous al-Rishawi (Arabic: ساجدة مبارك عطروس الريشاوي; c. 1970 – 4 February 2015) was an attempted suicide bomber and an Islamic terrorist.

She was convicted of possessing explosives and intending to commit a terrorist act in the 9 November 2005 Amman bombings in Jordan that killed 60 people and injured 115 others, having survived when her explosive belt failed to detonate. Al-Qaeda in Iraq claimed responsibility for the triple bombings that simultaneously hit three nearby hotels, and said they carried out the attack because the hotels were "a secure place for the filthy Israeli and Western tourists to spread corruption and adultery at the expense and suffering of the Muslims in these countries."

== Background and Amman bombings ==
Al-Rishawi and her husband Ali Hussein Ali al-Shamari are thought to have been Iraqi citizens and had Iraqi accents. According to her confession they traveled on forged passports to Jordan about five days before the bombings. She, along with her husband, entered the Amman Radisson Hotel ballroom during a wedding. When she had trouble detonating her suicide belt, her husband pushed her out of the room before detonating a bomb that killed 38 people.

== Court proceedings ==
Al-Rishawi was later captured by Jordanian authorities and confessed on national television. She was shown making a filmed confession with an apparent suicide bomb device around her and a detonator in hand showing that the device failed to explode, but later retracted her confession.

She was convicted of possessing explosives and intending to commit a terrorist attack, and sentenced to death by hanging by a Jordanian military court on 21 September 2006. She appealed this conviction but her appeal was dismissed in January 2007. At the time of her execution, she was still engaged in the process of appeal of her sentence.

== ISIL membership ==
Al-Rishawi was reportedly the sister of a former close aide of deceased al-Qaeda in Iraq leader Abu Musab al-Zarqawi, named by some reports as Mubarak Atrous al-Rishawi, who was killed by US forces in Iraq.

On 24 January 2015, the Islamic State of Iraq and the Levant (ISIL) offered to trade Japanese journalist Kenji Goto and spare Royal Jordanian Air Force Lieutenant Muath al-Kasasbeh for the release of Sajida al-Rishawi. Jordan put forward the option of exchanging al-Rishawi for al-Kasasbeh. The proposed exchange did not go further because ISIL failed to give plausible proof of al-Kasasbeh being alive; Goto was beheaded in late January 2015 and ISIL released video footage in early February 2015 of al-Kasasbeh being burned alive, although Jordanian intelligence officials reported his killing took place in early January 2015.

== Execution ==
Al-Rishawi and Ziad Khalaf Raja al-Karbouly were executed by hanging in the early morning on 4 February 2015, which was expedited in retaliation for the burning death of al-Kasasbeh by ISIL.

== See also ==
- Female suicide bombers
