= Mehmood Ali (disambiguation) =

Mehmood Ali (1932–2004) was an Indian actor, singer, director and producer known as Mehmood.

Mehmood Ali may also refer to:

- Mehmood Ali Family, his family, an Indian film family
- Mehmood Ali (footballer), Pakistani footballer

== See also ==
- Mahmud Ali (disambiguation)
- Mahmood Ali, Pakistani artist
- Mahmood Ali (Indian politician), Indian politician
