= Ali Hussein Ali al-Shamari =

Iraqi militant

- Died: November 9, 2005; Amman, Jordan
- Cause of death: Suicide bombing
- Occupation: Militant
- Known for: Suicide bombing in 2005 Amman bombings
- Spouse: Sajida Mubarak Atrous al-Rishawi

Ali Hussein Ali al-Shamari was an Iraqi militant, apparently one of the people who carried out the 2005 Amman bombings at the Radisson Hotel. He was married to Sajida Mubarak Atrous al-Rishawi, who failed to detonate her explosives belt in the same attack as her husband and was arrested by Jordanian police. Ali had used a 10 kg explosives-packed belt wrapped around his waist.

== Attack ==
The two lingered outside the Philadelphia Ballroom, where Mr Ashraf Akhras and his bride, Nadia, were celebrating their wedding with some 300 Jordanian and Palestinian guests. They drew the suspicion of a hotel clerk, who asked what they were looking for. Ali Hussein replied that they were Iraqis and had never seen a Jordanian wedding party and asked if they could have a look, the security official said, citing witnesses and video camera footage obtained from blast site.

Once inside, they staked out different parts of the ballroom. Ali Hussein took up position on the right, where men were sitting in the gathering, which was segregated in line with conservative Islamic tradition. He was talking on his handphone constantly, witnesses told police. His wife, meanwhile, found a seat on the left, near chatting women and a handful of playing children. But when the moment arrived for her to trigger her explosives belt, there was a problem. She gestured to her husband that it wouldn't explode. The couple met up near the doorway to the ballroom, and guests told the police they saw the husband angrily gesture towards the woman, telling her to leave. As she moved towards the door, the lights went out and her husband jumped up onto a nearby dining table and detonated his belt, sending the ceiling crashing down and spraying ball-bearings across the room. It was not clear why the lights went out just before the blast, which killed at least 36 people, including the fathers of the bride and groom.

In a televised confession aired after her arrest four days later, Sajida said, "My husband detonated (his bomb), I tried to explode (my belt) but it wouldn't."
