= I Was So Unpopular in School and Now They're Giving Me This Beautiful Bicycle =

Studio album by Billie the Vision and the Dancers
- Released: 2004
- Genre: Indiepop
- Label: Love Will Pay the Bills

Billie the Vision and the Dancers chronology
I Was So Unpopular in School and Now They're Giving Me This Beautiful Bicycle (2004)	The World According to Pablo (2005)

I Was So Unpopular in School and Now They're Giving Me This Beautiful Bicycle is the debut album of Swedish indiepop group Billie the Vision and the Dancers recorded in the spring of 2004. It was released on the record label Love Will Pay the Bills.

In the summer of 2009, the song "Summercat" became popular in Spain thanks to its use in an advertising campaign of Estrella Damm.

== Track listing ==
1. "Summercat" - 3:02
2. "Good and Bad" - 3:16
3. "Nobel Square" - 3:41
4. "Ask for More" - 3:48
5. "Do You Remember" - 4:41
6. "Stay Awake" - 3:15
7. "City" - 4:08
8. "Apologize" - 3:27
9. "No One Knows You" - 4:53
10. "Jackass" - 3:12
11. "Want to Cannot Help but Dance" - 4:06
