= Muhammad Ali (academic) =

Pakistani academic

Prof. Dr. Muhammad Ali SI, TI

Vice Chancellor of the University of the Punjab

Personal details
- Born: Chiniot, Punjab, Pakistan
- Parent: Syed Sultan Shah (father)
- Education: University of Punjab; University of Wales; University of Missouri
- Occupation: Academic, biologist
- Profession: Professor
- Known for: Molecular biology and genetics research
- Awards: Sitara-e-Imtiaz; Tamgha-e-Imtiaz

Muhammad Ali is a Pakistani academic and biologist. He is a recipient of the Sitara-e-Imtiaz and Tamgha-e-Imtiaz. He is a professor at the Centre of Excellence in Molecular Biology (CEMB) at the University of the Punjab, Lahore (UPL).

== Early life ==
Ali received an MSc from the University of the Punjab, Lahore. He obtained a PhD in Biological Sciences from the University of Wales, in 1999, and later completed postdoctoral research at the University of Missouri.

== Career ==
Ali began his academic career as a lecturer at Lawrence College, Murree. He held academic and administrative positions at several universities in Pakistan. He served as vice chancellor of multiple universities, including Quaid-i-Azam University, Government College University Faisalabad, Bahauddin Zakariya University , Multan, and the UPL.

At UPL he served as Vice Chancellor and as a professor associated with the CEMB (Centre of Excellence in Molecular Biology) where he also served as Chairman of the Board of Governors.

== Research ==
Ali's research interests include molecular biology, genetics and fisheries. He authored research publications on molecular biology and genetics.

Ali published more than 1,140 research articles and received more than 12,000 citations.

== Recognition ==
- Sitara-e-Imtiaz
- Tamgha-e-Imtiaz.
- Pakistan Academy of Sciences Gold Medal
- Best University Teacher

== Professional service ==
Ali is associated with the Pakistan Academy of Sciences. He served on academic and administrative bodies, including university syndicates, senates and academic boards. He chaired the Punjab Accreditation Committee.
