= Brandon del Pozo =

American police and health researcher

Personal details
- Born: 1974 (age 51–52)
- Spouse: Sarah Carnevale (2002–present)
- Education: Dartmouth College (BA); Harvard University (MPA); John Jay College (MA); CUNY Graduate Center (MPhil, PhD)
- Website: Official website

Brandon del Pozo (born 1974) is an assistant professor of Medicine, and Health Services, Policy, and Practice (Research) at the Warren Alpert Medical School of Brown University, and a research scientist at Brown University Health. He is also a faculty member of Georgetown University's Graduate School of Arts and Sciences.

Prior to research, del Pozo was the chief of police of Burlington, Vermont, for four years, and served with the New York City Police Department from 1997 to 2015, where he commanded patrol precincts in the Bronx and Manhattan.

Del Pozo is an elected member of the national Council on Criminal Justice, a Law Enforcement Advancing Data and Science (LEADS) Academic at the National Institute of Justice, and was a 2022-2023 LEAP Investigator at the National Institute on Drug Abuse. He has received recognition for his leadership from the Police Executive Research Forum.

== Early life and education ==
Born in the Bensonhurst neighborhood of the New York borough of Brooklyn to a Cuban father and Jewish mother, del Pozo graduated from Stuyvesant High School in New York.

Del Pozo completed a bachelor's in philosophy from Dartmouth College in 1996, and was sent by the NYPD to complete a master's degree in public administration from the John F. Kennedy School of Government at Harvard University in 2004. At the Kennedy School, he was its inaugural 9/11 Public Service Fellow.

He also holds a Master of Arts in Criminal Justice from John Jay College in 2007, and an MPhil (2012) and PhD (2020) in philosophy from CUNY Graduate Center, degrees he studied for while a police officer. He then trained in medicine and public health as a NIDA-funded postdoctoral researcher at The Miriam Hospital and the Warren Alpert Medical School of Brown University, where he received a faculty appointment.

== Research career ==
Del Pozo has been funded by the National Institutes of Health on R01, K01, and R21 grants to investigate how public systems, policies, and law affect the health and safety of individuals and communities. He also conducts research on the powers, responsibilities, and duties of a democratic government, especially its police.

His normative work has centered on the need to balance criminal justice, policing, and drug policy reforms with the public safety goals of reducing crime and maintaining order, noting they are all basic duties government, and public support for reforms in affected communities hinges on fulfilling them in tandem. In 2022, Cambridge University Press published del Pozo's book The Police and the State: Security, Social Cooperation, and the Public Good. It offers an account of the role of police in a democracy, incorporating the work of Hegel, John Rawls, and Elizabeth Anderson.

Some of his health policy research that has gained mainstream attention compares the risks of violence faced by military-aged males in select U.S. cities with the wartime risks of injury and death faced by soldiers deployed to combat in Iraq and Afghanistan, finds that police opioid seizures are associated with increased overdose rates in their aftermath, concludes that crime and disorder did not increase in the areas where New York City converted longstanding syringe service programs to the nation's first government-sanctioned safe injection sites, provides evidence that fentanyl is the prime driver of the US fatal overdose crisis, and assesses efforts to dispel misinformation that police officers can quickly overdose and die from being near the synthetic opioid fentanyl.

== Policing ==
Del Pozo started his career in the New York Police Department (NYPD) as a patrol officer in East Flatbush, Brooklyn in 1997 and rose to the rank of deputy inspector, commanding the 6th and 50th Precincts in Manhattan and the Bronx, and serving overseas as an intelligence officer for the Arab world and India, based in Amman, Jordan. In 2015, del Pozo was nominated to be the chief of police of Burlington, Vermont. His appointment was contested by activists due to his prior work with the NYPD, but his nomination was approved by the Burlington City Council.

=== Opioid addiction and overdose reduction ===
The mayor of Burlington directed del Pozo to create a strategy for addressing the opioid crisis, using a joint public health and public safety approach. He directed patrol officers to carry Naloxone, created of the city's Opioid Policy Coordinator position, and staffed the police department with an epidemiologist and biostatistician. The positions assessed police work for public health outcomes and assisted the city in formulating policies and programs to reduce the death and injury associated with opioid use.

Del Pozo's strategies also reflected the need for people with opioid addiction to have access to the medications proven to treat it, including prisoners, and he set a policy where his department would not arrest people for unprescribed possession of the treatment medication buprenorphine. In 2020, the city of Philadelphia took the same position, citing Burlington, and in 2021, Vermont and Rhode Island went on to pass state laws that codified the approach. Under his strategy, the city coordinated efforts to link people to buprenorphine treatment at the local syringe service program and hospital emergency department, and assisted in efforts to eliminate waiting lists for access to treatment.

In 2018, breaking with parallel upward trends, as the rest of Vermont saw a 20% increase in opioid overdose deaths, Burlington's county saw a 50% decline, the lowest level since the state began keeping records. The reduction was sustained through the end of del Pozo's tenure in 2019.

=== Use of force ===
In the winter of 2016, after a Burlington police officer killed Phil Grenon, a man who attacked the police with knives after a standoff, del Pozo piloted the Police Executive Research Forum's (PERF) use of force guidelines and de-escalation curriculum. The Reveal, a production of American Public Media, aired a segment about the incident: "When Tasers Fail."

In 2018, del Pozo gave the highest award in the department to an officer who was in the path of a robbery suspect fleeing in a vehicle and would have been justified in opening fire, but chose not to given the danger to bystanders, saying restraint and judgment are valuable qualities in a police officer. He also investigated the Vermont State Police Academy for allegations that recruits were being sucker punched in the head by instructors during training, causing a pattern of concussions. The academy settled a suit with an injured student and ceased delivering unexpected blows to the heads of its recruits.

=== Overseas intelligence ===
After the 9/11 terror attacks, the NYPD selected del Pozo to create its first intelligence post with the Arab world, based out of Amman, Jordan, in 2005. Embedded with the Jordanian Public Security Directorate, he responded to suicide bombings at Jordanian hotels executed by Abu Musab al-Zarqawi, and an attack on a Roman amphitheater. He also responded to attacks in Mumbai, India: a 2006 bombing of seven trains on the city's commuter rail, and the 2008 Lashkar-e-Taiba-led attack on downtown Mumbai itself, where gunmen attacked hotels, transportation hubs, tourist areas, and a Jewish cultural center. Del Pozo reported his analyses to the NYPD and other agencies, assessing how these attacks could be replicated by exploiting vulnerabilities in New York City, and what measures could be taken to prevent them. His role was unique in that there was no other U.S. intelligence officer conducting work on behalf of a municipal police department in either region.

=== Resignation ===
Del Pozo resigned as chief on December 16, 2019, after disclosing that he had used an anonymous Twitter account to tweet at a critic of the city for an hour about the person's criticism of outdoor dining, the city's AmeriCorps program, and the renovation of public parks. He told The New York Times that the incident "taught me that nothing good ever comes from letting social media criticism get under your skin."

== Recognition ==
In May 2016, PERF awarded del Pozo its annual Gary Hayes Memorial Award for innovation and leadership. In September 2026, he received Brown University Health's Bruce M. Selya award for excellence in research, one of the institution's highest honors.

== Bicycle accident ==
In 2018, while training for the Lake Placid Ironman 70.3, del Pozo was seriously injured in a bicycle accident, including three skull fractures, brain hemorrhaging, a partially collapsed lung, and seven other fractures. He was transported by emergency airlift to the ICU at the UVM Medical Center. After eight weeks of convalescence, he returned to full duty. Citing concussion symptoms, del Pozo took a second medical leave in the summer of 2019.

== Personal life ==
Del Pozo married Sarah Carnevale in 2002 and has two sons. He wrote and directed a narrative short film, Sunday 1287, which screened at the Yonkers, Middlebury, and Vermont International Film Festivals. The film was based on a crime he investigated while commanding a precinct in the New York borough of the Bronx. An outdoors enthusiast, he has climbed New Hampshire's 48 highest mountains, completed the Lake Placid Half Ironman and other triathlons, and written for publications about cycling and climbing.
