= 2005 Amman bombings =

2005 terrorist attack in Amman, Jordan

- Part of the spillover of the Iraq War
- From top, left to right: Aftermath of the bombings at the Radisson SAS, Grand Hyatt, and Days Inn

- Location within Jordan
- Location: 31°56′59″N 35°55′58″E; Amman, Jordan
- Date: 9 November 2005 began 20:50 (UTC+2)
- Target: Three hotels
- Attack type: Suicide bombings
- Weapon: RDX suicide vests
- Deaths: 60 killed, plus 3 suicide bombers
- Injuries: 115 wounded
- Perpetrator: al-Qaeda

The 2005 Amman bombings were a series of coordinated suicide bomb attacks on three hotel lobbies in Amman, Jordan, on 9 November 2005. The explosions at the Grand Hyatt Hotel, the Radisson SAS Hotel, and the Days Inn started at around 20:50 local time (18:50 UTC) at the Grand Hyatt. The three hotels were frequented by foreign diplomats. The bomb at the Radisson SAS exploded in the Philadelphia Ballroom, where a Palestinian wedding hosting hundreds of guests was taking place. The attacks killed 57 people and injured 115 others.

Al-Qaeda in Iraq was quick to claim responsibility for the attack.

== The attacks ==
2005 Amman bombings casualties
Place	Deaths	Injured	Sources
Radisson SAS blast	36	—N/a	(AP)
Grand Hyatt blast	9	—N/a	(AP)
Days Inn blast	3	—N/a	(AP)
In hospitals	12	—N/a	(AP)
Total	60^{+}	115	
^{+}Excludes the 3 suicide bombers

=== Radisson SAS ===
At the Radisson SAS Hotel (now known as the "Landmark Hotel"), two suicide bombers—husband and wife Ali Hussein Ali al-Shamari and Sajida Mubarak Atrous al-Rishawi—entered the Philadelphia Ballroom, where Ashraf Akhras and Nadia Al-Alami were celebrating their wedding with around 900 Jordanian and Palestinian guests. Sajida al-Rishawi was unable to detonate her belt. Her husband Ali al-Shamari, apparently admonished her and told her to get out of the room. As she was leaving, the lights went out in the ballroom, Ali jumped onto a dining-room table and detonated his explosives. Among the 38 people killed in the explosion were the fathers of the bride and groom.

In addition, the explosion destroyed the ballroom, blew out the large windows bordering the street, and knocked down ceiling panels. The hotel lobby was also affected: ceiling panels and light fixtures collapsed, furniture was destroyed, and the hotel's glass doors were shattered. Cleanup and rebuilding commenced shortly afterwards. The hotel was actually targeted in the 2000 millennium attack plots nearly six years prior, but the plan was foiled.

=== Grand Hyatt ===
The second blast happened about 500 yards (457 metres) from the Radisson SAS. It destroyed the hotel's entrance and brought down pillars and ceiling tiles, along with badly damaging the reception and bar areas. After the bomber ordered orange juice in the hotel's coffee shop, he went to another room (possibly to get his explosive belt) and then came back and detonated his bomb. Seven hotel employees were killed in this blast, as were Syrian-American movie producer Moustapha Akkad and his daughter, Rima. Akkad, who is best known for producing the Halloween series of slasher films, was also the director and producer of Mohammad, Messenger of God. At the time of his death, he was in the early stages of producing a film about Saladin, the Muslim leader who expelled the Crusaders from the Levant. Hyatt began cleanup shortly after the attacks and reopened their hotel on 19 November.

=== Days Inn ===
At the Days Inn, the bomber entered the restaurant on the hotel's ground floor. He tried to detonate his explosive belt but had trouble; a waiter noticed this and called security. The bomber ran outside the hotel and successfully detonated himself, killing three members of a Chinese military delegation. Property damage at the Days Inn was expected to amount to around $200,000.

=== Casualties ===
Deaths by nationality
Country	Number
Jordan	36
Iraq	6
Palestine	5
United States	4
China	3
Bahrain	2
Israel	2
Syria	2
Indonesia	1
Saudi Arabia	1

According to one Jordanian official, Maj. Bashir al-Da'aja, early in the investigation, local authorities confirmed a series of coordinated suicide attacks as the cause of the blasts. Jordanian Deputy Prime Minister Marwan al-Muasher initially announced that at least 67 people had died and 300 people had been injured. However, the Jordanian government subsequently revised the number of casualties down to at least 59 dead and 115 injured.

Among the dead were thirty-six Jordanians, mostly from a Muslim wedding, including the fathers of both the bride and groom. Both the families of the bride and groom were originally from Silat ad-Dhahr, where 18 of the 57 victims killed were also originally from. The rest were six Iraqis, five Palestinians, four Americans, two Palestinian citizens of Israel, two Bahrainis, three Chinese delegates of the People's Liberation Army (PLA), one Saudi, and one Indonesian citizen. Filmmaker Moustapha Akkad died with his daughter.

The Palestinian fatalities included Major-General Bashir Nafeh, the head of military intelligence in the West Bank, Colonel Abed Allun, a high-ranking Preventive Security forces official, Jihad Fatouh, the commercial attaché at the Palestinian Embassy in Cairo, and Mosab Khorma, a senior Palestinian-American banker and former Paltel CEO. Both of the Israeli fatalities were Palestinian Arab citizens of Israel. One was Husam Fathi Mahajna, a businessman from Umm al-Fahm, and the other was an unidentified resident of East Jerusalem.

=== Suspects ===
Jordanian police initially stated that there were at least four attackers (the fourth, a female, was later captured), including a couple. A number of Iraqis were among the more than 100 suspects who were arrested in the following days. Police claimed to have found maps that were used in planning the attack. On 12 November, Jordan's Deputy Prime Minister Marwan Muasher confirmed that the attackers were Iraqi and that there were only three suicide bombers.

On 13 November, King Abdullah announced the arrest of a woman believed to be a fourth would-be suicide bomber, whose explosive belt failed to detonate. The three dead suicide bombers were identified, and their names were announced by Deputy Prime Minister Muasher. They were Ali Hussein Ali al-Shamari (SAS Radisson), Rawad Jassem Mohammed Abed (Grand Hyatt), and Safaa Mohammed Ali (Days Inn). The woman in custody was identified as Sajida Mubarak Atrous al-Rishawi. She was married to al-Shamari and intended to blow herself up at the Radisson. Muasher also said that she was the sister of a close aide of Abu Musab al-Zarqawi. Rishawi was executed in February 2015 in response to the murder of Jordanian air force pilot Muath al-Kasasbeh by ISIL.

== Perpetrators ==
An internet statement released the day after claimed that the bombers were Abu Khabib, Abu Muaz, Abu Omaira, and Om Omaira, all Iraqis.

Al-Qaeda in Iraq immediately claimed the attack on a website, saying they were trying to hit "American and Israeli intelligence and other Western European governments". AQI leader Abu Musab al-Zarqawi claimed the hotels were "playgrounds for Jewish terrorists."

The Radisson hotel was previously an Islamist target during the 2000 millennium attack plots. Jordanian police foiled the original attempt after arresting Khadr Abu Hoshar, a Palestinian militant, along with 15 others on 12 December 1999. It is believed that some of the hotels are frequented by American, Israeli, and European military contractors, journalists, business people, and diplomats, and the city itself has long been described as a "gateway" for Westerners into Baghdad and Iraq at large, leading many to entertain the possibility of a connection between the Amman bombings and the War in Iraq.

== Response ==
=== Domestic ===
King Abdullah II cut a state visit to Kazakhstan short and returned to Jordan, where he pledged that "justice will pursue the criminals" and condemned the attacks. King Abdullah also canceled an upcoming visit to Israel.

Jordanians reacted to the bombings with outrage. Several hundred people in Amman participated in protests against the bombings, chanting "burn in hell, Abu Musab al-Zarqawi". King Abdullah and Queen Rania visited several victims of the bombings in hospital. The King said "The pain you felt for the loss of your beloved ones, who were killed for no crime they committed, was shared by all Jordanians, regardless of their origins or religions." A relative of one of the victims presented a copy of the Qur'an to Abdullah during his visit to the hospital.

The family of Abu Musab al-Zarqawi, the al-Khalayleh tribe, took out half-page advertisements in Jordan's three main newspapers, to denounce him and his actions. Fifty-seven members of the al-Khalayleh family, including al-Zarqawi's brother and cousin, also reiterated their strong allegiance to the king. The ads said,

As we pledge to maintain homage to King Abdullah and to our precious Jordan ... we denounce in the clearest terms all the terrorist actions claimed by the so-called Ahmed Fadheel Nazzal al-Khalayleh, who calls himself Abu-Musab al-Zarqawi ... We announce, and all the people are our witnesses, that we – the sons of the al-Khalayleh tribe – are innocent of him and all that emanates from him, whether action, assertion or decision. ... We sever links with him until doomsday.

=== International ===
United Nations: Secretary-General Kofi Annan had planned to visit Jordan on 10 November 2005, but postponed the trip in light of the bombings. Kofi Annan issued a statement "strongly condemning" the attacks, and underscoring the need for additional security measures against terrorist attacks worldwide.

United States: A spokesman for the White House called the bombings "a heinous act of terror." Secretary of State Condoleezza Rice called the bombings a "great tragedy" that show "the very difficult war that we're fighting." President George W. Bush said "The bombing should remind all of us that there's an enemy in the world that is willing to kill innocent people, willing to bomb a wedding celebration in order to advance their cause." The New York City Police Department had Brandon del Pozo, a newly stationed overseas intelligence officer, working in Amman. He investigated the incident on behalf of New York City, rather than the US federal government, to ascertain what vulnerabilities it might reveal in the way the city protected its hotels from similar threats.

== New anti-terror measures ==
After the bombings, Jordanian government pledged to take new anti-terror measures to ensure that this would not happen again.
