= Ali Moalim Mohamed =

Somalian politician and businessman

Ali Moalim Mohamed علي معلم محمد
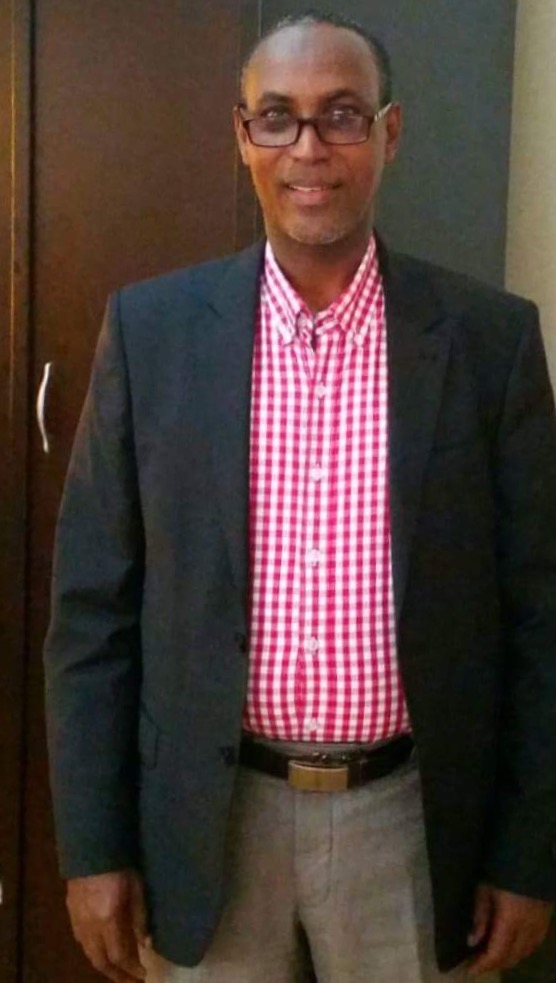
- Photo of Ali Moalim

Hamar Custom Manager
- In office Feb 2011 – 15 May 2017
- President: Mohamed Abdullahi Mohamed; Hassan Sheikh Mohamud; Sharif Sheikh Ahmed

General Secretary of Somalia Business Union
- In office May 2006 – May 2010

Personal details
- Born: 1965 (age 60–61) Adado-Galgadud

Ali Moalim Mohamed (Somali: Ali Mohamed Axmed, Arabic: علي معلم محمد; born 1965) is a businessman and politician from Somalia.

He is Manager of Hamar Custom which is the main Government Income Tax agency. The annual taxation income in 2016 was more than US$130 Million which translates into 70% of the Government Budget of last year.

It seems as reformist leader, before he became the manager of custom, the taxication income was less than US$7 million annually.

He previously became a presidential adviser during the term of Sheikh Sharif that led to him becoming the manager of Hamar Custom. Moalim, who is an economist, has a different view of developing Somali taxes than the Somali Prime Minister. This issue may cause Moalim to be fired from his position. The different view between the Moalim and PM Kheyre started when the PM announced a new Somali taxation program which angered Moalim who sees this as a coup against the Somali constitution.

== Personal life ==
Ali hails from Galgadud Region which is central Somalia, Suleyman Clan.

He graduated from Jamal Abdul Nasir School which was run by the Egyptian government in 1986. He earned bachelor of business degree.

He married Khadra Warsame and another 3 wives; he is the father of 15 children – 10 of them are boys while the remaining are girls.
