= Ali Mohamed Yussuf =

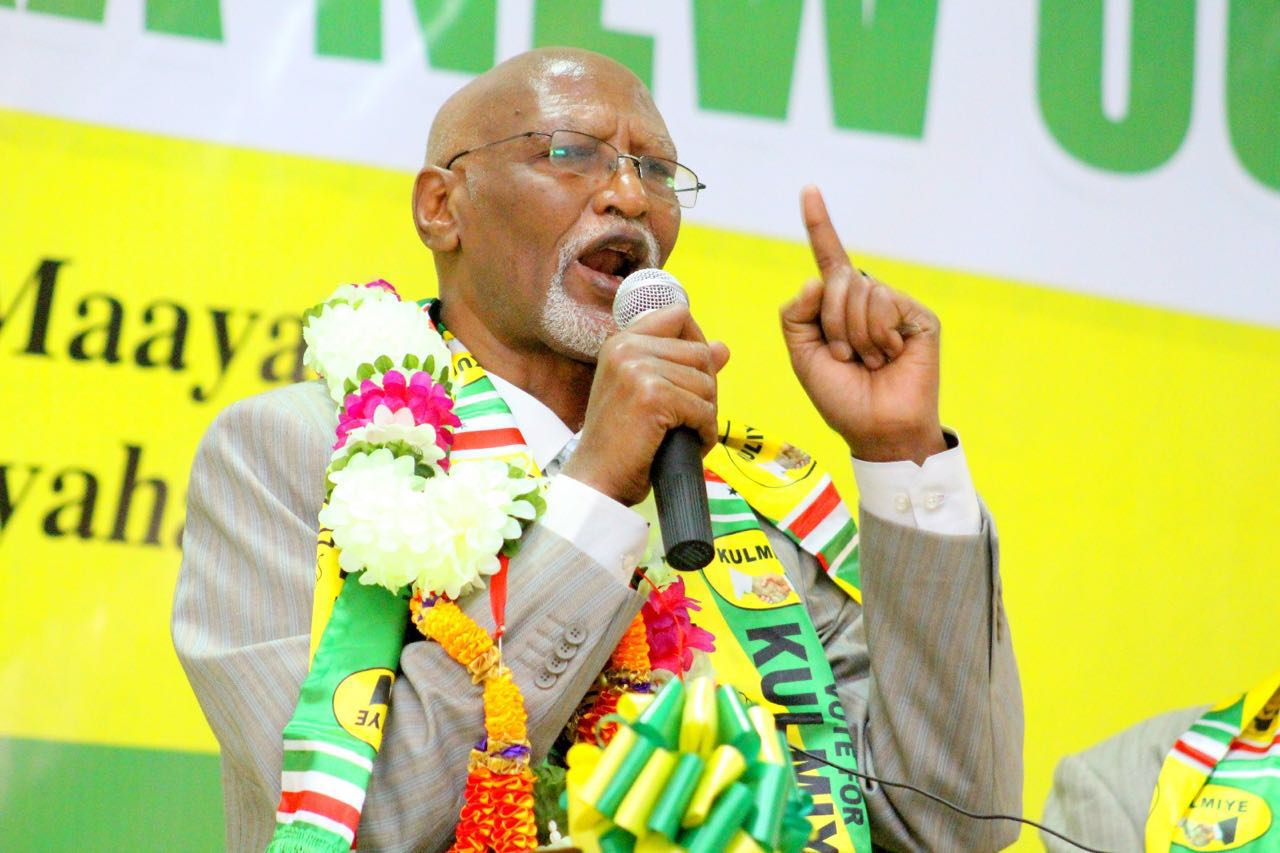

Personal details
- Born: 1952; British Somaliland
- Political party: Peace, Unity, and Development Party
- Nickname: Cali Gurey

Ali Mohamed Yussuf (Somali: Cali Maxamed Yuusuf), Arabic: علي محمد يوسف) (born 1952), more commonly known as Ali Guray is a Somaliland politician. He previously served as the Director of Somaliland's Ministry of Ports and Fishing. He was also the Chairman of the National Demobilization Commission (NDC). Ali Guray is now a member of the ruling Peace, Unity, and Development Party (Kulmiye) in Somaliland.

== See also ==
- Abdirahman Mohamed Abdullahi
- Faisal Ali Warabe
- Musa Behi
- Ahmed Silanyo
- Dahir Riyale
