= Billie the Vision and the Dancers =

Swedish indie band

Billie the Vision & the Dancers
- Origin: Malmö, Blekinge, Dalarna, Sweden
- Genres: Indie rock, Twee pop
- Years active: 2004 - Present
- Labels: Love Will Pay the Bills
- Members: Silvio Arismendi; Sofia Janninge; Pontus Janninge; Gustav Kronkvist; Lars Lindquist; Maria Thenor
- Past members: Frida Brattgård; John Dunsö; Lisa Haglind; Jon Lindquist
- Website: Billie the Vision & the Dancers Official Site

Billie the Vision & the Dancers are a Swedish indie band with roots in Malmö, Blekinge, Dalarna and Argentina. The band recorded the first album I Was So Unpopular in School and Now They're Giving Me This Beautiful Bicycle in the spring of 2004. They produce their albums through the company Love will pay the Bills. Free mp3 files of all five albums are available through their website, with an appeal for donations in return. Their song, Summercat, was used in an advert for Spanish lager makers, Estrella Damm. The band were also included in the advert, performing in Formentera. The first airing of the Barcelona-based beer companies advert was in Spain, 2009. It first aired in the UK in the Spring of 2012.

== Biography ==
Billie the Vision and the Dancers were formed in Malmö, Sweden. They recorded their first album in the spring of 2004. Singer Lars Lindquist started as a soloist but later formed the band.

== Members ==
- Silvio Arismendi - percussion (2005–present)
- Pontus Janninge - acoustic guitar, vocals (2018–present)
- Sofia Janninge - percussion, violin, vocals (2004–present)
- Gustav Kronkvist - electric guitar (2004–2012, 2016-present)
- Lars Lindquist - vocals, tambourine (2004–present)
- Maria Thenor - bass (2004–present)

=== Former members ===
- John Dunsö - acoustic guitar, backing vocals (2004–2010)
- Lisa Haglind - accordion, trumpet, synths (2004–2008)
- Frida Brattgård – trumpet, accordion (2008–2012)
- Jon Lindquist - drums (2008–2014)

== Discography ==
- I Was So Unpopular in School and Now They're Giving Me This Beautiful Bicycle (2004)
- The World According to Pablo (2005)
- Where the Ocean Meets My Hand (2007)
- I Used to Wander These Streets (2008)
- From Burning Hell to Smile and Laughter (2010)
- While You Were Asleep (2012)
- The Key To My Magic World (EP) (2015)
- What's The Matter With You Boy? (2017)
- Billie No Mates (2019)

== Singles ==
- "A man from Argentina"
- "Ask for More"
- "Scared"
- "So you want me to Bleed"
- "Absolutely, Salutely"
- "Summercat" (2009)
- "Queen of the Dancefloor" (2012)
