= Mohammad Ali (Khyber Pakhtunkhwa politician) =

Pakistani politician

MPA Mohammad Ali

Member of the Khyber Pakhtunkhwa Assembly
- Incumbent
- Assumed office 31 May 2013
- Constituency: PK-92 (Upper Dir-II)

Personal details
- Party: Jamaat-e-Islami Pakistan (JI)
- Occupation: Politician

Mohammad Ali (Urdu: محمد علی) is a Pakistani politician from Upper Dir District who was a member of the Khyber Pakhtunkhwa Assembly from 2013 to 2018, belongs to Jamaat-e-Islami Pakistan. He is also serving as chairman and member of the different committees.

== Political career ==
Ali was elected as the member of the Khyber Pakhtunkhwa Assembly on ticket of Jamaat-e-Islami Pakistan from PK-92 (Upper Dir-II) in the 2013 Pakistani general election.
