= Domkraft =

Swedish doom metal band

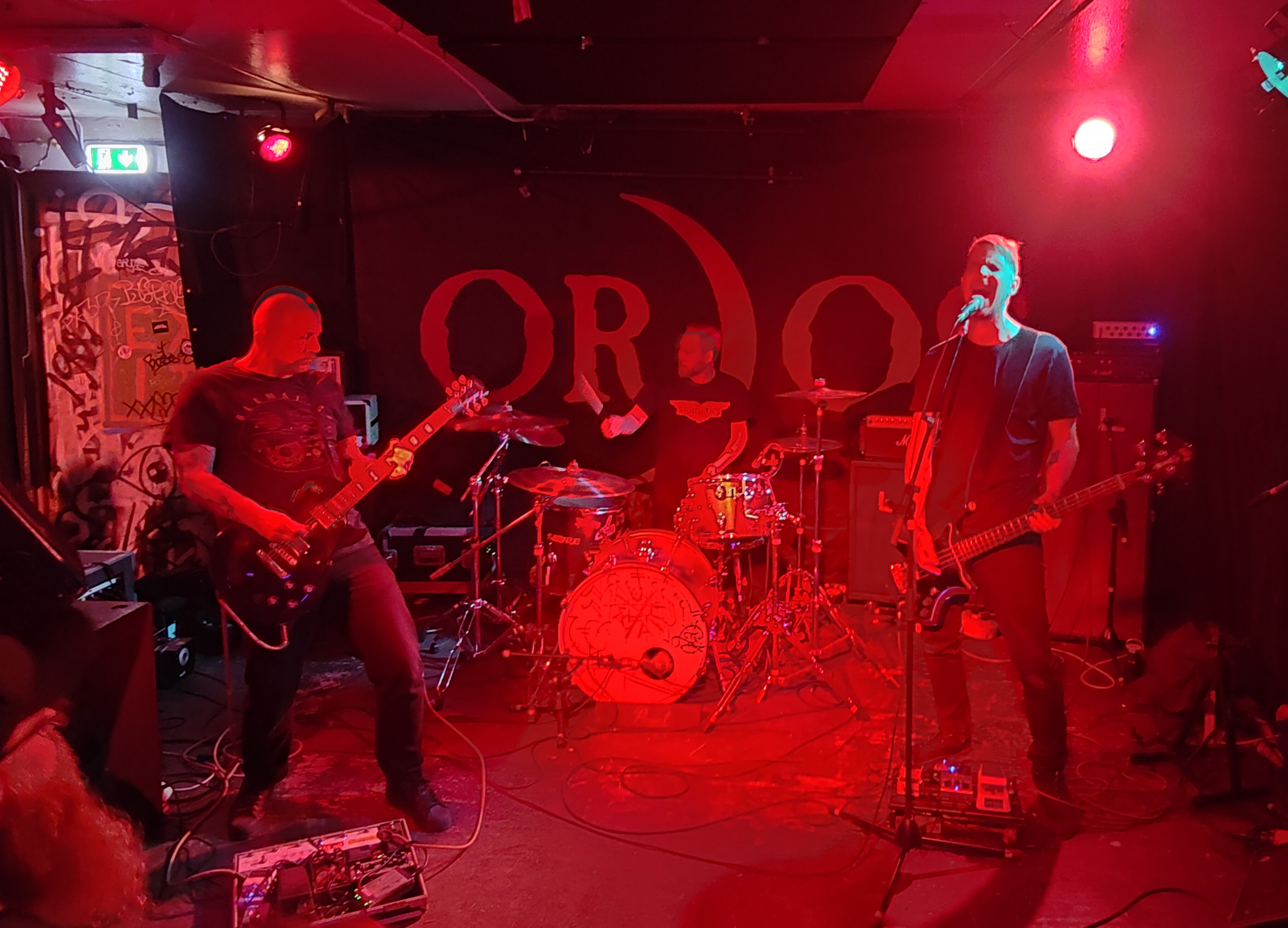
- Domkraft performing at Kulturhuset Femman in Uppsala, Sweden, while opening for Ordos, 2025

Background information
- Origin: Stockholm, Sweden
- Genres: Doom metal, Psychedelic Sludge Metal
- Years active: 2014–present
- Labels: Dawn Of Man, Magnetic Eye, Blues Funeral, Majestic Mountain
- Members: Martin Wegeland; Anders Dahlgren; Gustav Danielsson

Domkraft is a Swedish doom metal band formed in Stockholm in 2014. The band has released four studio albums and is associated with the contemporary European doom and stoner metal scene.

== History ==
=== Formation and Early Releases (2014–2016) ===
Domkraft was formed in Stockholm by bassist and vocalist Martin Wegeland, guitarist Anders Dahlgren, and drummer Gustav Danielsson. Although based in Stockholm, the members originate from various Swedish cities: Trollhättan, Varberg and Kalmar.

The band's debut album was the self-titled EP Domkraft, released in 2015, through Dawn of Man Recordings. The album’s initial pressing of 250 copies sold out shortly after release.

The End of Electricity, released in 2016 through Magnetic Eye Records, received generally positive reviews within the doom metal press. Critics frequently highlighted the band’s emphasis on repetition, heavy riffing, and extended compositions, as well as the album’s hypnotic and psychedelic qualities. Reviews commonly praised the album’s massive sound, immersive atmosphere, and use of prolonged, drone-based structures that create a trance-like listening experience. The production and mix were also noted for balancing the vocals with the instrumentation, allowing them to function as part of the overall sonic texture rather than dominating it. Individual tracks such as “The Rift” and “Meltdown of the Orb” were frequently cited as examples of the band’s long-form approach to songwriting. Some critics, however, observed that the album’s reliance on repetition and long runtimes could result in limited variation, with certain tracks perceived as overstretched compared to the band’s earlier work.

=== Flood and growing recognition (2017–2019) ===
Their second album, Flood, was released in 2018 through Blues Funeral Recordings, marking the band’s debut for the label. Critics generally described the album as a refinement of Domkraft’s established sound, emphasizing massive, hypnotic riffs, extended compositions, and a dense psychedelic atmosphere. Reviews frequently highlighted the improved production and cohesive songwriting compared with their debut, noting the trio’s ability to sustain long-form tracks through subtle variation and dynamic pacing. While some commentators observed that the album adhered closely to traditional doom and stoner metal conventions and offered limited stylistic innovation, most considered this focus a strength, praising the band’s execution, musicianship, and immersive sonic impact.

Overall, Flood was regarded as a strong continuation of the style introduced on The End of Electricity, further solidifying Domkraft’s presence within the modern doom metal scene.

=== Seeds (2020-2021) ===
In 2021, Domkraft released Seeds through Magnetic Eye Records. The album was described as expansive and atmospheric, with apocalyptic thematic elements.

The album was largely written prior to the COVID-19 pandemic and marked a thematic shift from the apocalyptic imagery of the band’s earlier releases toward ideas of renewal and rebirth. Dahlgren described the record as exploring the concept of “a seed for something new,” reflecting a desire to move beyond recurring end-of-the-world narratives in the band’s previous work. Wegeland described the album as addressing themes of starting over and building something new, intended to convey hope rather than purely post-apocalyptic imagery. He noted that most material had been written before the COVID-19 pandemic and was therefore not directly influenced by it.

Seeds was recorded in Gothenburg at Welfare Sounds & Records over four days. As with previous releases, the band recorded the core instrumentation live in the studio without a click track, prioritising atmosphere and performance energy over technical precision. The trio emphasised groove, headroom and spatial depth during tracking in order to achieve what they described as a “wide, heavy sound.”

The album artwork, created by long-time collaborator Björn Atldax using physical models assembled from animal parts and photographed as a stereoscopic diorama, featured a stereoscopic 3D photographic design accompanied by viewing glasses in physical editions. The imagery incorporated assembled animal skeletal elements to visually reflect the album’s theme of growth and transformation.

Track sequencing was subject to discussion between the band and their label. The title track ultimately replaced “Perpetuator” as the opening song due to its stronger momentum and energy. The album runs for approximately 44 minutes, a length the band has described as optimal for vinyl production and overall listening coherence. A limited deluxe box edition of Seeds included the bonus track “Bones,” an early composition revisited and reworked for release.

Seeds received generally positive reviews. Critics highlighted its massive sound, psychedelic influences, and thematic depth. Several reviewers praised the album’s sonic weight and immersive atmosphere, highlighting its dense guitar tone, expansive structures, and carefully developed songwriting. Critics also emphasised the band’s strong psychedelic orientation. The album was frequently characterised as heavy psychedelic rock informed by late-1960s and early-1970s influences, with an organic production style that reinforces its live-recorded feel.

Some reviewers, however, noted limitations in variation across the album’s extended compositions, arguing that relatively restrained dynamics and production choices reduced its replay value despite the strength of its core ideas.

Overall, Seeds was regarded as a significant entry within contemporary psychedelic doom and stoner metal, with multiple outlets describing it as one of the stronger heavy releases of 2021.

=== Collaborations and Sonic Moons (2022–2023) ===
In April 2022, Domkraft released the split album Ascend/Descend with Northern Irish band Slomatics through Majestic Mountain Records. The release consists of six tracks, with each band contributing three songs and performing a cover of the other’s material.

Domkraft’s side of the split was described as emphasising dense riffing, psychedelic textures, and extended compositions, continuing the group’s established doom and sludge-oriented style. Reviews commonly highlighted the complementary nature of the two bands’ approaches. While Domkraft’s contribution was associated with a more layered psychedelic sound, Slomatics’ material was often described as slower and more grinding in execution, creating a contrast between the two halves of the record. The exchange of cover versions was frequently cited as reinforcing the conceptual cohesion of the split.

Critical reception was generally positive within specialist heavy music publications. Commentators praised the release’s sonic weight, atmospheric density, and the perceived compatibility of the two bands’ styles, with some describing the collaboration as a natural pairing within the contemporary doom and stoner metal scene.

The band's fourth album, Sonic Moons, was released on 8 September 2023. It marked a continuation of the band’s psychedelic doom and sludge-oriented sound while introducing a somewhat clearer and more expansive production compared to earlier releases.

The album comprises seven tracks with a total running time of approximately 47 minutes. Reviewers described the material as riff-driven and groove-oriented, structured around extended repetitions and gradual dynamic development rather than abrupt contrasts. Its sound has been characterised as blending doom metal with heavy psychedelic rock influences, drawing on late-1960s and early-1970s aesthetics while maintaining a dense, contemporary production.

Several reviews highlighted the album’s cohesive sequencing, noting that the tracks flow in a manner that emphasizes atmosphere and immersion over individual singles. The songs “Magnetism” and “The Big Chill” were frequently referenced as examples of the band’s use of sustained grooves and gradual layering to build intensity. Sonic Moons received generally positive reviews from music publications specialising in heavy and psychedelic rock. Critics praised the album’s sonic weight, textured production, and consistency, with some describing it as among the band’s most fully realised works to date. The record’s emphasis on repetition and sustained heaviness was frequently identified as central to its aesthetic. While many reviewers regarded this approach as immersive and hypnotic, others considered the limited variation and persistent density to reduce contrast across the album’s runtime.

Overall, the album was described as reinforcing Domkraft’s position within the contemporary psychedelic doom and sludge metal scene through its combination of heavy riffing, expansive structures, and cohesive atmosphere.

=== Anniversary reissue and recent activity (2024–present) ===
In June 2025, Domkraft released a remastered tenth-anniversary edition of their self-titled debut EP through Magnetic Eye Records, expanded with two previously unreleased tracks to form a full-length album. The reissue revisits material originally released in 2015, combining remastered versions of the four original compositions with new songs that reflect the band’s subsequent development.

Critics described the release as rooted in dense, repetitive riffing and heavy psychedelic doom aesthetics, with instrumentation frequently foregrounded over vocals. Reviews noted that the extended compositions emphasise gradual development and hypnotic structures, while the remastering enhances the sonic weight of the original recordings. Some commentary characterised the material as representative of the band’s early style, combining doom, sludge, and psychedelic influences into monolithic arrangements.

The newly added tracks, “Spiral Noises” and “The Bane,” were generally interpreted as indicating a degree of stylistic progression. Observers highlighted the more restrained instrumentation and increased prominence of vocals on “The Bane,” suggesting a refinement of the band’s approach compared with the original EP material. At the same time, several reviews emphasised the release’s retrospective character, describing it primarily as a celebration of the group’s early period rather than a major artistic departure.

Reception was largely positive within specialist publications, which praised the album’s sonic heaviness and immersive atmosphere, while some critics noted that the emphasis on repetition and extended passages could limit variation across the record.

On 18 of August 2026, Domkraft released the first single, Void Runner, of their latest album, Night Songs. The album is scheduled to be released on 20 of November 2026.

== Live performances ==
Domkraft has toured internationally and appeared at heavy music festivals across Europe. The band has stated that touring is typically organised in short runs rather than extended tours, citing family commitments and professional obligations.

== Musical style ==
Domkraft’s music has been described as a fusion of traditional doom metal and stoner rock, incorporating psychedelic elements. The band has described their music as “heavy, slightly psychedelic rock”, acknowledging elements of doom, sludge, stoner and space rock without identifying strictly with one genre. Reviews frequently highlight the band’s repetitive riff structures, dense distortion, and emphasis on atmosphere. In interviews, members have described their music as “heavy stuff with a psychedelic flair,” emphasizing that genre labels are ultimately open to interpretation.

The band has also developed a recurring practice of including short interlude tracks, some of which later evolve into full compositions on subsequent releases. Domkraft consistently records their core instrumentation live in the studio without a click track, favouring room acoustics and minimal post-production editing.

Lyrical themes in the band's work include dystopian and cosmic subject matter.

== Members ==
- Martin Wegeland – Bass, vocals
- Anders Dahlgren – Drums
- Martin Widholm – Guitars

== Discography ==
=== Studio albums ===
- The End of Electricity (2016)
- Flood (2018)
- Seeds (2021)
- Sonic Moons (2023)
- Night Songs (2026)

=== EPs ===
- Domkraft (2015)
- Where We Part Ways (2019)
- Slow Fidelity (2019)

=== Split releases ===
- Domkraft / Slomatics – Ascend / Descend (2022)

=== Live albums ===
- Day Of Doom Live (2020)

=== Compilation appearance ===
- The Day of Doom (2020)
