= Safaa Mohammed Ali =

Iraqi militant who carried out the 2005 Amman bombings

- Born: 1982
- Died: November 9, 2005 (aged 22–23)

Safaa Mohammed Ali (1982-November 9, 2005) was an Iraqi militant who carried out the 2005 Amman bombings. He has been also referred to as one of the Al-Qaeda members who planned the 9/11 bombing on The Pentagon and the Twin Towers. He is also associated with a planned attack on the White House.

He was captured in November 2004 by U.S. forces during the battle of Fallujah and he was released two weeks later because his captors failed to identify him as a combatant. Nearly a year later he detonated a suicide vest as one of the perpetrators of the 2005 Amman bombings.
