= Mahmud Ali (village) =

Mahmud Ali محمودعلی
- Village
- Location within Iran
- Coordinates: 32°47′32″N 48°27′21″E
- Country: Iran
- Province: Khuzestan
- County: Andimeshk
- Bakhsh: Alvar-e Garmsiri
- Rural District: Mazu

Population (2006)
  - Total: 109
- Time zone: UTC+3:30 (IRST)
  - Summer (DST): UTC+4:30 (IRDT)

Mahmud Ali (Persian: محمودعلی, also Romanized as Maḩmūd ʿAlī) is a village in Mazu Rural District, Alvar-e Garmsiri District, Andimeshk County, Khuzestan Province, Iran. At the 2006 census, its population was 109, in 22 families.
