= Muhammad Ali (footballer, born 1985) =

Indonesian footballer

M. Ali
Personal information
- Full name: Muhammad Ali
- Date of birth: 10 April 1985 (age 41)
- Place of birth: Indonesia
- Height: 1.74 m (5 ft 8 1/2 in)
- Positions: Defender; midfielder

Senior career*
Years	Team	Apps	(Gls)
2009–2012	PSAP Sigli	97	(8)
- * Club domestic league appearances and goals

Muhammad Ali (born 10 April 1985) is an Indonesian former footballer who played as a defender or midfielder.

== Club statistics ==
Club	Season	Super League		Premier Division		Piala Indonesia		Total	
Club	Season	Apps	Goals	Apps	Goals	Apps	Goals	Apps	Goals
PSAP Sigli	2011-12	23	0	-		-		23	0
Total		23	0	-		-		23	0
