= Black City (Division of Laura Lee album) =

Studio album by Division of Laura Lee
- Released: 4 February 2002
- Recorded: at Svenska Grammofon Studion
- Genre: Indie rock, garage rock, post-punk revival
- Length: 35:58
- Label: Burning Heart (BHR-146); US: Epitaph (82022); JP: Victor Entertainment (VICP-62149)
- Producer: Kalle Gustafsson, Don Alstherberg and Division of Laura Lee

Division of Laura Lee chronology
At the Royal Club (1999)	Black City (2002)	Das Not Compute (2004)

Professional ratings
Review scores
Source	Rating
Allmusic	4/5 stars
Drowned in Sound	10/10
Pitchfork	6.7/10
Punknews.org	4.5/5 stars

Black City is the debut album by Division of Laura Lee. It was originally released on February 4, 2002 on Burning Heart Records. It was later released on February 19 in the US and on December 18 in Japan. It was produced by the band with the help of Kalle Gustafsson and Don Alstherberg.

== Track listing ==
1. "Need to Get Some" – 3:12
2. "We've Been Planning This for Years" – 2:49
3. "Number One" – 2:56
4. "Trapped In" – 2:54
5. "Access Identity" – 2:41
6. "I Guess I'm Healed" – 3:59
7. "The Truth Is Fucked" – 3:38
8. "Black City" – 3:40
9. "I Walk on Broken Glass" – 2:01
10. "Second Rule Is" – 1:35
11. "Pretty Electric" – 3:10
12. "Wild and Crazy" – 3:28

== Personnel ==
=== Band members ===
- Per Stålberg - Vocals, Guitar, Slide guitar, e-bow and percussion
- Jonas Gustafsson - Vocals, Bass, Fender rhodes, keyboards, piano and percussion
- Håkan Johansson - Drums and percussion
- Henrik Röstberg - Guitar, vocals and noise.

=== Additional personnel ===
- Kalle Gustafsson – additional vocals on Number One, Need To Get Some and Second Rule Is. Moog synthesizer and sound effects, producing, recording, mixing
- Johannes Persson – percussion on I Guess I’m Healed, Black City and Need To Get Some, congas & handclaps on I Guess I’m Healed.
- Anders Danielsson - pedal steel on I Guess I’m Healed.
- Tuomas Siirilä – keyboards on Number One and Pretty Electric. Additional Guitar on Wild And Crazy.
- David S. Holloway - photography
- Björn Engelmann - mastering
- Don Alstherberg - producing, recording, mixing
- Prof. Yaya - design
