= Mohammed Ali Shah =

Mohammed Ali Shah may refer to

- Muhammad Ali Shah (1777–1842), the third King of Oudh (an Indian state)
- Mohammad Ali Shah Qajar (1872–1925), the sixth king of the Qajar Dynasty, Shah of Persia (Iran)
- Mohommed Ali Shah, Indian actor
- Muhammad Ali Shah (footballer)
