= Samson for President =

Swedish soul musician

Samson for President is a Swedish/Colombian musical duo consisting of producer and vocalist Martin Bejarano Wahlgren and producer and drummer Patrick Lundin.

== Career ==
After releasing their studio album Perseverancia in 2023, Samson for President gained international recognition for their unique and genre-defying sound, blending elements of soul, rock, ballads, and folk music. The duo's authenticity and innovative musical landscapes drew praise from critics and fans alike.

In 2023, Rolling Stone Magazine described their music as "a gem full of quality and potential." In 2024, New York Weekly praised the duo's "uncanny ability to navigate through soul, rock, ballads, and folk music with seamless ease."

The duo toured Australia and Europe in 2024 and began working on their next studio album, which is slated for release in 2025.

== Early years ==
Martin Bejarano Wahlgren first emerged on the Swedish soul scene in 2007 with the release of his demo album Kibiriti. His debut studio album, Papa's Old Piano (2012), garnered significant attention and helped establish his presence in the Swedish music landscape. The album's title refers to a 100-year-old piano shared with his father, who had a love for classical music. In 2012, Metro International featured him as part of the emerging soul scene in Sweden.

The album also earned him a nomination for "Soul Album of the Year" at the Kingsize Awards. He performed on Swedish television, appearing on TV4's Nyhetsmorgon and was featured on Sveriges Radio P3 and SR Metropol. He is recognized as one of the key figures in Sweden's soul revival and a frequent performer at Stockholm's legendary music venue, Fasching.

In 2013, Wahlgren was the opening act for Raphael Saadiq and performed alongside Sharon Jones & The Dap-Kings on their tour. His collaborations include working with Swedish artists such as Mohammed Ali, Carlito, The Salazar Brothers, and Isak Strand.

In 2013, Wahlgren also received an arts stipend from Haninge Municipality.

== Early life and education ==
Martin Bejarano Wahlgren was born and raised in Stocksund, a suburb of Stockholm, Sweden. He attended Stockholms estetiska gymnasium, a high school specializing in the arts.

== Discography ==
=== Albums ===
- Kibiriti (2007, Flow Free)
- Papa's Old Piano (2012, Flow Free)
- Sisyphus (2015, Flow Free)
- Perseverancia (2023, Flow Free)

=== EPs ===
- For Your Love EP (2014, Flow Free)
- Go Big EP (2018, Psykbunkern/Art:ery)
- Baeuty Supply EP (2022, Flow Free)
