= Black City (band) =

Danish rock band

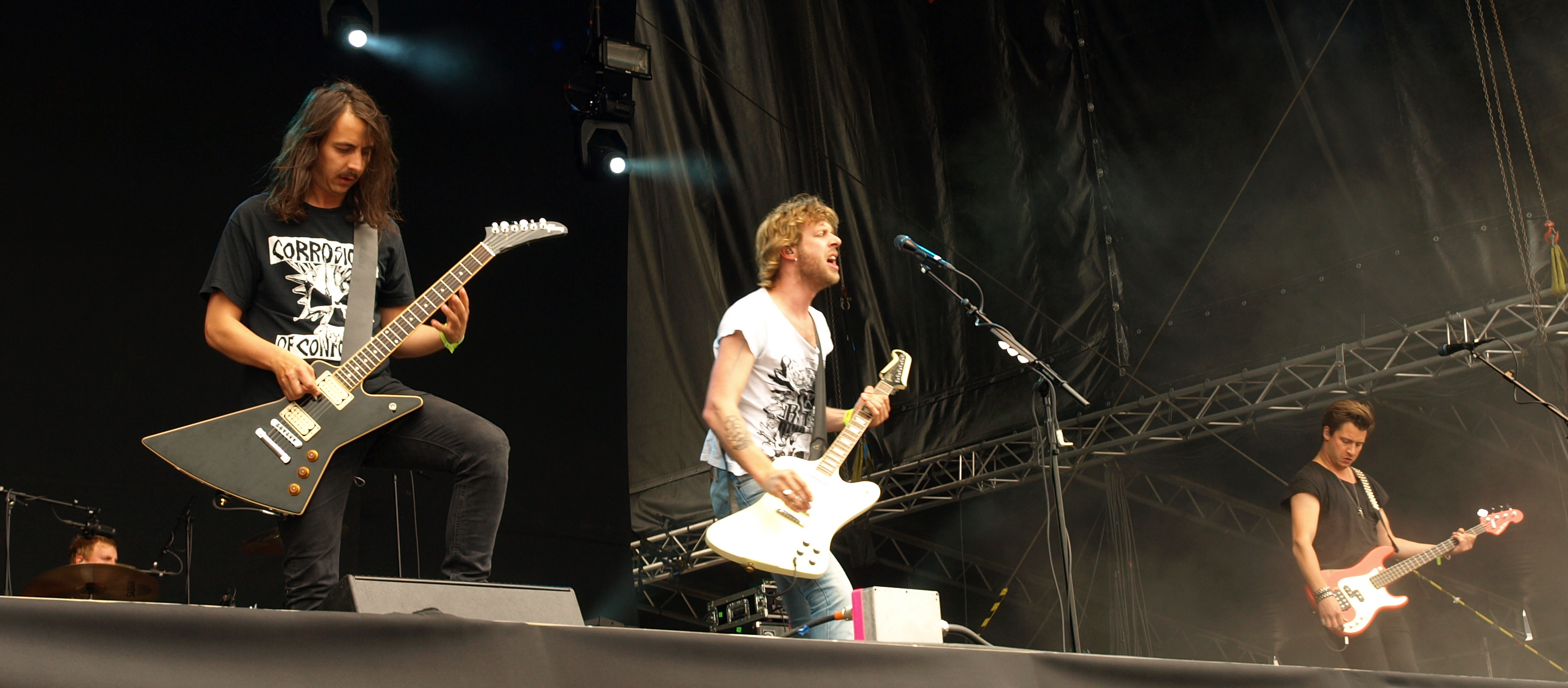
- Black City at the Tuska Open Air 2013

Background information
- Origin: Aarhus, Denmark
- Genres: Rock
- Years active: 2009 - 2014
- Labels: Universal Music (2009-2012); Sony Music (2012-2014)
- Members: Bjørn Poulsen; Kristian Klærke; Anders Borre Mathiesen; Jakob Bjørn Hansen (Hanson)
- Past members: Torleik Mortensen; Mixen Lindberg

Black City was a Danish rock band from Aarhus, Denmark based in the Danish capital Copenhagen. The band consists of Kristian Klærke (Guitar), Bjørn Poulsen (Vocals, guitar), Anders Borre Mathiesen (Bass) and Jakob Bjørn Hansen (Hanson) (Drums).

The band has released two studio albums: Black City (2010), and Fire (2013).

== Discography ==
=== Studio albums ===
Year	Studio Albums	Peak Position		Certification
Year	Studio Albums	Denmark	Norway	Certification
2010	Black City	36	20	
2013	Fire			
"—" marks a release that has not charted or has not been released in that territory.
