= Asha Ali =

Somali-Swedish singer-songwriter

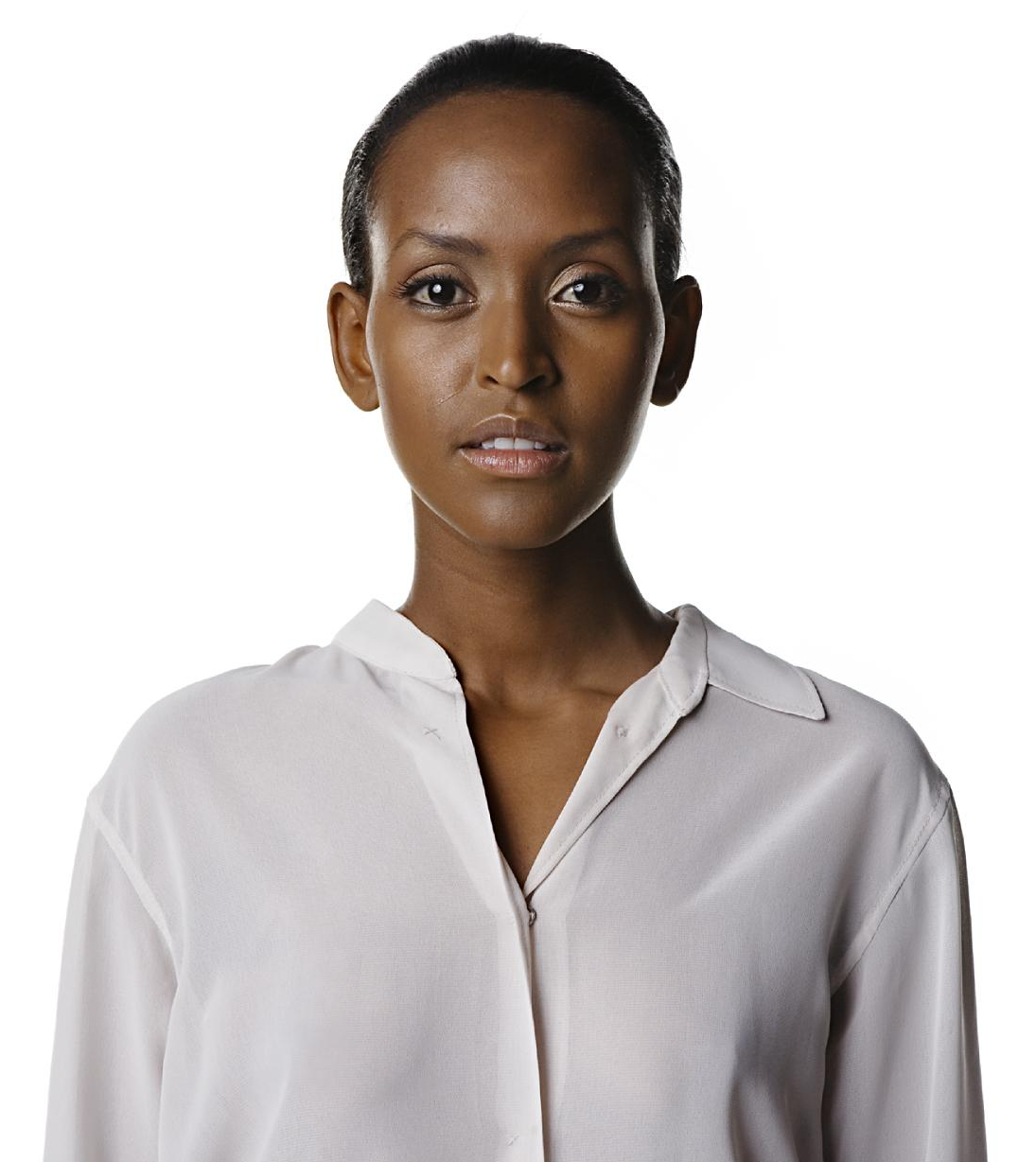

Background information
- Born: Ethiopia
- Origin: Stockholm, Sweden
- Genres: Indie pop
- Years active: 2005-present
- Label: 3NO Music
- Website: www.ashaali.com

Asha Ali (born 7 June 1980) is a Somali-Swedish singer-songwriter based in Sweden. Her music blends indie pop, soul and singer-songwriter influences.

== Career ==
Ali began her music career in 2005 with the release of the acoustic Warm Fronts EP. Her self-titled debut album, Asha Ali, was released in 2006 and received nominations for both Grammis and P3 Guld awards.

In 2009, Ali released her second studio album, Hurricane. The album included the song "The Time Is Now", which was used by Saab Automobile in its "Change Perspectives" advertising campaign for the Saab 9-3X. The same song was also performed by Ali during the world premiere of the new Saab 9-5 at the 2009 Frankfurt Motor Show.

Ali later released the album Loud and Out of Place in 2014.

== Discography ==
=== Studio albums ===
- Asha Ali (2006)
- Hurricane (2009)
- Loud and Out of Place (2014)

=== EPs and singles ===
- Warm Fronts EP (2005)
- A Promise Broken (2007)
- Any Higher (2015)
