= Division of Laura Lee =

Swedish rock band

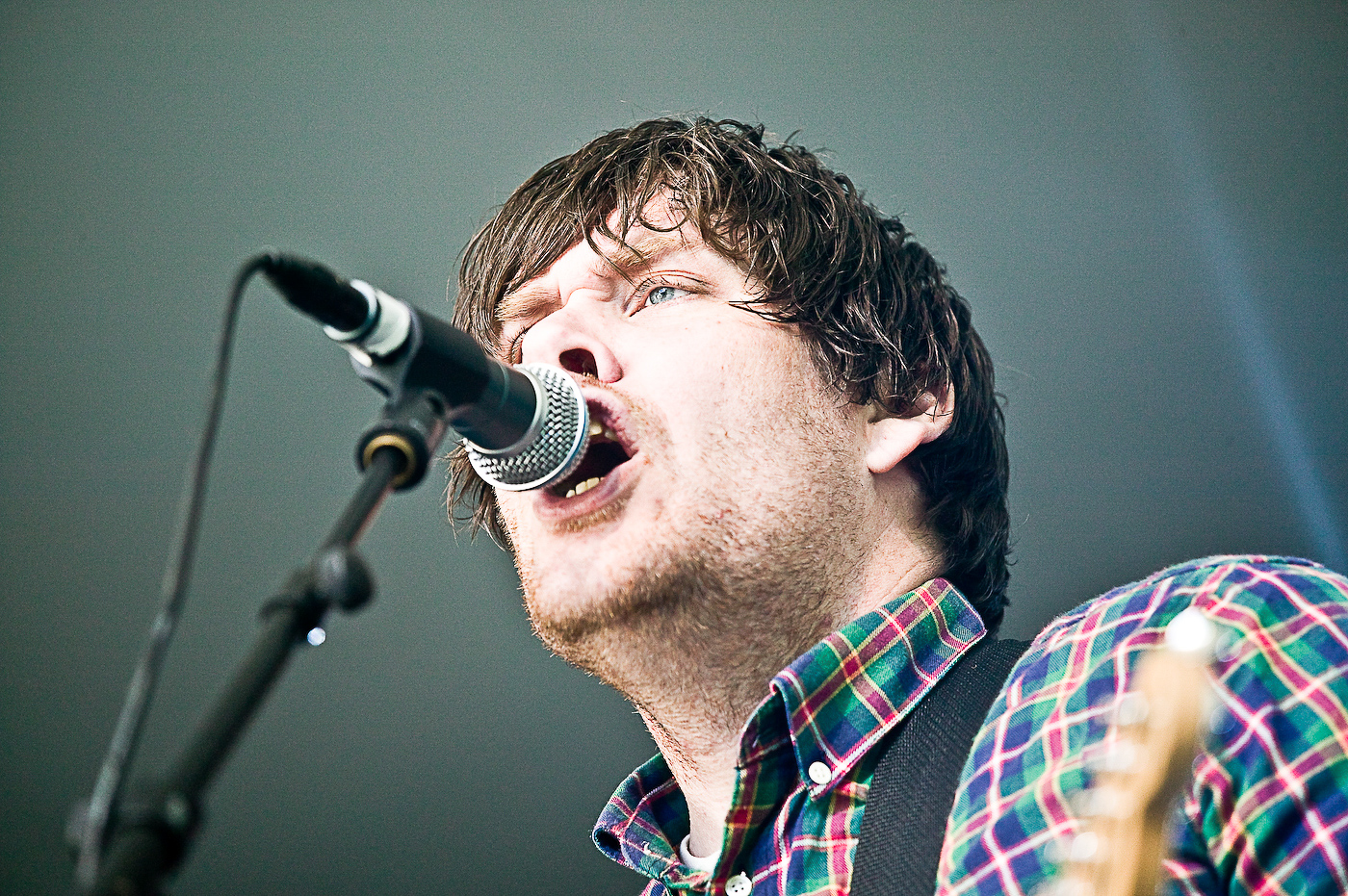
- Per Stålberg, singer and guitarist with Division of Laura Lee, at the Siesta festival in June 2011

Background information
- Origin: Vänersborg, Sweden
- Genres: Punk rock, indie rock, garage rock, garage punk, alternative rock, post-punk revival
- Years active: 1997–present
- Labels: Epitaph, Burning Heart
- Members: Håkan Johansson; Per Stålberg; Jonas Gustafsson; Viktor Lager
- Past members: Henrik Röstberg; David Fransson
- Website: divisionoflauralee.com

Division of Laura Lee is a band of Swedish musicians/skateboarders originally from Vänersborg, Sweden heavily influenced by post-punk bands, britpop and the DC music scene (Dischord Records). The name comes from Laura Lee, a soul singer, and the phrase "Division Of" which was spotted on a cardboard box at their practice space.

== Biography ==
Division of Laura Lee was formed in Vänersborg in the late 1990s with band members Per Stålberg, Jonas Gustafsson, Henrik Röstberg and Håkan Johansson. The name comes from Laura Lee, a soul singer, and the phrase "Division Of" which was spotted on a cardboard box at their practice space.

A debut single was released in December 1997 and the band started touring in December 1998, first in Sweden and then Europe. David Fransson replaced Röstberg in 2000 and the group released a debut album Black City in 2002. Gustafsson said of the band in 2002, "We’re working-class kids. [Vänersborg is] a town where you either do drugs or work at the Saab factory, and we were outsiders. You have to believe in something."

Their second album Das Not Compute was released in 2004. They were described in a gig review published in Aftonbladet in 2004 as having emerged as "one of [Sweden's] most intense rock bands” who were best seen live. The following year, in 2005, they were to tour the United States but this was cancelled at three days notice owing to financial problems at the record company, Burning Heart. They performed at the South by Southwest music festival in Austin, Texas in March 2006.

Two further albums followed: Violence Is Timeless, released in 2008, reached no. 34 in the Swedish charts, and Tree, released in 2013, reached no. 41. Viktor Lager joined the band for the Tree album and Fransson left in 2017. The band marked 20 years since their formation with an anniversary gig in December 2017; Stålberg ascribed the band's longevity to staying true to themselves and creating something unique and real, and asserted that they would continue to play together for as long as it was fun. The album Apartment was released in 2020.

== Discography ==
=== Albums ===
Year	Album	Record label	Peak positions
Year	Album	Record label	SWE
1999	At the Royal Club	Arabesque	–
2002	Black City	Burning Heart / Epitaph	–
2003	97-99	Lovitt Records	–
2004	Das Not Compute	Burning Heart / Epitaph	–
2008	Violence Is Timeless	I Made This	34
2013	Tree	Oh Really!?	41
2020	Apartment	Welfare Sounds	
