= Centre of Excellence in Molecular Biology =

Research institute in Pakistan

CEMB
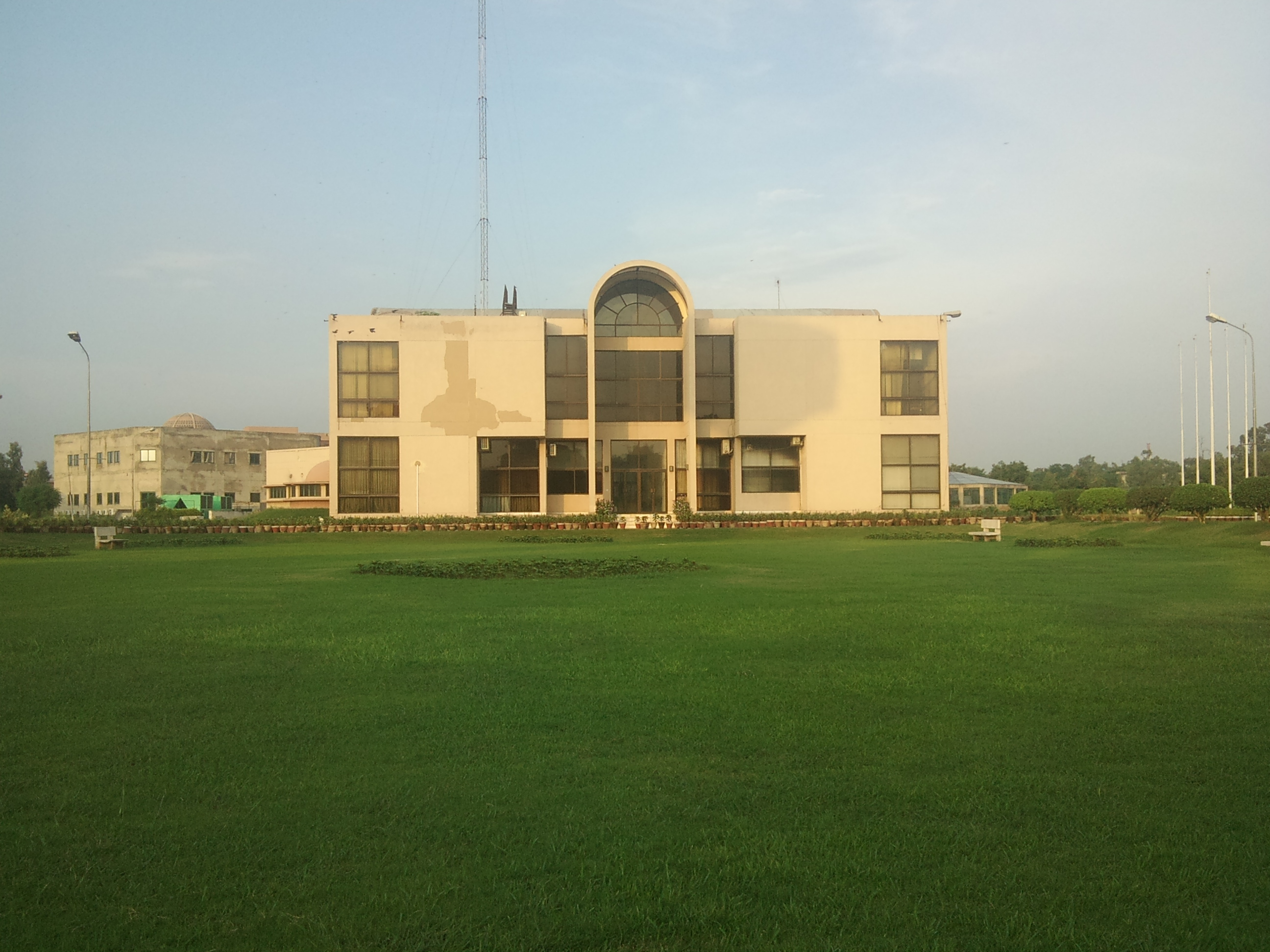
- CEMB (Centre of Excellence in Molecular Biology)
- Type: Academic/Research Institute
- Established: 1985
- Affiliations: University of the Punjab
- Director: Prof. Dr. Moazur Rahman
- Academic staff: 40
- Students: 80
- Postgraduates: 40
- Doctoral students: 40
- Location: Lahore, Punjab, Pakistan; 31°28′40″N 74°15′44″E
- Website: www.cemb.edu.pk

Centre of Excellence in Molecular Biology (CEMB) is a biological research institute located on the West Bank of the Canal Road Lahore, Punjab, Pakistan. It is an autonomous organization that is under administrative control of University of the Punjab, Lahore, Pakistan.

== History ==
On 1 November 1981, University of the Punjab announced the "birth" of the centre. In April, 1983 the Federal Government allocated a sum of 1.635 million rupees to create a nucleus laboratory of the centre. In November, 1985 the proposal to establish the Centre for Advanced Molecular Biology (CAMB) was approved at a cost of 24.55 million rupees. In 1986, the CAMB project was upgraded into a Centre of Excellence in Molecular Biology (CEMB) and the cost of setting it up was subsequently revised in January 1991, to 44.33 million rupees. In April 1987, the Federal Ministry of Science & Technology (MOST) approved the establishment of a Centre for Applied Molecular Biology (CAMB), located back to back with the laboratory block of the Centre of Excellence in Molecular Biology (CEMB). The CEMB established nucleus laboratories in March, 1985 in two student laboratories of the Department of Zoology, University of the Punjab, Quaid-e-Azam Campus, Lahore. Construction work on the CEMB building started in 1987 on a site located in Lahore's southern suburb of Thokar Niaz Baig along the Canal. The scientific staff moved into the new building in late 1992–93.

== Admission process ==
The centre offers M.Phil and Ph.D. in Molecular Biology. Annually, only 20-30 position for academically brilliant students with research aptitude, from all over the world, are available for M.Phil and Ph.D. The admission process is one of the toughest and highly competitive in Pakistan with admission rate of around 10% annually. A greater number of foreign scholars are also pursuing their M.Phil and PhD in the centre.

== Research groups ==
CEMB has the following research groups:

1. Applied and Functional Genomics
2. Bioinformatics
3. Congenital Mental Retardation
4. Crop Breeding and GMO Detection Group
5. Development of Recombinant Biopharmaceuticals
6. Forensic Research Lab
7. Forensic Services Lab
8. Hearing Impairment
9. Medical Genetics Group
10. Molecular Medicine
11. Molecular Virology and Molecular diagnostics
12. Plant Biosafety,
13. Plant Genomics,
14. Plant Transformation
15. Seed Biotechnology
16. Stem Cell Research
17. Vision Impairment

== Achievements ==
CEMB researchers have made a great contribution to Molecular Biology. Recently, CEMB has made Bt transgenic rice, Bt transgenic cotton and virus-free gladiolus, potato and tomato. Several kits are made for the PCR-based diagnosis of HCV and HBV . A total of 11 new deafness loci, 3 vision impairment loci and 17 new genes are discovered here. All these results have been published in the form of research papers in more than 100 international journals of high reputation including Nature, American Journal of Human Genetics, European Journal of Human Genetics, Molecular Vision, Virology Journal, Infectious Diseases, PLoS, Differentiation, Forensic Science International and International Journal of Legal Medicine. Besides, CEMB holds the rights to 7 patents for inventions made by its scientists. In recognition of these achievements, Islamic Development Bank conferred it with Science and Technology Prize in 2008.

== International collaborations ==
As research in general and molecular biology in particular is an expensive business to do, CEMB often has collaborations with many national and international research institutes. These include National Institute of Health (NIH) USA, University of Cincinnati, University of Washington, University of Arizona, Johns-Hopkins University, Brigham Young University and US Department of Agriculture.

== Local collaborations ==
CEMB also has linkages with local institutes like Quaid-e-Azam University Islamabad, University of Veterinary and Animal Sciences Lahore, University of Lahore, Lahore College for Women University, Forman Christian University Lahore, Comsats Islamabad, Abdul Wali Khan University Mardan, Bahauddin Zakariya University Multan, Government College University Lahore, Government College University Faisalabad, Baluchistan University of Information Technology, Engineering and Management Sciences, Quetta, Sheikh Zayed Hospital Lahore, University of Health Sciences Lahore, Jinnah Hospital Lahore, King Edwards Medical University Lahore and Allama Iqbal Medical College Lahore.

== CEMB and CAMB ==
CEMB is under the administrative control of the Ministry of Education (MOE) and CAMB is under the administrative control of the Ministry of Science and Technology (MOST). Although, both are independent and autonomous, CEMB is the academic and basic research wing while CAMB is the applied and commercial production wing.
