= Satan Takes A Holiday (band) =

Swedish band

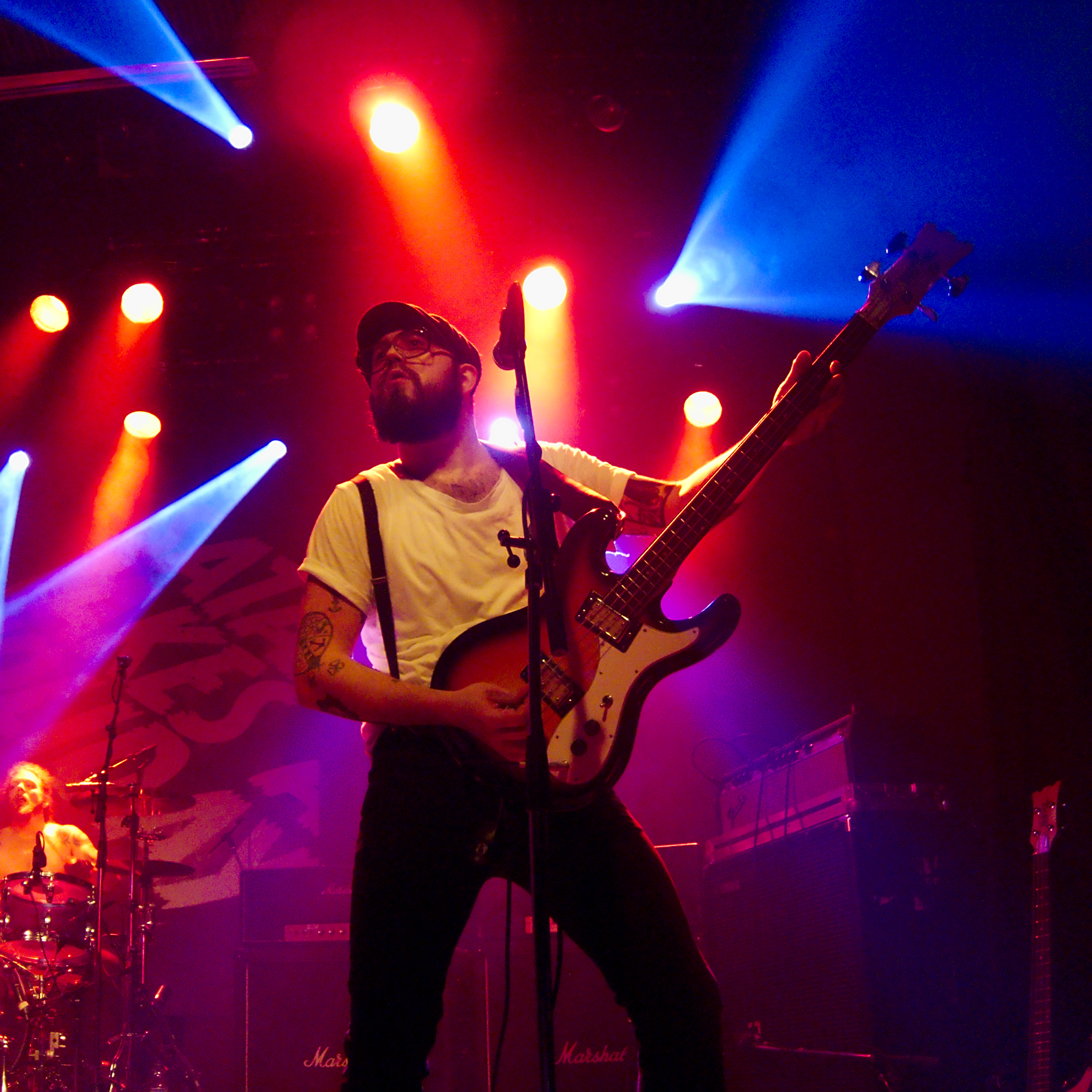

Background information
- Also known as: STAH
- Origin: Stockholm, Sweden
- Genres: Garage rock, Alternative Rock, Punk rock
- Years active: 2006 – present
- Labels: Despotz Records, I Made This, STAH Music, Versity Rights, Universal
- Members: Fred Burman Johannes Lindsjöö Danne McKenzie
- Past members: Svante Nordström

Satan Takes A Holiday is a Stockholm-based band, created in 2006 by Fred Burman, Johannes Lindsjöö and Svante Nordström.

The band released the self-titled debut album in late 2009. A few months later they were nominated in the Best Rock category at the Swedish P3 Guld Awards, and the songs “Missy” and “Heartbreaker” were played regularly on the radio.

The second album Who Do You Voodoo was released March 2012, preceded by the single "Karma Babe".

In June 2013 they opened for Kiss together with Hardcore Superstar at Friends Arena in Stockholm.

In spring 2014, they released the double A-sided single - "Talk of The Town" / "This Microphone", followed by the third full-length album "Animal Man Woman" in November 2014.

Swedish Despotz Records signed a record deal with Satan Takes A Holiday in 2016. The label released the singles "The Beat" and "Ladder To Climb", which both come from "Aliens", the band's fourth full-length album, released on February 24, 2016.

With their mix of rock and roll, sixties’ garage and punk rock, Satan Takes A Holiday have received many positive reviews both for their recorded music, and for their live performances.

== Members ==
- Fred Burman – guitar, lead vocals
- Johannes Lindsjöö – bass guitar, vocals
- Danne McKenzie - drums, backing vocals

== Past members ==
- Svante Nordström – drums, vocals

== Discography ==
=== Albums ===
- Satan Takes A Holiday (2009)
- Who Do You Voodoo (2012)
- Animal Man Woman (2014)
- Aliens (2017)
- A New Sensation (2019)
- Satanism (2023)

=== Singles ===
- Come Over (I Make You Look Good) (2007)
- Karma Babe (2012)
- Who Do You Voodoo (2012)
- Radio (2013)
- This Microphone/Talk of The Town (2014)
- Zombie Hands (2014)
- Pony High (2015)
- The Beat (2016)
- Ladder To Climb (2017)
- Love Me Like I Love Me (2017)

=== Compilations ===
- Tyst För Fan – Ekon Från Ebba Grön (2013) where Satan Takes A Holiday appears with the Ebba Grön cover "Häng Gud"
