= 1993 in heavy metal music =

This is a timeline documenting the events of heavy metal music in the year 1993.

== Newly formed bands ==
- Abigor
- Ablaze My Sorrow
- Acid King
- Adorned Brood
- Aeternus
- Anata
- Apocalyptica
- Arckanum
- Artension
- Aura Noir
- Avalanch
- Bestial Warlust
- Botch
- Breach
- Burst
- Capharnaum
- Children of Bodom (as Inearthed)
- Cirith Gorgor
- Cirrha Niva
- Coal Chamber
- Dark Funeral
- Dark Moor
- Darkwoods My Betrothed
- Deeds of Flesh
- Defeated Sanity
- Demoniac
- Diabolical Masquerade
- Dimmu Borgir
- The Donnas
- Dub War
- Einherjer
- Electric Wizard
- Enthroned
- Extol
- Filter
- Forgotten Silence
- Funeral Mist
- Gehenna
- God Lives Underwater
- Grip Inc.
- HammerFall
- Hanzel und Gretyl
- Hecate Enthroned
- Horna
- Keep of Kalessin
- Korn
- Korpiklaani
- Lacrimas Profundere
- Limbonic Art
- Madder Mortem
- Manes
- Mass Hysteria
- Melechesh
- Midvinter
- Misery Loves Co.
- Mournful Congregation
- Mushroomhead
- Nagelfar
- Nazxul
- Nile
- Nocte Obducta
- Nothingface
- Old Man's Child
- Orphanage
- Panzerchrist
- Papa Roach
- Pegazus
- Pist.On
- Rhapsody of Fire
- Rotten Sound
- Sacrificium
- Sear Bliss
- Setherial
- Sheavy
- Six Feet Under
- Slash's Snakepit
- Spastic Ink
- Storm
- Strongarm
- Summoning
- Superjoint
- Taake
- Theatre of Tragedy
- Thou Art Lord
- To/Die/For
- Tsjuder
- Tulus
- Ulver
- Unholy Grave
- Ved Buens Ende
- Vlad Tepes
- Vomitorial Corpulence
- Voodoocult
- Waylander
- Zao

== Reformed bands ==
- Atheist
- Cream- for a few shows
- Dio
- Dokken

== Albums ==
- Accept – Objection Overruled
- Aerosmith – Get a Grip
- Alleycat Scratch – Deadboys in Trash City
- Aggressor – Procreate the Petrifactions
- Amorphis – Privilege of Evil (EP)
- Anacrusis – Screams and Whispers
- Anathema – Serenades
- Anal Cunt – Everyone Should Be Killed
- Angra – Angels Cry
- Annihilator – Set the World on Fire
- Anthrax – Sound of White Noise
- April Wine – Attitude
- Arcade – Arcade
- At the Gates – With Fear I Kiss the Burning Darkness
- Atheist – Elements
- Axxis – The Big Thrill
- Bad Brains – Rise
- Believer – Dimensions
- Beherit – Drawing Down the Moon
- Benediction – Transcend the Rubicon
- Beowülf – Un-Sentimental
- Blue Murder – Nothin but Trouble
- Brujería – Matando Güeros
- Brutality – Screams of Anguish
- Brutal Truth – Perpetual Conversion (EP)
- Bulletboys – Za-Za
- Burzum – Aske (EP)
- Burzum – Det som engang var
- Cancer – The Sins of Mankind
- Cannibal Corpse – Hammer Smashed Face (EP)
- Carcass – Heartwork
- Cathedral – The Ethereal Mirror
- Cherry St. – Squeeze it Dry
- Child'ƨ Play – Long Way
- Clawfinger – Deaf Dumb Blind
- Comecon – Converging Conspiracies
- Conception – Parallel Minds
- Count Raven - High on Infinity
- Coverdale/Page – Coverdale/Page
- Craig Goldy – Insufficient Therapy
- Cro-Mags – Near Death Experience
- Crowbar – Crowbar
- Cynic – Focus
- Damaged – Do Not Spit
- Damn the Machine - Damn the Machine
- Danzig – Thrall-Demonsweatlive
- Darkthrone – Under a Funeral Moon
- Dark Tranquillity – Skydancer
- Death – Individual Thought Patterns
- Deceased – 13 Frightened Souls (EP)
- Deep Purple – The Battle Rages On
- Def Leppard – Retro Active (compilation)
- Deliverance – Learn
- Desultory – Into Eternity
- Dio – Strange Highways (Europe release)
- Disincarnate – Dreams of the Carrion Kind
- Dismember – Indecent & Obscene
- Dissection – The Somberlain
- Dream Theater – Live at the Marquee
- Earth (American band) – Earth 2 (album)
- Earthshaker – Real
- Earthshaker – Yesterday & Tomorrow
- Edge of Sanity – The Spectral Sorrows
- Entombed – Wolverine Blues
- Entombed – Hollowman (EP)
- Enuff Z'nuff – Animals with Human Intelligence
- Europe – 1982–1992 (compilation)
- Every Mothers Nightmare – Wake up Screaming
- Eyehategod – Take as Needed for Pain
- Fight – War of Words
- Fishbone – Give a Monkey a Brain and He'll Swear He's the Center of the Universe
- Gamma Ray – Insanity and Genius
- The Gathering – Almost a Dance
- Genitorturers – 120 Days of Genitorture
- Gorguts – The Erosion of Sanity
- Grave – ...And Here I Die... Satisfied (EP)
- Guns N' Roses – The Spaghetti Incident?
- Helloween – Chameleon
- Hittman – Vivas Machina
- Hypocrisy – Osculum Obscenum
- Hypocrisy – Pleasure of Molestation (EP)
- Illdisposed – Four Depressive Seasons
- Immortal – Pure Holocaust
- Impaled Nazarene – Ugra Karma
- Iron Maiden – A Real Live One (Live)
- Iron Maiden – A Real Dead One (Live)
- Iron Maiden – Live at Donington (Live)
- Judas Priest – Metal Works '73–'93 (Compilation)
- Kataklysm – The Mystical Gate of Reincarnation (EP)
- Katatonia – Dance of December Souls
- Kingdom Come – Bad Image
- Kiss – Alive III (live)
- KMFDM – Angst
- Konkhra – Sexual Affective Disorder
- Krabathor – Cool Mortification
- Lacrimosa – Satura
- Life of Agony – River Runs Red
- Living Colour – Stain
- Love/Hate – Let's Rumble
- Macabre – Sinister Slaughter
- Tony MacAlpine – Madness
- Marduk – Those of the Unlight
- Malevolent Creation – Stillborn
- Duff McKagan – Believe in Me
- Melvins – Houdini
- Memento Mori - Rhymes of Lunacy
- Mercyful Fate – In the Shadows
- Metal Church – Hanging in the Balance
- Metallica – Live Shit: Binge & Purge (live box set)
- Morbid Angel – Covenant
- Morgana Lefay – Knowing Just as I
- Morgana Lefay – The Secret Doctrine
- Morgoth – Odium
- Mortician – Mortal Massacre (EP)
- Mortification – Post Momentary Affliction
- Monster Magnet – Superjudge
- Motörhead – Bastards
- Mr Big – Bump Ahead
- My Dying Bride – Turn Loose the Swans
- My Dying Bride – The Thrash of Naked Limbs (EP)
- Necrophobic – The Nocturnal Silence
- Necrophobic – The Call (EP)
- Neurosis – Enemy of the Sun
- Ningen Isu – Rashōmon
- Nirvana – In Utero
- Nuclear Assault – Something Wicked
- Orphaned Land - The Beloved's Cry (demo)
- Overkill – I Hear Black
- Pan.Thy.Monium – Khaooohs
- Paradise Lost – Icon
- Pearl Jam – Vs.
- Pestilence – Spheres
- Phantom Blue – Built to Perform
- Pitchshifter – Desensitized
- Pungent Stench – Dirty Rhymes & Psychotronic Beats (EP)
- Quiet Riot – Terrified
- Rage – The Missing Link
- Riot - Nightbreaker
- Robert Plant – Fate of Nations
- Rotting Christ – Thy Mighty Contract
- Rush – Counterparts
- Sacred Reich – Independent
- Satyricon – Dark Medieval Times
- Savatage – Edge of Thorns
- Scorpions – Face the Heat
- Sentenced – North from Here
- Sepultura – Chaos A.D.
- Shotgun Messiah – Violent New Breed
- Sick of It All – Live in a World Full of Hate (live)
- Sinister – Diabolical Summoning
- Sinner – Respect
- Sleep – Sleep's Holy Mountain
- Smashing Pumpkins – Siamese Dream
- Steve Vai – Sex & Religion
- Suffocation – Breeding the Spawn
- Tad – Inhaler
- Tad Morose – Leaving the Past Behind
- Talisman – Genesis
- Therapy? – Hats Off to the Insane
- Therion – Symphony Masses: Ho Drakon Ho Megas
- Threshold – Wounded Land
- Tool – Undertow
- Transmetal – Dante's Inferno
- Treponem Pal – Excess and Overdrive
- Type O Negative – Bloody Kisses
- Unanimated – In the Forest of the Dreaming Dead
- Uncle Slam – Will Work for Food
- Unleashed – Across the Open Sea
- Van Halen – Live: Right Here, Right Now (live)
- Vince Neil – Exposed
- Vio-lence – Nothing to Gain
- Voïvod – The Outer Limits
- Warrior Soul – Chill Pill
- Winger – Pull
- X Japan – Art of Life

== Events ==
- Accept reforms with Udo Dirkshneider on vocals for a new album and European/American tour
- After a brief hiatus, Atheist reform to record their final album, Elements, in order to finish their third album contract to their record label. After this, the band breaks up again a year later.
- Bruce Dickinson leaves Iron Maiden. Wolfsbane's singer Blaze Bayley is chosen to replace him.
- Rob Halford of Judas Priest leaves the band to start his own project Fight
- The band Betrayer assumes the name Belphegor
- Michael Kiske of Helloween leaves the band for personal reasons. He was replaced by Andi Deris.
- Alex Skolnick and Louie Clemente of Testament are out of the band and replaced by James Murphy on guitar and John Tempesta on drums. Skolnick later joins Savatage to replace the late Criss Oliva.
- Euronymous – guitarist and mainman of Norwegian black metal band Mayhem as well as founder and manager of record label Deathlike Silence Productions and Oslo store Helvete – was murdered on August 10, by fellow black metal musician Varg Vikernes (aka Count Grishnackh) of one-man band Burzum as well as bassist of Mayhem.
- Criss Oliva of Savatage was killed in a car crash on October 17 by a drunk driver.
- Japanese power metal band X changes their name to "X Japan".

Preceded by 1992	Heavy Metal Timeline; 1993	Succeeded by 1994
