= 1994 in heavy metal music =

This is a timeline documenting the events of heavy metal music in the year 1994.

== Newly formed bands ==
- 20 Dead Flower Children
- 36 Crazyfists
- Abaddon Incarnate
- Abscess
- Abstrakt Algebra
- The Abyss
- Agoraphobic Nosebleed
- Amen
- Antaeus
- Aurora Borealis
- Behexen
- Blindside
- Blut Aus Nord
- Coalesce
- Colour Haze
- Corrupted
- Craft
- Creed
- Dark Fortress
- Deadguy
- Deströyer 666
- DGM
- Disillusion
- Dismal Euphony
- Disturbed (as Brawl)
- Dødheimsgard
- Draconian
- Edguy
- Ektomorf
- Empyrium
- Epoch Of Unlight
- Eternal Tears of Sorrow
- Evoken
- Flowing Tears
- Gluecifer
- Gov't Mule
- Graveworm
- Gravity Kills
- Guano Apes
- Hatebreed
- Heavenly
- Hed PE
- The Hellacopters
- Hollenthon
- Hoobastank
- Horde
- Iron Monkey
- Kalisia
- Kampfar
- Knut
- Kobong
- Kronos
- Lacuna Coil
- Lake of Tears
- Lamb of God (as Burn the Priest)
- Limbonic Art
- Limp Bizkit
- Lost Horizon
- Lux Occulta
- Martyr
- Melechesh
- Mob Rules
- Moonspell
- Muse
- Mushroomhead
- Naer Mataron
- Nailbomb
- Necrophagist
- Negură Bunget
- Neuraxis
- Nightingale
- Nile
- Nothingface
- October Tide
- Officium Triste
- O.N.A.
- Page and Plant
- Portal
- Primordial
- Quo Vadis
- Ragnarok
- Rammstein
- Scarve
- Sevendust
- Siebenbürgen
- Six Feet Under
- Skylark
- Slash's Snakepit
- Spiritual Beggars
- Static-X
- Strapping Young Lad
- Stone Sour
- Suidakra
- Symphony X
- System of a Down
- Tenacious D
- Theatres des Vampires
- Throes of Dawn
- Thyrane
- Torque
- Trail of Tears
- Transport League
- Ulver
- Vintersorg
- Virgin Black
- Windir

== Albums ==
- Accept – Death Row
- Acid Bath – When the Kite String Pops
- Acid King – Acid King (EP)
- Alice Cooper – The Last Temptation
- Alice in Chains – Jar of Flies
- Aggressor – Of Long Duration Anguish
- The Almighty – Crank
- Altar - Youth Against Christ
- Amorphis – Tales from the Thousand Lakes
- Ancient – Svartalvheim
- Annihilator – King of the Kill
- Arcturus – Constellation (EP)
- Asphyx - Asphyx
- At the Gates - Terminal Spirit Disease
- Bang Tango – Love After Death
- Bathory – Requiem
- Behemoth – And the Forests Dream Eternally (EP)
- Benediction - The Grotesque / Ashen Epitaph (EP)
- Bestial Warlust - Vengeance War Till Death
- Biohazard – State of the World Address
- Black Sabbath – Cross Purposes
- The Black Crowes – Amorica
- Body Count – Born Dead
- Bolt Thrower – ...For Victory
- Bon Jovi – Cross Road (comp.)
- Bruce Dickinson – Balls to Picasso
- Brutality - When the Sky Turns Black
- Brutal Truth - Need to Control
- Burzum – Hvis lyset tar oss
- Cannibal Corpse – The Bleeding
- Cathedral – Cosmic Requiem (EP)
- Cathedral – In Memorium (EP)
- Cathedral – Statik Majik (EP)
- Cemetary – Black Vanity
- Cinderella – Still Climbing
- Converge – Halo in a Haystack
- Corrosion of Conformity – Deliverance
- Cradle of Filth – The Principle of Evil Made Flesh
- Cryptopsy – Blasphemy Made Flesh
- The Cult – The Cult
- Dangerous Toys – Pissed
- Danzig – Danzig 4
- Dark Funeral – Dark Funeral (EP)
- Darkthrone – Transilvanian Hunger
- Deliverance – River Disturbance
- Destruction – Destruction (EP)
- Desultory - Bitterness
- Dio – Strange Highways (US release)
- DGeneration – DGeneration
- Downset. – downset.
- Dream Theater – Awake
- Edge of Sanity – Purgatory Afterglow
- Electric Wizard – Electric Wizard
- Elegy - Supremacy
- Emperor – In the Nightside Eclipse
- Enslaved – Frost
- Enslaved – Vikingligr Veldi
- Evil Wings - Evil Wings
- Fates Warning – Inside Out
- Freak Kitchen – Appetizer
- Forbidden – Distortion
- Fu Manchu – No One Rides for Free
- Gehenna – First Spell (EP)
- Gilby Clarke – Pawnshop Guitars
- Godflesh – Selfless
- Gorefest – Erase
- Gorgoroth – Pentagram
- Gotthard – Dial Hard
- Grave - Soulless
- Gwar – This Toilet Earth
- H-Blockx - Time to Move
- Helloween – Master of the Rings
- Helmet – Betty
- Hypocrisy – The Fourth Dimension
- Impaled Nazarene – Suomi Finland Perkele
- In Flames – Lunar Strain
- Incantation – Mortal Throne of Nazarene
- Infectious Grooves – Groove Family Cyco
- Killing Joke – Pandemonium
- King's X – Dogman
- Korn – Korn
- Korpse - Pull the Flood
- Kyuss – Welcome to Sky Valley
- L.A. Guns – Vicious Circle
- Lake of Tears – Greater Art
- Love/Hate – Lets Rumble
- Luciferion - Demonication (The Manifest)
- Tony MacAlpine – Premonition
- Machine Head – Burn My Eyes
- Madball – Set It Off
- Magnum – Rock Art
- Yngwie Malmsteen – The Seventh Sign
- Manic Eden – Manic Eden
- Marduk – Opus Nocturne
- Marilyn Manson – Portrait of an American Family
- Mayhem – De Mysteriis Dom Sathanas
- Megadeth – Youthanasia
- Melvins – Stoner Witch
- Memento Mori - Life, Death, and Other Morbid Tales
- Mercyful Fate – Time
- Meshuggah – None (EP)
- Moonspell – Under the Moonspell (EP)
- Mortification - Blood World
- Mötley Crüe – Mötley Crüe
- My Dying Bride - I Am the Bloody Earth (EP)
- Nailbomb – Point Blank
- Napalm Death – Fear, Emptiness, Despair
- The New York Dolls – Rock'n Roll
- Nine Inch Nails – The Downward Spiral
- Nirvana – MTV Unplugged in New York
- No One Is Innocent – No One Is Innocent
- Occult – Prepare to Meet Thy Doom
- Obituary – World Demise
- The Obsessed – The Church Within
- Oomph! – Sperm
- Overkill – W.F.O.
- Pantera – Far Beyond Driven
- Pearl Jam – Vitalogy
- Pentagram - Be Forewarned
- Pitchshifter – The Remix War (remix)
- Pride & Glory – Pride & Glory
- Pro-Pain – The Truth Hurts
- Prong – Cleansing
- Pungent Stench - Club Mondo Bizarre – For Members Only
- P.O.D. – Snuff the Punk
- Queensrÿche – Promised Land
- Rage – 10 Years in Rage (compilation)
- Ram Jam – Nouvel Album (also released under the name Thank You Mam in 1995)
- Raxas - Esclavos Eternos
- Rollins Band – Weight
- Ron Wasserman – Mighty Morphin Power Rangers the Album: A Rock Adventure (soundtrack)
- Rotting Christ – Non Serviam
- Running Wild – Black Hand Inn
- Samael – Ceremony of Opposites
- Satyricon – The Shadowthrone
- Savatage – Handful of Rain
- Senser – Stacked Up
- Sentenced - The Trooper (EP)
- Septicflesh - Mystic Places of Dawn
- Skyclad – Prince of the Poverty Line
- Slayer – Divine Intervention
- Sodom – Get What You Deserve
- Solitude Aeturnus – Through the Darkest Hour
- Solstice – Lamentations
- Soundgarden – Superunknown
- Stabbing Westward – Ungod
- Stone Temple Pilots – Purple
- Stratovarius – Dreamspace
- Suicidal Tendencies – Suicidal for Life
- Symphony X – Symphony X
- Tankard – Two-Faced
- Testament – Low
- Therapy? – Troublegum
- Threshold – Psychedelicatessen
- The 3rd and the Mortal – Sorrow (EP)
- The 3rd and the Mortal – Tears Laid in Earth
- Tiamat – Wildhoney
- Tuff – Fist First
- Urban Dance Squad – Persona Non Grata
- Vader – Sothis (EP)
- Vanden Plas – Colour Temple
- Various Artists – Nativity in Black (Black Sabbath tribute album)
- Vicious Rumors – Word of Mouth
- Whitesnake – Greatest Hits
- Widowmaker – Stand By for Pain

== Disbandments ==
- Alleycat Scratch
- Atheist (reformed in 2006)
- Follow for Now
- Lost Horizon (then known as Highlander) (reformed in 1999)
- Metal Church (reformed in 1998)
- Nirvana

== Events ==
- Korn release their critically acclaimed self-titled debut album, which is generally considered the first ever "nu metal" album.
- Divine Intervention by Slayer peaks at Number 8 on the U.S. Billboard 200 chart, with 93,000 copies sold in its first week, and later that year was certified gold in Canada and United States.
- Nick Barker becomes the drummer for Cradle of Filth.
- Longtime Extreme drummer Paul Geary leaves the band is replaced by Michael Mangini.
- Testament release their sixth album Low. It is their first album recorded without original guitarist Alex Skolnick and drummer Louie Clemente, who both left the band a year before, and also their last with longtime bassist Greg Christian, who left two years later.
- Metallica, Danzig and Suicidal Tendencies embark on a U.S. tour together.
- Oomph! establish the rudiments of the Neue Deutsche Härte genre with their album Sperm.
- Vocalist Ralf Scheepers leaves Gamma Ray. He would later go on to form Primal Fear.

Preceded by 1993	Heavy Metal Timeline; 1994	Succeeded by 1995
