= Dong Open Air =

Heavy metal festival in Germany

- Genre: Heavy metal
- Dates: July
- Locations: Neukirchen-Vluyn, Germany
- Years active: 2001 onward
- Website: www.dongopenair.de

Dong Open Air is a heavy metal music festival held annually in Neukirchen-Vluyn, Germany since 2001.

== Lineups ==
=== 2001 ===
August 17–18: Blood Red Angel, Decapitation, Fianna, Guerrilla, Heartwork, Impure, N.R.G., Stripped Of Flesh, Yppah Nomed.

=== 2002 ===
July 19–20: Adorned Brood, Amityville, Blood Red Angel, Complex 7, Guerrilla, Fianna, Hate Factor, Mabus, N.R.G., Sarx, Schattenleben, Sencirow, Torture Chamber, Violet.

=== 2003 ===
July 18–19: Abaddon, Adorned Brood, Antifreeze, Burden of Grief, Folkedudl, Hate Factor, Night in Gales, Osyris, Psychotron, Ratsbane, Skyclad, Sun of Sadness, Violet, Witchtower.

=== 2004 ===
July 16–17: Chainheart, Crikey, Dark Suns, Disillusion, Equilibrium, Final Breath, Humanity, Insignium, Jack Slater, Jester's Funeral, Lanfear, My Darkest Hate, Seraphim, Suidakra, The Rules, Tomorrow's Eve, Vintersorg.

=== 2005 ===
July 15–16: Aardvarks, Behind the Scenery, Delirious, Desilence, Drawline, Elvenking, Excrementory Grindfuckers, Finntroll, Hate Factor, Intense, Mindcrime, Orkus, Perzonal War, President Evil, Ravage, Skyclad, Stormgarde, Sycronomica, Synasthasia, XIV Dark Centuries.

=== 2006 ===
July 14–15: Die Apokalyptischen Reiter, Commander, Contradiction, Dragonland, Grailknights, Guerrilla, Gun Barrel, Hidden In The Fog, Horrorscope, Lords Of Decadence, Motorjesus, Mystic Prophecy, Negator, Osyris, Rotting Christ, Savage Circus, Symbiontic, The Bonny Situation, Turisas.

=== 2007 ===
July 13–14: Absence, All We Hate, Black Messiah, Chainsaw, Cheeno, Dark Age, Darzamat, Debauchery, Eluveitie, Ensiferum, Galskap, Novembers Fall, Månegarm, Orphaned Land, Runamok, Sinister, Skyclad, Synasthasia, The Pokes, van Canto, Verdict.

=== 2008 ===
July 18–19: Civilization One, Commander, Dark Tranquillity, Drone, Grailknights, Grind Inc., Lyriel, Masterstroke, Moder, Morgana Lefay, Nohellia, Path of Golconda, Persefone, Raintime, Rocketchief, Sabaton, Sadist, Scarlet Fire, Sheephead, Suidakra, Torian

Primordial were supposed to play but cancelled, and Suidakra were the last-minute replacement.

=== 2009 ===
July 17–18: 7 Seals, Amorphis, Cast in Silence, Cheeno, Clanrock, Common Grave, Dornenreich, Elexorien, Failed Perfection, Hatred, In December, Interrobäng, Kingdom of Salvation, Orphan Hate, Rage, Sheephead, Skyclad, Splatter and Gore Department, Sycronomica, The Very End

Dew-Scented were supposed to be one of the headliners but cancelled due to sickness.

=== 2010 ===
July 23–24: Adorned Brood, All We Hate, Blood Red Angel, Dark Tranquillity, Debauchery, Die Apokalyptischen Reiter, Excrementory Grindfuckers, Folkedud/Chainheart, Grailknights, Gun Barrel, Hate Factor, Insignium, Jack Slater, Motorjesus, Orphan Hate, Persefone, Raintime, Rotting Christ, Skyclad, Synasthasia, Van Canto

=== 2011 ===
July 14–16: Artas, Balfor, Bloodwork, Canopy, Contradiction, Crosshead, Dew-Scented, Evile, Hackneyed, Harasai, Hatesphere, Iced Earth, Ichor, Motorjesus, Orden Ogan, Overkill, Past M.D., Ranz Böllner & die Heavy Metal Warriors, Red Circuit, Shellycoat, Shraphead, Symbolic, The Rotted, Virgin Snatch, Vogelfrey, Vulture Industries

=== 2012 ===
July 12–14: Aardvarks, Armored Saint, Basanos, Betontod, Black Blitz, Burden Of Grief, Circle of Silence, Collapse, Cyrcus, Davidian, Drone, Eastern Front, HungÖver, Knorkator, Napalm Death, Night In Gales, Omnicide, One Bullet Left, Path of Golconda, Pictura, Rage, Revolving Door, Sepultura, Soldiers Of Rock, Suidakra, The Very End

=== 2013 ===
July 11–13: Act of Worship, Acyl, Aeons Confer, Any Given Day, Born From Pain, Crossplane, Dark Tranquillity, Elvenpath, Exotoxis, Finntroll, Fyrnreich, Godslave, Hatred, In Arkadia, J.T. Ripper, Kadavrik, Kamikaze Kings, Powerwolf, Ravian, Rotting Empire, Scornage, Skyclad, Sodom, Soulfly, Spectral, Superbutt, The Other, Truckfighters, Words of Farewell

=== 2014 ===
July 17–19: Annihilator, Arch Enemy, Ashes Of A Lifetime, Contradiction, Disquiet, Dystopera, Gloryful, Grailknights, Grave Digger, Hail of Bullets, Harasai, Iwrestledabearonce, Katalepsy, Maat, Milking The Goatmachine, Motorjesus, Negator, Pappe Of Destiny, Paragon, Satan, Scarab, Scarnival, Skiltron, Texas In July, The Crimson Ghosts, The Scalding, Torian, Vulture Industries

=== 2015 ===
July 16–18 : Carcass, Eluveitie, Gamma Ray, Acyl, Beyond the Black, Butwetryit, Crossplane, Debauchery, Die apokalyptischen Reiter, Fiddlers Green, Gil Gamesh, Kissin' Dynamite, Sunchair, The Black Dahlia Murder, Torturized, Vogelfrey, War Kabinett, Wizard, Words of Farewell, Wulfpack, Excremetory Grindfuckers, Mantar, Miseo, The Prosecution, Insanity

=== 2016 ===
July 14-16: Amorphis, Equilibrium, Testament, Another Problem, Apron, Bloodbath, Burden of Gried, Can of Worms, Craving, Delirious, Dust Bolt, Elvellon, Fleshgod Apocalypse, Gloryful, Hackneyed, Harpyie, Jesus Chrüsler Supercar, Kadavrik, Kryptos, Rage, Raven Woods, Skyclad, Suidakra, The Pokes.

=== 2017 ===
In Extremo, Iced Earth, Elvenking, Darkest Horizon, God Dethroned, Ensiferum, HateSphere, Messiah's Kiss, Sisters of Suffocation, Vulture Industries, Words of Farewell, Aeverium, Atomgott, Contradiction, Dark Tranquillity, Fateful Finality, Misanthrope Monarch, Nervosa, War Kabinett, Copia, Crossplane, Gloryhammer, Lord Vigo, Memoriam, Munarheim, Spoil Engine, Storm Seeker.

=== 2018 ===
Eluveitie, Exodus, Die Apokalyptischen Reiter, Korpiklaani, Moonspell, Motorjesus, Triddana, Night in Gales, Destruction, Scardust, Visigoth, Impureza, Infected Rain, Vogelfrey, Alvenrad, Betontod, Drone, Grailknights, Jinjer, Mantar, Skindred, The Monolith Deathcult, Torian.

=== 2019 ===
July 11-13: Alestorm, Steel Panther, Kataklysm, Gloryhammer, Insomnium, Battle Beast, Dog Eat Dog, Septicflesh, Deserted Fear, Dust Bolt, Bloodywood, Wulfpäck, Craving, Hideous Divinity, Storm Seeker, Impureza, Silver Talon, Rising Insane, Deathcode Society, Silius, Blessed Hellride, Elvellon, AngelInc, Snakebite, The Crimson Ghosts, Victim, Solar Fragment, Source of Rage, Empyreal.

=== 2022 ===
July 14-16: Divide, Eridu, Volter, Scardust, Brothers Of Metal, Knorkator, Testament, Staredown, Sisters of Suffocation, Doctor Victor, Finsterforst, Surgical Strike, Tyler Leads, Nanowar Of Steel, Blaze Bayley, Fiddler's Green, Blind Guardian, Dirty Shirt, Galactic Superlords, Disillusion, 1914, Wind Rose, Skyclad, Memoriam, Emil Bulls, Skindred.

=== 2023 ===
July 13-15: Call of Charon, Burden of Grief, Fateful Finality, Blessed Hellride, Angus McSix, Warkings, Eluveitie, Epica, damn!escape, Cantus Levitas, Außerwelt, The Crimson Ghosts, Words of Farewell, Diablo Swing Orchestra, Onslaught, Asphyx, Hämatom, Saltatio Mortis, Hans Lazer Alien Slam, Disquiet, Sapiency, Contradiction, From Fall to Spring, Motorjesus, Kanonenfieber, Insomnium, Hypocrisy, Amorphis.

=== 2024 ===
July 11-13: Behemoth, Die Apokalyptischen Reiter, Deserted Fear, Escuela Grind, Drone, Tyranthrope, In Extremo, Equilibrium, Nanowar of Steel, Dust Bolt, The Night Eternal, Wucan, Subterranean Masquerade, Neurotic Machinery, Steelpreacher, Nephylim, Blind Guardian, Any Given Day, The Night Flight Orchestra, Harakiri for the Sky, The Gems, Chaosbay, Vulture Industries, Elvellon, Scarnival, Aexylium.
