= Skydancer =

Skydancer or variants may refer to:

- Inflatable man, air puppet used in outdoors advertising
- Hen harriers commonly referred to as "skydancers" in the UK and Ireland due to their aerial mating displays
- Sky Dancers, range of dolls

== Albums ==
- Skydancer (Dark Tranquillity album), 1993
- Skydancer (In Hearts Wake album), 2015
