= Periscope (disambiguation) =

A periscope is a device for viewing things past obstacles.

Periscope may also refer to:

- Periscope (album), 1999 stoner/psychedelic rock album by Colour Haze
- Periscope (app), a video streaming app
- Periscope (arcade game), a 1960s coin-operated arcade game by Namco and Sega
- Le périscope, a 1916 film by Abel Gance
- Periscope Entertainment, a Los Angeles-based film company
- Periscope Pictures, a film production company based in Prince Edward Island, Canada
- Periscope Studio, a comics and illustration studio based in Portland, Oregon, USA
- Periscope (agency), an advertising agency in Minneapolis, Minnesota
- Periscope lens, a type of lens used in filmography and photography
