= Damn the Machine (album) =

Studio album by Damn the Machine
- Released: 1993
- Studio: 41-B Studios, Westlake, Los Angeles
- Genre: Heavy metal, progressive metal
- Length: 47:19
- Label: A&M
- Producer: Damn the Machine, Brian Malouf

Damn the Machine is a studio album by American heavy metal band Damn the Machine, released in 1993 through A&M Records. It features former Megadeth guitarist Chris Poland, and remains the band's only release. The band supported the album by touring with Voivod.

== Critical reception ==
Professional ratings
Review scores
Source	Rating
AllMusic	2.5/5 stars
Rock Hard	9.5/10
Sputnikmusic	4.5/5 stars

In 2005, Damn the Machine was ranked number 64 in Rock Hard magazine's book The 500 Greatest Rock & Metal Albums of All Time.

== Track listing ==
All tracks are written by Damn the Machine

No.	Title	Length
1.	"The Mission"	4:19
2.	"Fall of Order"	3:45
3.	"Corporate Reign"	3:30
4.	"Honor"	3:51
5.	"Lonesome God"	3:26
6.	"On with the Dream"	4:31
7.	"Patriot"	2:47
8.	"I Will"	2:49
9.	"Silence"	4:58
10.	"Russians"	5:40
11.	"Countryside"	3:20
12.	"Humans"	4:23
Total length:		47:19

== Personnel ==
Damn the Machine

- David Judson Clemmons – lead vocals, guitar, production
- Chris Poland – guitar, background vocals, production
- Mark Poland – drums, background vocals, production
- Dave Randi – bass, background vocals, production

Technical personnel

- Pat MacDougall – engineering
- Brian Malouf – engineering, mixing, production
- Howie Weinberg – mastering
