= To the Highest Gods We Know =

To The Highest Gods We Know

Studio album by Colour Haze
- Released: 2014
- Studio: Colour Haz Studio
- Genres: Stoner rock Psychedelic rock
- Length: 41:57
- Label: Elektrohasch Schallplatten

Colour Haze chronology
She Said (2012)	To The Highest Gods We Know (2014)	In Her Garden (2017)

To The Highest Gods We Know is the eleventh full-length album by the German stoner rock band Colour Haze. The album was released in 2014 by Elektrohasch Schallplatten.

The album was "reworked" and re-released in 2025. Also boasting new artwork, there were "counterpoints added, arrangements fleshed out, and the songs progressed".

== Reception ==
Plattentests.de rated the album 7 out of 10. The band "shouldn't be dismissed as a Kyuss copycat", but "anyone who only listens superficially gets exactly what they expect: another album from a genre that never quite managed to break free from the '90s". According to Visions.de, Colour Haze showcased an "urge to break free from the constraints of their typical, Kyuss-influenced stoner rock sound", and managed to "captivate" and "explore their genre to its fullest potential". The score was 8 out of 12.

Rock Hard gave an 8 out of 10. Powermetal.de went even higher, 9 out of 10. The reviewer opined that the album managed to "immediately captivate" him, almost to a hypnotical degree. Following a catchy opening, tracks 3 through 5 "takes you through the desert, over mountains, into outer space, and into another dimension"; the latter was "among the very best the band has ever recorded". The band "sound more experienced, more seasoned, and more intelligent than ever before", and the album was over too quickly.

== Track listing ==
1. "Circles" – 8:23
2. "Paradise" – 3:34
3. "Überall" – 8:22
4. "Call" – 8:14
5. "To the Highest Gods We Know" – 11:52
6. "Last Call" – 1:32

== Personnel ==
- Stefan Koglek − vocals, guitar
- Philipp Rasthoffer − bass guitar
- Manfred Merwald − drums

Guest musicians

- Werner Aldinger, Albrecht Huber – horns
- David Eschenbach – flute
- Christian Hawellek – Hammond M3 organ, synthesizer
- Modern String Quartet – strings
