= Tempel (Colour Haze album) =

Studio album by Colour Haze
- Released: 2006
- Recorded: May–June 2006
- Studios: Institut For Wohlklangforschun, Hannover, Germany
- Genre: Stoner rock
- Length: 48:17
- Label: Elektrohasch Schallplatten

Colour Haze chronology
| Colour Haze (2004) | Tempel (2006) | All (2008) |

Tempel is the eighth full-length album by the German stoner rock band Colour Haze. The album was released in 2006 by Elektrohasch Schallplatten.

== Reception ==
Norway's Scream Magazine gave a 5 out of 6 score to Tempel, ironically warning readers to consider whether they should buy the album, lest they become hooked. The reviewer associated the sound with the year 1971, as well as Kyuss. Powermetal.de drew the same comparison, stating that Colour Haze were "practically riding the coattails of Kyuss", but in doing so, "the guys effortlessly manage to captivate with their languid, soulful, and relaxed compositions". The songs "never become tedious" and were immersive. Visions.de gave a strong score similar to that of Scream, 9 out of 12.

Ox-Fanzine praised "their technically flawless and top-notch production", though the music evoked Kyuss too much, as well as Krautrock. The Kyuss comparison was also what "immediately and relentlessly springs to mind" for the reviewer in Vampster. While Kyuss' music was "a bit more compelling and fresh, I can wholeheartedly recommend 'Tempel' to all fans of the aforementioned music". Metal.de opined that Colour Haze "are riding the 70s retro wave full throttle". Already by the second track, "it's clear the hippies had lost their marbles", and the reviewer asked the readers to "do yourself a favor and stay away from" Tempel. The rating was only 3 out of 10.

In the US, The Aquarian Weekly noted that the label Elektrohasch did not have US distribution. That was a pity, since "Tempel is, indeed, worthy of worship. The cover artwork was also "strikingly beautiful".

== Track listing ==
1. "Aquamaria" – 8:46
2. "Fire" – 5:48
3. "Mind" – 3:02
4. "Tempel" – 8:31
5. "Gold & Silver" – 6:38
6. "Earth" – 4:02
7. "Ozean" – 4:31
8. "Stratofarm" – 6:59

== Personnel ==
- Stefan Koglek − vocals, guitar, lyrics
- Philipp Rasthoffer − bass guitar
- Willi Dammeier − drums
