= Chmury nie było =

Studio album by Kobong
- Released: June 1997
- Recorded: November 1996; January - February 1997
- Genre: Avant-garde metal
- Length: 67:25
- Label: Metal Mind Productions

Chmury nie było is the second studio album by the Polish experimental metal band Kobong. Most of the album was recorded between January and February 1997 in studio D-7 in Wisła, while the acoustic versions of "Przeciwko" and "Prbda" were recorded live in the studio in November 1996.

== Track listing ==
No.	Title	Length
1.	"Lust"	4:34
2.	"The Cloud Is Gone"	4:43
3.	"Miara"	4:16
4.	"FX"	0:45
5.	"Przeciwko" (acoustic)	3:44
6.	"Ja"	5:10
7.	"Nothing More Happens than Has to Happen"	5:38
8.	"Impro"	2:32
9.	"Uroboro"	3:29
10.	"Nędza"	4:23
11.	"Banjo"	2:16
12.	"Rwanda"	4:30
13.	"Przeciwko"	3:25
14.	"Prbda" (acoustic)	3:24
15.	"The Faithful"	5:39
16.	"I'll Wallow"	9:15
Total length:		67:25

== Personnel ==
- Bogdan Kondracki - bass, vocals
- Robert Sadowski - guitar
- Wojciech Szymański - drums
- Maciej Miechowicz - guitar
