= Alvenrad =

Dutch folk metal band

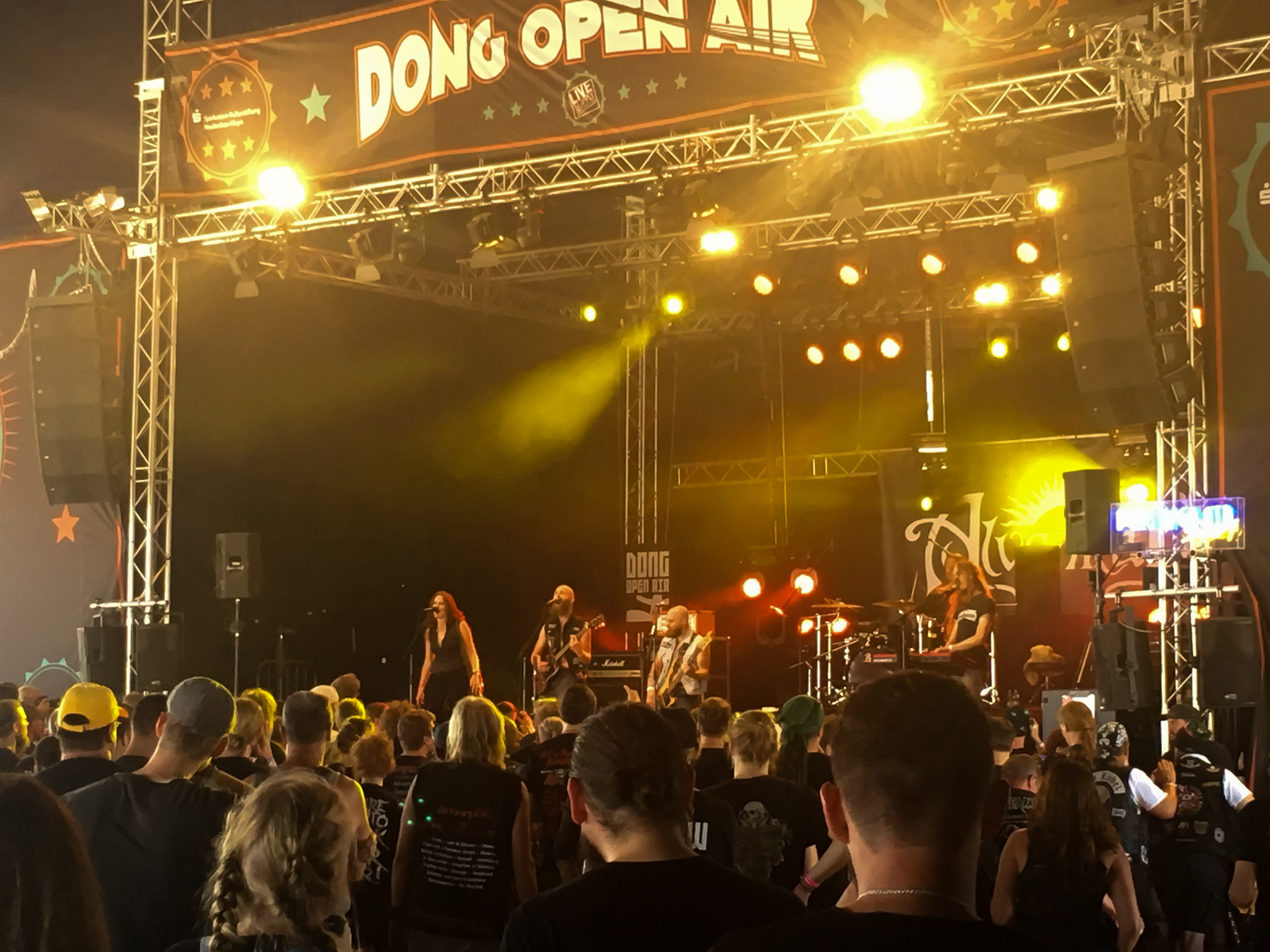

Background information
- Genres: heavy metal, folk metal, black metal
- Years active: 2011–present
- Label: Luidheim
- Members: Mark Bertszoon (vocals, guitar); Jasper Strik (vocals, keys); Thijs Kwint (bass); Nathanael Taekema (drums); Maurits van der Held (guitar)
- Website: www.alvenrad.net

Alvenrad is a folk metal band from the Veluwe region of the Netherlands. The band originally incorporated folk, heavy metal and Progressive Rock elements into its music, but is currently somewhat more oriented towards black metal and pagan metal. The poetic lyrics are written in Dutch, using Alliterative verse in Skaldic style. The band name is a loose translation of the Old Icelandic álfröðull.

== History ==
In 2009 Mark Bertszoon and Jasper Strik founded the band "Faelwa". In the same year they released the EP Farewell Sun under this name This release was heavily inspired by Tenhi en Empyrium. In 2010, the duo started a new project by the name of "Stormsterk", releasing an album called Wild en Bijster Land, a Norse style folk rock release. Talent scout Thor Joakimsson of Prophecy Productions, was enthusiastic about both releases and in 2013, after hearing of their plans to form Alvenrad, offered the duo a record deal on his label Trollmusic, with its close ties to Prophecy Productions.

In 2014 Alvenrad released their debut album Habitat They worked with Ancient Rites' guitarist Erik Sprooten. Mastering was done by Markus Stock, known for his role as front man of Empyrium. The album was positively reviewed by Aardschok magazine Rockerilla, Rock Hard and Legacy magazine.

On 28 July 2016 in Balve, Germany, Alvenrad performed live on stage for the first time at Prophecy Fest. On 28 April 2017 Alvenrad opened for Empyrium and Les Discrets in Oberhausen. In that year they also wrote and produced their second album.

On 8 December 2017 the band released Heer. Featuring beside Mark and Jasper were Thijs Kwint on bass and Ingmar Regeling on drums. Guest musicians included Hanna van Gorcum on Nyckelharpa. This album was thematically based on Skírnismál. Mixing and mastering was done by Markus Stock in Klangschmiede Studio E. The cover art was created by David Thiérrée. 'De Zonne-ever' was released as single and got picked up by Arrow Classic Rock.

In 2019, the band toured with Heidevolk, while also writing and recording their third album, titled Veluws IJzer. They were joined by drummer Nathanael Taekema (Thomas Zwijsen, ex-Cirrha Niva) and drums were recorded in E-Sound Studio by Thomas Cochrane. Guest musicians included Tineke Roseboom (vocals), Thomas Cochrane (brass), Hanna van Gorcum (violin), Antal van Ass (recorder), Rosie Taekema (cello), Thirza Fekkes (woodwind). Markus Skroch of Kalthallen provided the mix en mastering.

The album was released on 23 September 2022 under the newly formed Luidheim label. The album celebrated many facets of the Veluwe region and featured artwork by Gust van de Wall Perné. With support from Poppunt Gelderland and the Prins Bernard Culture Fund two music videos were produced to coincide with the release: 'De Stuwwal' and 'Roodwild'.

== Discography ==
- 2014: Habitat (Trollmusic)
- 2017: Heer (Trollmusic)
- 2022: Veluws IJzer (Luidheim)

== Band members (current) ==
- Mark Bertszoon: vocals, guitar
- Jasper Strik: keys, vocals
- Thijs Kwint: bass
- Nathanael Taekema: drums
- Maurits van der Held: lead guitar
