= Ascending in Synergy =

Studio album by Elvellon
- Released: 17 May 2024
- Recorded: 2021–2023
- Studio: Tonstudio Liebling, Duisburg, Germany
- Genre: Symphonic metal
- Length: 56:46
- Label: Napalm Records
- Producer: Gilbert Gelsdorf

Elvellon chronology
Until Dawn (2018)	Ascending in Synergy (2024)

Professional ratings
Review scores
Source	Rating
Chaoszine	3.5/5
Metal.de	8/10
Powermetal.de	9/10

Ascending in Synergy is the second studio album by German symphonic metal band Elvellon, released on 17 May 2024 via Napalm Records.

== Track listing ==
1. "Unbound" – 5:51
2. "A Vagabond's Heart" – 5:21
3. "My Forever Endeavour" – 5:08
4. "Ocean of Treason" – 5:00
5. "The Aftermath of Life" – 5:14
6. "Last of Our Kind" – 5:57
7. "Into the Vortex" – 6:00
8. "A Legacy Divine" – 4:28
9. "The Aeon Tree" – 9:29
10. "Epiphany of Mine" – 4:18

== Personnel ==
- Nele Messerschmidt – vocals
- Pascal Pannen – keyboards
- Gilbert Gelsdorf – guitars
- Jan Runkel – bass
- Martin Klüners – drums
