= Until Dawn (album) =

Studio album by Elvellon
- Released: 1 June 2018
- Recorded: January–December 2017
- Studio: Toolhouse Studios (Rotenburg an der Fulda, Germany), LeFink Studio (Duisburg, Germany)
- Genre: Symphonic metal
- Length: 60:51
- Label: Reaper Entertainment
- Producer: Gilbert Gelsdorf, Beray Habip

Elvellon chronology
Until Dawn (2018)	Ascending in Synergy (2024)

Professional ratings
Review scores
Source	Rating
Dead Rhetoric	6.5/10
Metal.de	8/10
Powermetal.de	8.5/10
Stormbringer	4.5/5

Until Dawn is the debut studio album by German symphonic metal band Elvellon, released on 1 June 2018 via Reaper Entertainment.

== Track listing ==
1. "Spellbound" – 4:04
2. "Oraculum" – 4:29
3. "Silence from the Deep" – 4:40
4. "The Puppeteer" – 4:39
5. "Fallen into a Dream" – 7:35
6. "Of Winds and Sand" (instrumental) – 1:51
7. "King of Thieves" – 4:57
8. "Until Dawn" – 6:09
9. "Dead-End Alley" – 4:39
10. "Shore to Aeon" – 8:53
11. "Born from Hope" – 4:29
12. "Dreamcatcher" – 4:26

== Personnel ==
- Nele Messerschmidt – vocals
- Gilbert Gelsdorf – guitars
- Phil Kohout – bass
- Pascal Pannen – keyboards
- Martin Klüners – drums
