= All (Colour Haze album) =

Studio album by Colour Haze
- Released: 2008
- Recorded: December 2007–March 2008
- Studios: Ara Tonstudio, Munich, Germany; Institut For Wohlklangforschung, Hannover, Germany; Musikzentrum, Hannover, Germany
- Genres: Stoner rock Psychedelic rock
- Length: 65:14
- Label: Elektrohasch Schallplatten

Colour Haze chronology
Tempel (2006)	All (2008)	She Said (2012)

All is the ninth full-length album by the German stoner rock band Colour Haze. The album was released in 2008 by Elektrohasch Schallplatten.

== Reception ==
Norway's Scream Magazine gave a 5 out of 6 score to All, calling it a "demonstration of might", with its "excesses" and loosening of all inhibitions. Locating All in a record store would be "finding gold". Powermetal.de's reviewer found All captivating, both in its songwriting and soundscape, so as to make the listener lose "track of when one track ended and the next began". Ox-Fanzine also wrote a positive review, though noting that "All shouldn't be listened to casually; it's an album you should take your time with".

Vampster found "psychedelic journeys with countless intricate flourishes and wild, progressive whims, jazzy abstract elements that will delight any 70s psychedelic/krautrock fan, and precisely crafted arrangements for the mind's eye". Still, Colour Haze did not overwhelmingly drift into hippie territory, owing to their "subtle nonchalance" and "laid-back coolness".

Metal.de were more reserved, scoring the album 6 out of 10. The album had a "limited rock potential" and was not recommended for "those who prefer raw, unpolished US stoner rock".

== Track listing ==
1. "Silent" – 7:22
2. "Moon" – 4:56
3. "Turns" – 4:07
4. "Lights" – 8:25
5. "If" – 3:30
6. "Stars" – 3:23
7. "All" – 14:49
8. "Fall" – 9:55
9. "One" – 4:38
10. "Remains" – 4:09

== Personnel ==
- Stefan Koglek − vocals, guitar
- Philipp Rasthoffer − bass guitar
- Manfred Merwald − drums

Guest musicians

- Daniela Heiser – vocals (tracks 6, 8 and 9)
- Christian Hawellek – Hammond B3, mellotron, grand piano (tracks 4, 5, 7 and 8)
- Mario Oberpucher – sitar (track 6 and 9)
