= Chopping Machine =

Studio album by Colour Haze
- Released: 1995
- Recorded: January 30 – February 3, 1995
- Studio: Mystery Music Prod. Munich
- Genre: Stoner rock, psychedelic rock
- Length: 60:06

Colour Haze chronology
Chopping Machine (1995)	Seven (1998)

Chopping Machine is the debut album by the stoner rock band Colour Haze, released in 1995. It was recorded January 30 – February 3, 1995, and mixed in July 1995 in Munich.

The album received a rating of 8 out of 12 from Visions.de. Ox-Fanzine criticized the overall package and booklet, whereas the music was "actually really good. Technically flawless, dense noise attacks full of clean breaks".

== Track listing ==
All tracks are written by Stefan Koglek, except where noted.

No.	Title	Lyrics	Music	Length
1.	"Subversive"			14:24
2.	"Why Don't You"			5:50
3.	"Mud"			6:38
4.	"Chosen Way"	Christian Wiesner, Koglek	Koglek, Tim Höfer	5:24
5.	"Dirt"			8:57
6.	"God's Eyes"	Koglek	Wiesner	8:31
7.	"Sometimes"	Koglek	Koglek, Höfer	4:15
8.	"Chopping Machine"			6:10
Total length:				60:06

== Personnel ==
Colour Haze

- Stefan Koglek – guitar, vocals, violin arrangement on "Subversive"
- Christian Wiesner – bass, didjeridoo, lead vocals on "Chosen Way"
- Tim Höfer – percussion
- Marco Naumann – live sound

Additional

- Willi Haas – violins and violin arrangement on "Subversive"
- Chris Void – engineering
