= Periscope (album) =

Studio album by Colour Haze
- Released: 1999
- Recorded: October 1999; December 1999 ("Transmitter"); October 2001 (re-recording)
- Studio: Colour Haze rehearsal space, Munich
- Genre: Stoner rock, psychedelic rock
- Length: 53:47
- Label: Toaster/Elektrohasch
- Producer: Stefan Koglek

Colour Haze chronology
Seven (1997)	Periscope (1999)	CO2 (2000)

Periscope is the third studio album by the stoner rock/psychedelic rock band Colour Haze, released in 1999. Periscope was re-released in 2005 on the label Elektrohasch, which featured a new version of "Pulse" and all vocals re-recorded in October 2001, plus the bonus track "Transmitter" (recorded December 1999), not included on the original release. This is the version available on all digital platforms.

== Track listing ==
All music by Colour Haze, with lyrics by Stefan Koglek.

1. "Always Me" – 5:58
2. "Antenna" – 9:21
3. "Pulse" – 5:07
4. "Sun" – 8.43
5. "Periscope" – 6:15
6. "Periscope (Breit Return)" – 6:20
7. "Transmitter" (reissue bonus track) – 12:03

== Personnel ==
Colour Haze

- Stefan Koglek – guitar & vocals
- Philipp Rasthofer – bass
- Manfred Merwald – drums

Additional

- Tim Höfer – engineer, drums on "Transmission"
- Martin Szoyra – cover art
- Dirk Martens – inlay collage
