= Elvellon =

German symphonic metal band

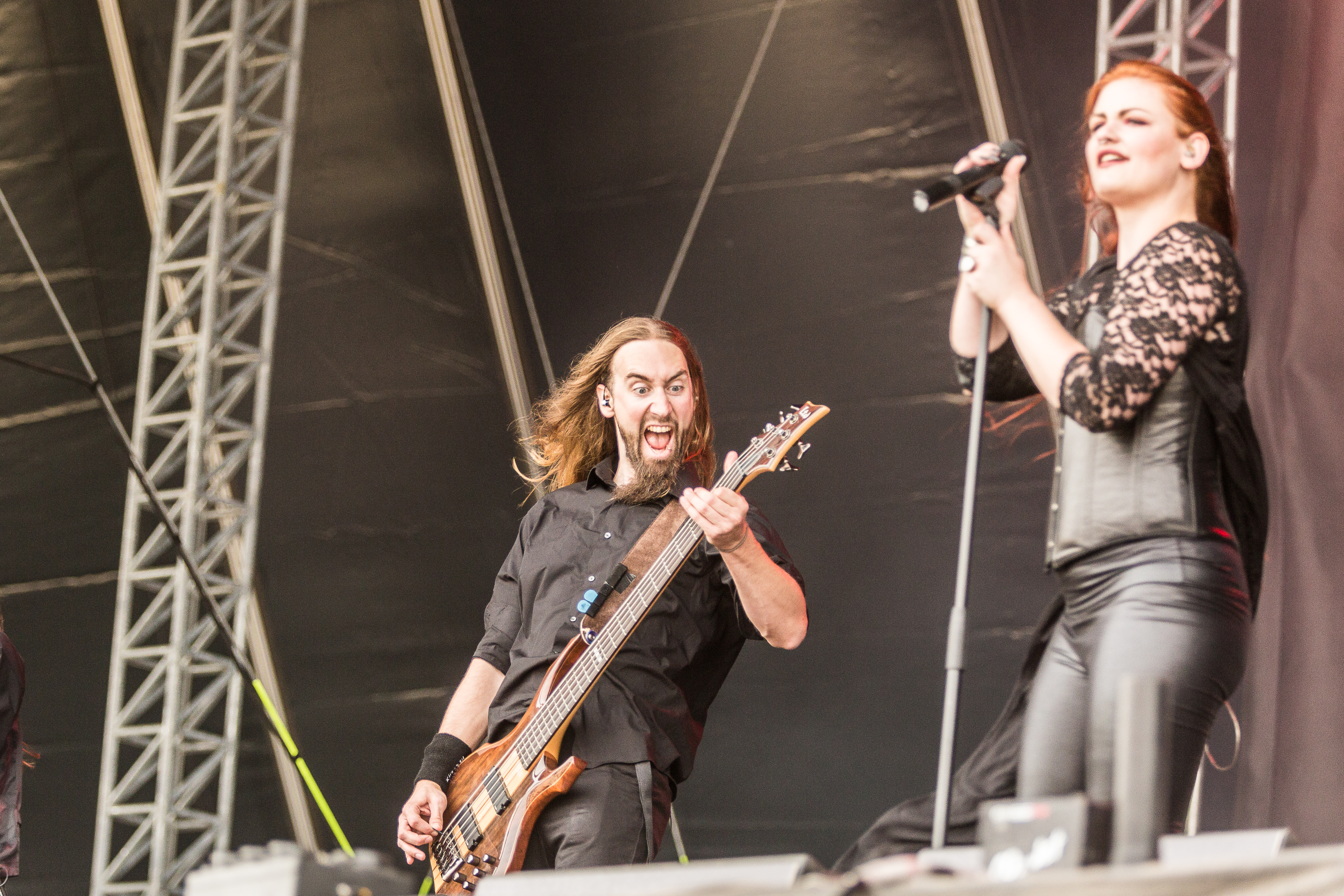
- Elvellon in 2019

Background information
- Origin: Moers, Germany
- Genre: Symphonic metal
- Years active: 2010–present
- Labels: Reaper Entertainment; Napalm Records
- Members: Pascal Pannen; Nele Messerschmidt; Gilbert Gelsdorf; Jan Runkel
- Past members: Phil Kohout; Martin Klüners

Elvellon (Sindarin for "elf-friend") is a German symphonic metal band from Moers, in the Lower Rhine region. Since their formation, they have released one EP, one live DVD and two albums. They have been signed to the music label Napalm Records since 2020.

== History ==
Elvellon was founded in 2010 by Nele Messerschmidt, Martin Klüners and Pascal Pannen. During an initial phase of discovery, Gilbert Gelsdorf joined the band in 2012 and Phil Kohout in 2013. Both had previously played together in Ravian, a symphonic power metal band with whom Elvellon shared the first rehearsal room. In 2015, the self-produced EP Spellbound was released. The music video for the song "Born from Hope" reached almost a million views on YouTube within the first year after its release.

At the beginning of 2018, the band signed a record deal with the label Reaper Entertainment. In June of the same year, the debut album Until Dawn was released. Reviews in magazines such as Metal.de, Metal Hammer and stormbringer.at were very positive and predicted that the band had "a great future", attesting to the album's independence and catchy qualities, as well as ambitious guitar playing and orchestral arrangements that were perfectly matched to it. After a tour as the opening act for Visions of Atlantis and appearances at major open-air festivals (including Rockharz Open Air and Rockfest Barcelona) in 2019, the band signed a contract with Napalm Records. A live DVD was also released independently in 2019.

The band released their second album Ascending in Synergy in May 2024. Three music videos, "A Vagabond's Heart", "My Forever Endeavour", and "The Aftermath of Life", were released beforehand. Critics called the album "outstanding symphonic metal", among other things, and "a really strong record". In June 2024, the German Metal Hammer magazine announced that Elvellon were among the nominees in the Rising Star category of the Metal Hammer Awards 2024.

== Discography ==
Year	Title Music label	Type
2015	Spellbound	EP (5 Tracks)
2018	Until Dawn Reaper Entertainment	Studio album
2020	Until Dawn Live	DVD, concert recording
2024	Ascending in Synergy Napalm Records	Studio album
