= Kobong (band) =

Polish metal band

Background information
- Origin: Warsaw, Poland
- Genres: Experimental metal
- Years active: 1994–1998
- Labels: Polygram, Metal Mind Productions
- Members: Bogdan Kondracki; Robert Sadowski; Wojciech Szymański; Maciej Miechowicz

Kobong was a Polish experimental metal band active in Warsaw from 1994 to 1998.

== History ==
The band was formed in Warsaw in 1994. Having recorded two studio albums, a self-titled debut album in 1995 and "Chmury nie było" in 1997, one of their songs was placed on the Polish soundtrack for the movie "Trainspotting". Kobong also performed during the premiere of Trainspotting in Poland (Kraków, Legnica, Warszawa, Poznań, Sopot). After the breakdown of Kobong, the musicians took up other musical projects, playing in bands such as Nyia and Samo. Bogdan Kondracki, the band's vocalist, is currently recognized as a musical producer, producing albums for artists like Monika Brodka and Ania Dąbrowska. In 2001, three original Kobong members (without Sadowski) formed the band Neuma. On 26 January 2005, Robert Sadowski died from a heart attack.

== Musical style ==
Kobong's music was impulsive and original played with a highly experimental approach. The band was described as the precursor of "hard playing" in Poland, and stated that their music was influenced by bands such as Meshuggah.

== Discography ==
- 1995: Kobong
- 1997: Chmury nie było

== Band members ==
- Bogdan Kondracki – vocals, bass
- Robert Sadowski – guitar
- Wojciech Szymański – drums
- Maciej Miechowicz – guitar
