= Burden of Grief =

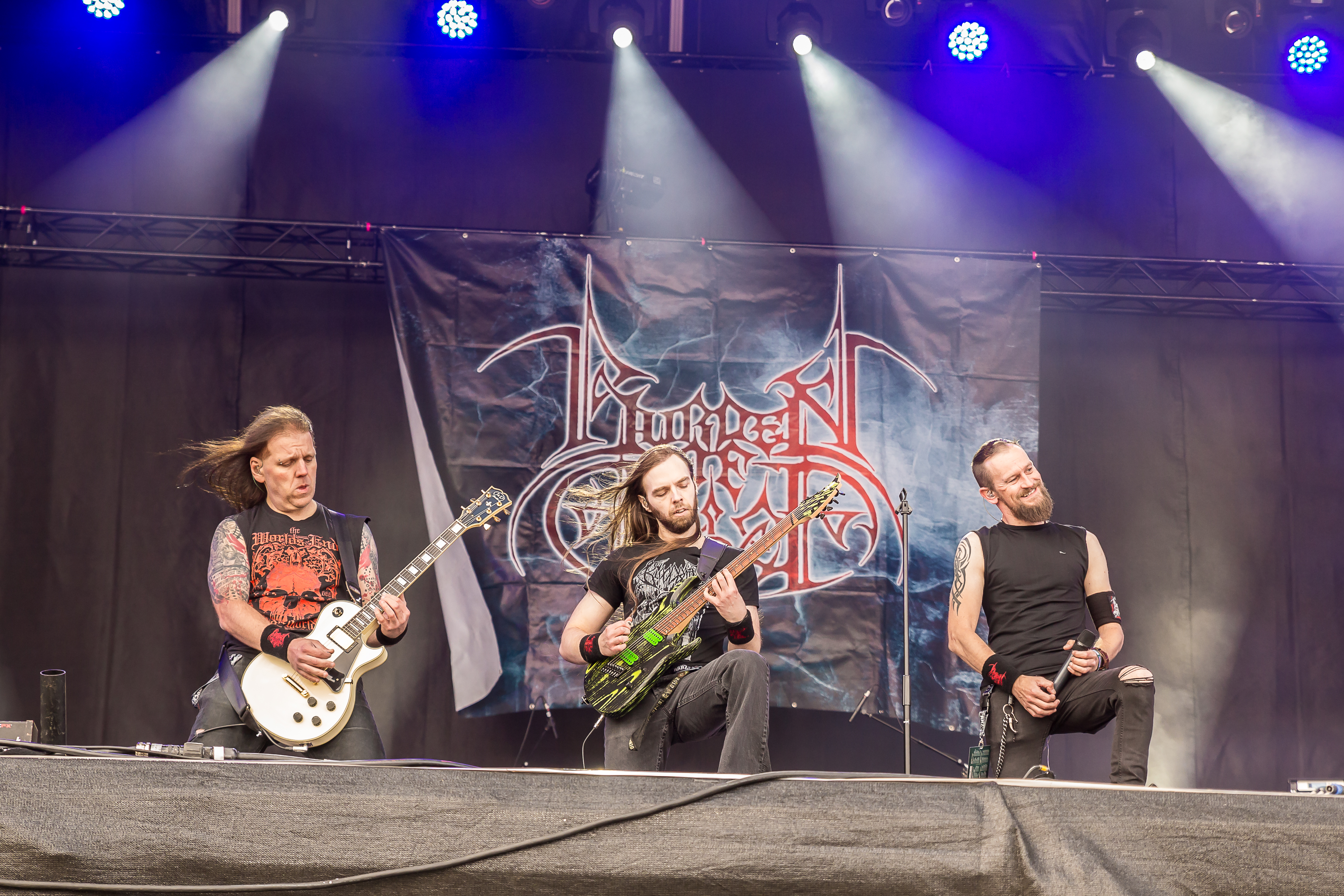
- Burden of Grief at Rockharz Open Air 2022

Background information
- Origin: Germany
- Genres: Melodic death metal
- Years active: 1994–present
- Labels: Massacre Records
- Website: www.burdenofgrief.com

Burden of Grief is a melodic death metal band that was formed in late summer of 1994. The original line-up consisted of the singer Mike Huhmann, drummer Christoph Schellöh and the two guitar-players Oliver Eikenberg and Philipp Hanfland. Bass-player Ulrich Busch joined the band several months later. Together with him the band recorded their first demo-tape "A Duet Of Thoughts" in spring ‘96.

With a first musical sign of life, Burden of Grief entered the stages of the underground-clubs for the first time. Spurred on by the positive reactions so far, the band decided to enter the Stage One Studio to record their next album together with producer Andy Classen. As a result 5 songs came out which had been released as the "Above Twilight Wings"-MCD. The reactions and reviews to this CD were absolutely great. Even the metal magazine Rock Hard recognized the huge development of Burden of Grief's music and selected the band for their newcomer compilation CD "Unerhört-the best of the unsigned acts".

The band played one gig after another and developed to become an impressing live act. Nearly two years after the release of their debut-MCD, Burden of Grief entered the studio again (this time the Ofen-studio in Kassel) to record their next album together with producer Carsten Schmerer who joined the band some months later as their drummer. Besides four new songs and the re-recorded demo-song, the CD should contain the old Iron Maiden classic "Prowler".

== Discography ==
2000 – Haunting Requiems

2001 – On Darker Trails

2004 – Fields of Salvation

2007 – Death End Road

2010 – Follow The Flames

2014 – Unchained

2018 – Eye of the Storm

2023 – Destination Dystopia

== Line-up ==
=== Current members ===
- Mike − vocals
- Philipp − guitars
- Joe − guitars
- Florian − bass guitar
- Robb − drums
Burden of Grief, current lineup live at Rockharz Open Air 2022

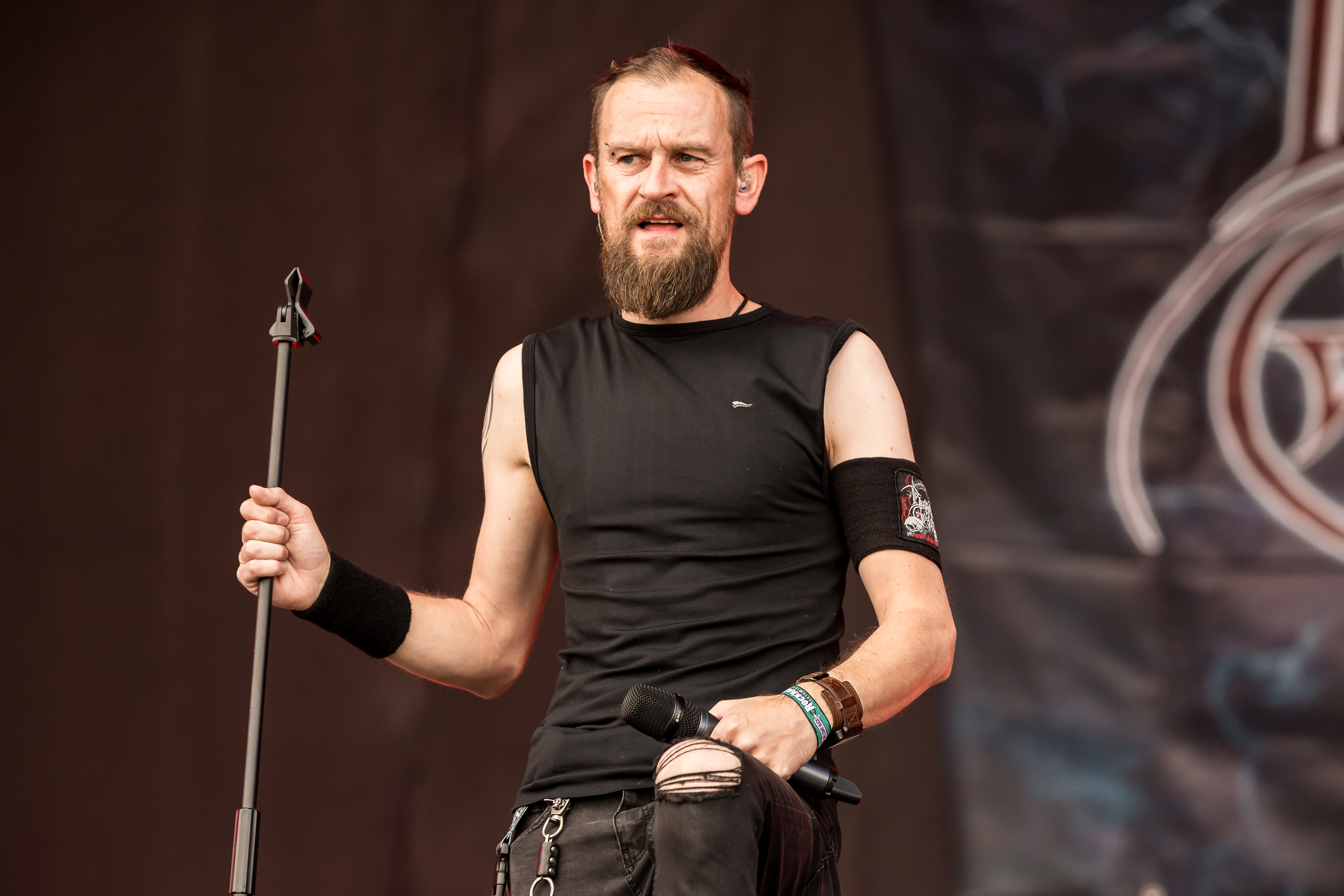
Singer Mike Huhmann

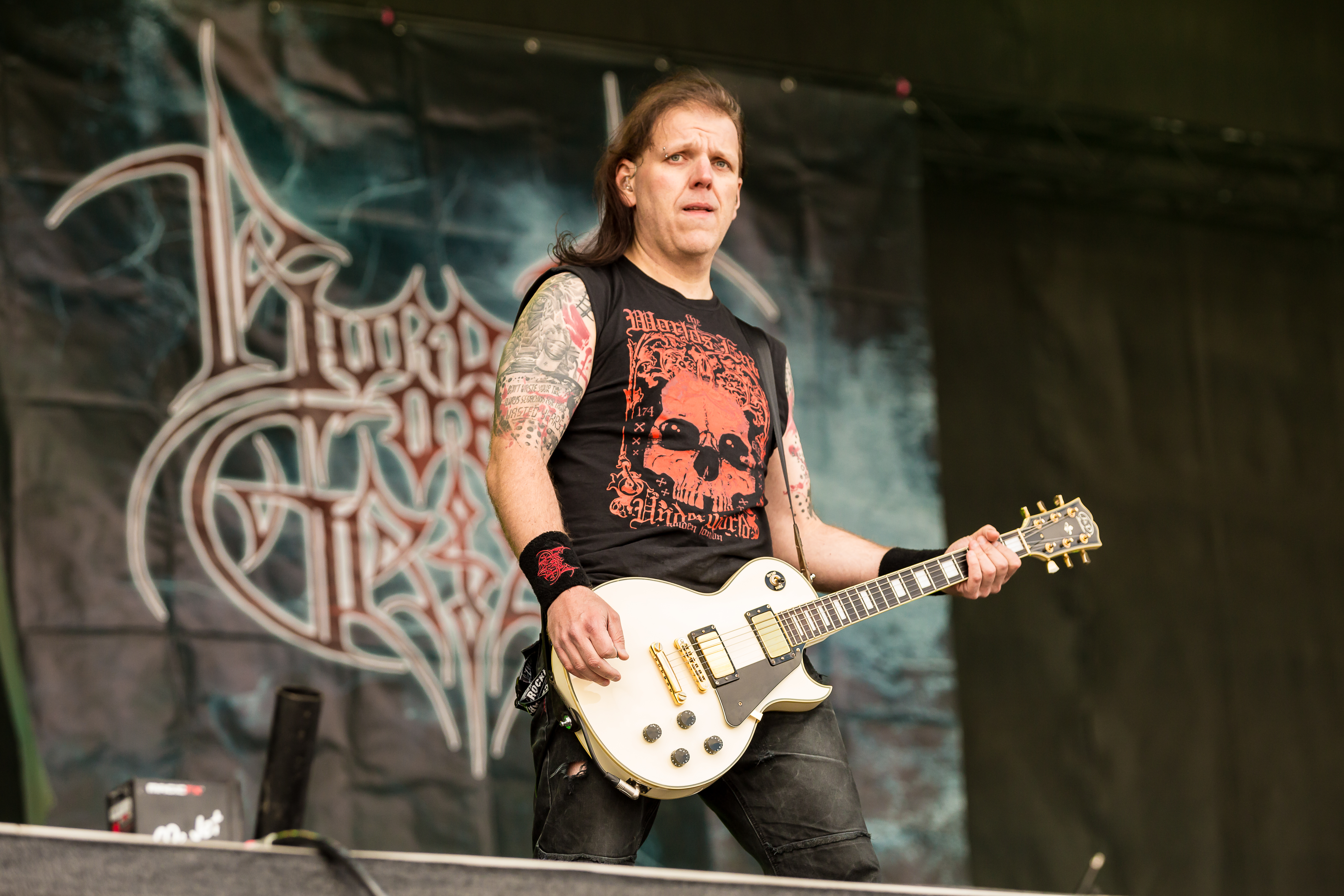
Guitarist Philipp Hanfland

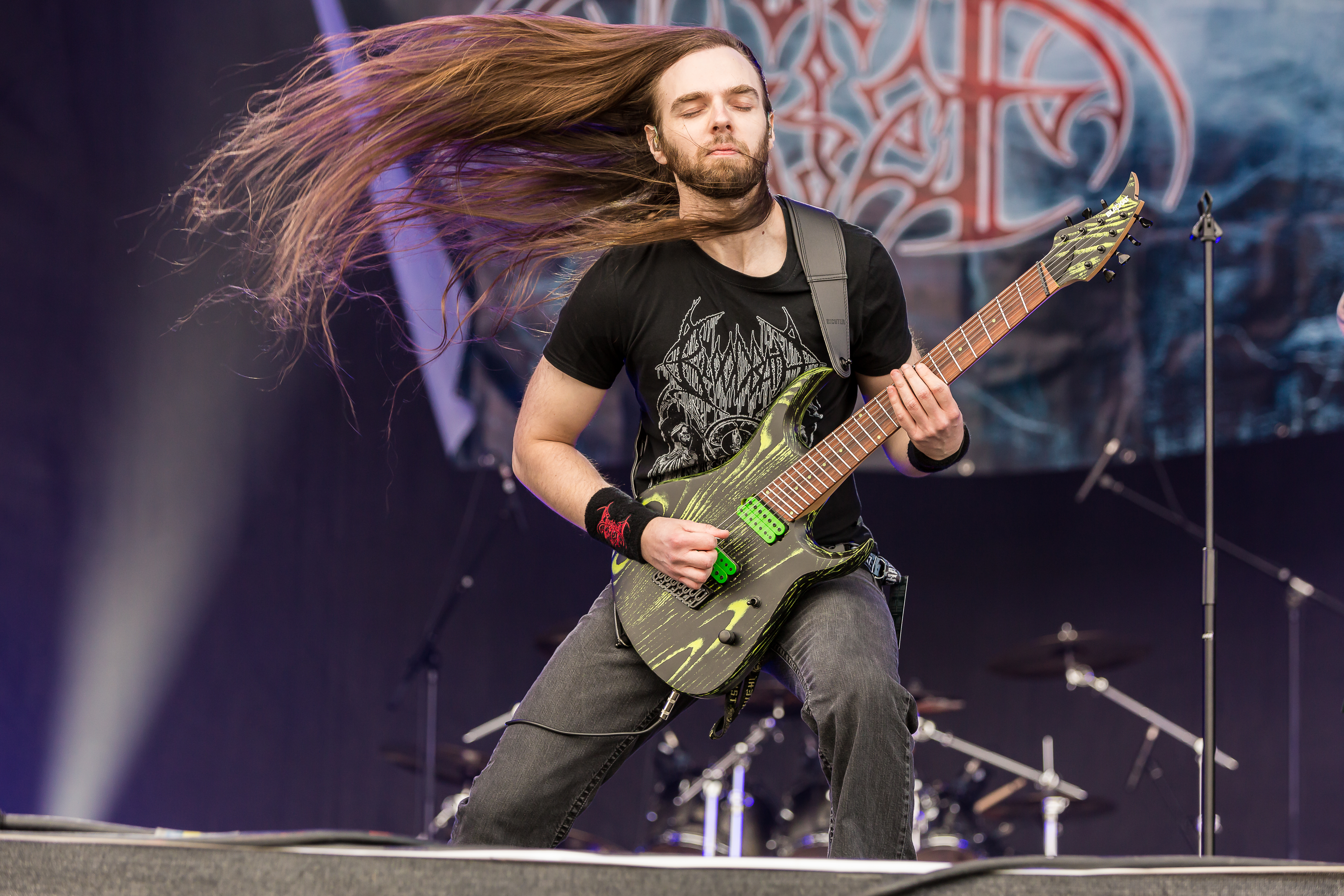
Guitarist Dominik Hellmuth

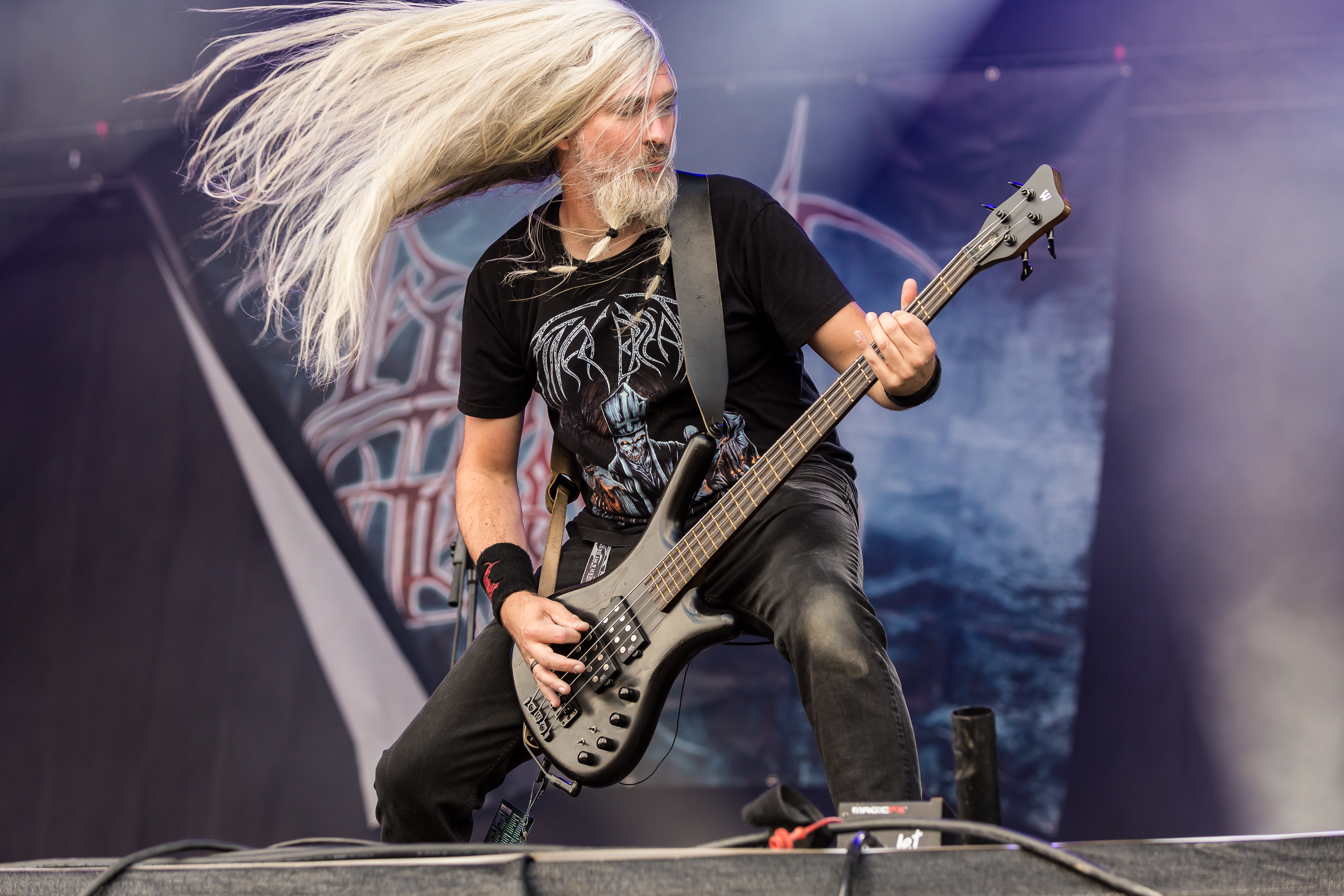
Bassist Florian Bauer

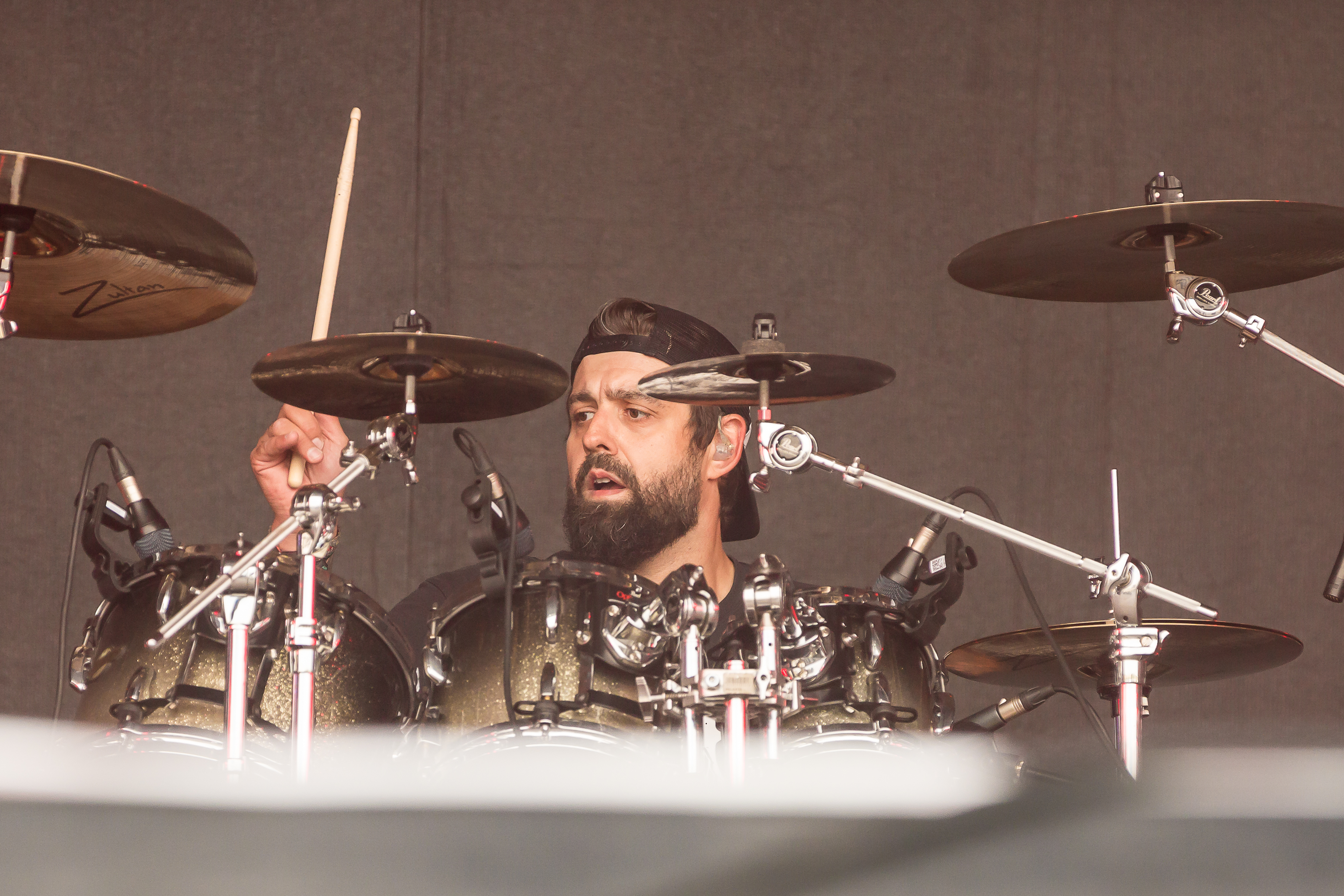
Drummer Manuel Lüke
