= Craft (band) =

Swedish black metal band

- Origin: Dalecarlia, Sweden
- Genre: Black metal
- Years active: 1994–present
- Labels: Carnal Records; Southern Lord Records; Napalm Records; Season of Mist

Craft is a Swedish black metal band, formed as "Nocta" in 1994. Nocta recorded an unreleased demo in 1997 and changed their name to "Craft". They are inspired by early black metal acts such as Burzum and Darkthrone, and heavy metal bands such as Black Sabbath and Celtic Frost. Their lyrics focus on misanthropy, destruction, hate, Anti-Cosmic Satanism, and death, resembling early lyrics by melodic black/death metal band Dissection. After drummer Daniel Halén quit the band in 2005, the remaining members considered putting the band on hold, but continued, addressing his replacement later. In 2008, Dirge Rep (Gehenna, ex-Gorgoroth, ex-Enslaved) joined the band to play session drums for an album released in August 2011. They released their fifth album, White Noise and Black Metal, on 22 June 2018.

== Members ==
Current

- Markus – vocals (2025-present)
- Joakim Karlsson – guitar, lyrics (1998-present) bass (2000, 2002)
- Alex Purkis – bass (2010-present)
- Pär Johansson - drums (2022-present)
- Tobias Jansson - lead guitar (2023-present)

Former

- Mikael Nox - vocals (2000-2024)
- John Doe – guitar (1997-2017) bass (2005)
- Daniel Halén – drums (1994–2005)
- Björn Petterson – Session vocals on Total Soul Rape
- Mannevond – vocals (2024-2025)

Guests

- Björn, Kaos131 and Shamaatae – "additional noise and creative madness" on Fuck the Universe
- D. Moilanen - drums on "White Noise and Black Metal"

== Discography ==
Studio albums

- Total Soul Rape (2000)
- Terror Propaganda: Second Black Metal Attack (2002)
- Fuck the Universe (2005)
- Void (2011)
- White Noise and Black Metal (2018)

Demos

- Total Eclipse (1999)

== Sources ==
- Interview (2002) with Thomas Legros on Voices from the Darkside
- Interview (2006) on Ferrum
- Eduardo Rivadavia. "Craft | Biography & History". AllMusic.
