= Damn the Machine =

American progressive metal band

- Damn the Machine in 1993

Background information
- Origin: United States
- Genre: Progressive metal
- Years active: 1991–1996
- Labels: Village Slut, A&M
- Past members: Chris Poland; Mark Poland; David Randi; David Judson Clemmons
- Website: damnthemachine.com

Damn the Machine was an American progressive metal band founded by ex-Megadeth guitarist Chris Poland and David Judson Clemmons, and is considered to be a vital pioneer in the genre of progressive rock and metal.

Known for their debut self-titled album, including lyrically relevant subjects and a unique blend of musical styles. Since their creation in 1991, and disbanding in 1994, the band has remained dormant. In recent news, the band released Day One in October 2021, which consists of the 12 original tracks as demo versions, before they were eventually re-recorded by producer Brian Malouf for their debut album. Day One is a look inside the band, before their signing to major label A&M Records in 1993.

== History ==
After leaving Megadeth in 1987, guitarist Chris Poland recorded a solo album, Return to Metalopolis, in 1990. Three years later, he resurfaced with the group Damn the Machine (DTM), which included his brother Mark on drums, David Judson Clemmons on vocals/guitar, and David Randi on bass. While the group were indeed heavy, their sound was slightly more progressive than Poland's previous band and solo work, perhaps more comparable to the likes of Queensrÿche or Fates Warning, though with a jazzier twist and more politically charged lyrics.

The band signed a deal with A&M Records in 1993, and their self-titled debut album was released the same year. The album was recorded and produced by Brian Malouf (known for his work with, among others, Pearl Jam, Queen, Extreme, Madonna, Michael Jackson, Lisa Loeb and Jean-Luc Ponty). The band toured with Dream Theater in Europe, and toured in North America with Voivod, Flotsam and Jetsam, and Excel. The band also shot a music video for "The Mission" from their debut album. DTM also released a promotional CD-5 titled Silence, which featured covers of "I'd Love to Change the World" by Ten Years After, and King Crimson's "Cat Food".

Prior to recording the album, the band had cut an 18-song live in-studio demo, which included a half dozen songs that did not make the album, namely "Fear of Fear", "Welcome the Red", "New World Revival", "The Price", "Legend Maker", and "Heavens Gate". Another six songs – "No Rest", "Blinder Than I", "Wall", "Brains", "Bleed" and "Decay" – were demoed in 1995 prior to Clemmons leaving the band.

== Aftermath ==
DTM was not widely embraced by the alternative-minded consumer, and received less and less support from A&M. Their recording contract was canceled, which led to the band's premature demise soon thereafter. Dave Clemmons departed the group, and with a new singer the remaining members reformed as Mumbo's Brain (the latter of which can be heard on Chris Poland's solo release – Rare Trax from 2000).

Dave Clemmons later resurfaced with a band named Jud (and later formed The Fullbliss and released several solo albums), while Chris Poland went on to form the jazz-fusion trio OHM, with whom he released one live and two studio albums. Mark Poland has a musical project of his own, and Dave Randi now works for Playboy Plus Entertainment.

== Discography ==
=== Albums ===
- Damn the Machine (1993)
- Day One (2021)
- The Last Man (2022)

=== Promotional singles ===
- "Silence" (1993)
- "Lonesome God" (1993)
- "The Mission" (1993)
