= Forgotten Silence =

Czech metal band

- Origin: Brno, Czech Republic
- Genres: Death metal; progressive metal
- Years active: 1993–present
- Labels: Redblack; Obscene; Epidemie
- Website: forgottensilence.cz

Forgotten Silence is a Czech experimental metal band founded in Brno in 1993. Their earlier work can be described as death metal with some progressive/art rock leanings. Their 2006 release, Kro Ni Ka has a much more experimental sound to it, with very few traces of their earlier heavy sound.

== Discography ==
=== Studio albums ===
- Thots (1995)
- Senyaan (1998)
- Ka Ba Ach (2000)
- Kro Ni Ka (2006)
- La Grande Bouffe (2012)
- Kras (2018)
- Vemork Konstrukt (2023)
- Idola Specus (2026)

=== EPs, demos, live ===
- The Nameless Forever... The Last Remembrance (demo, 1994)
- Clara split with Dissolving of Prodigy (EP, 1996)
- The Hills of Senyaan pt.II split with Agony (EP, 1997)
- Hathor's Place split with Notre Dame (EP, 1999)
- Yarim Ay (EP, 2002)
- Bya Bamahe Neem (EP, 2004)
- Tumulus split with Chiasmatic (EP, 2008)
- Sonique Voyeurisme (live, 2015)
