= Senser =

British rap rock band

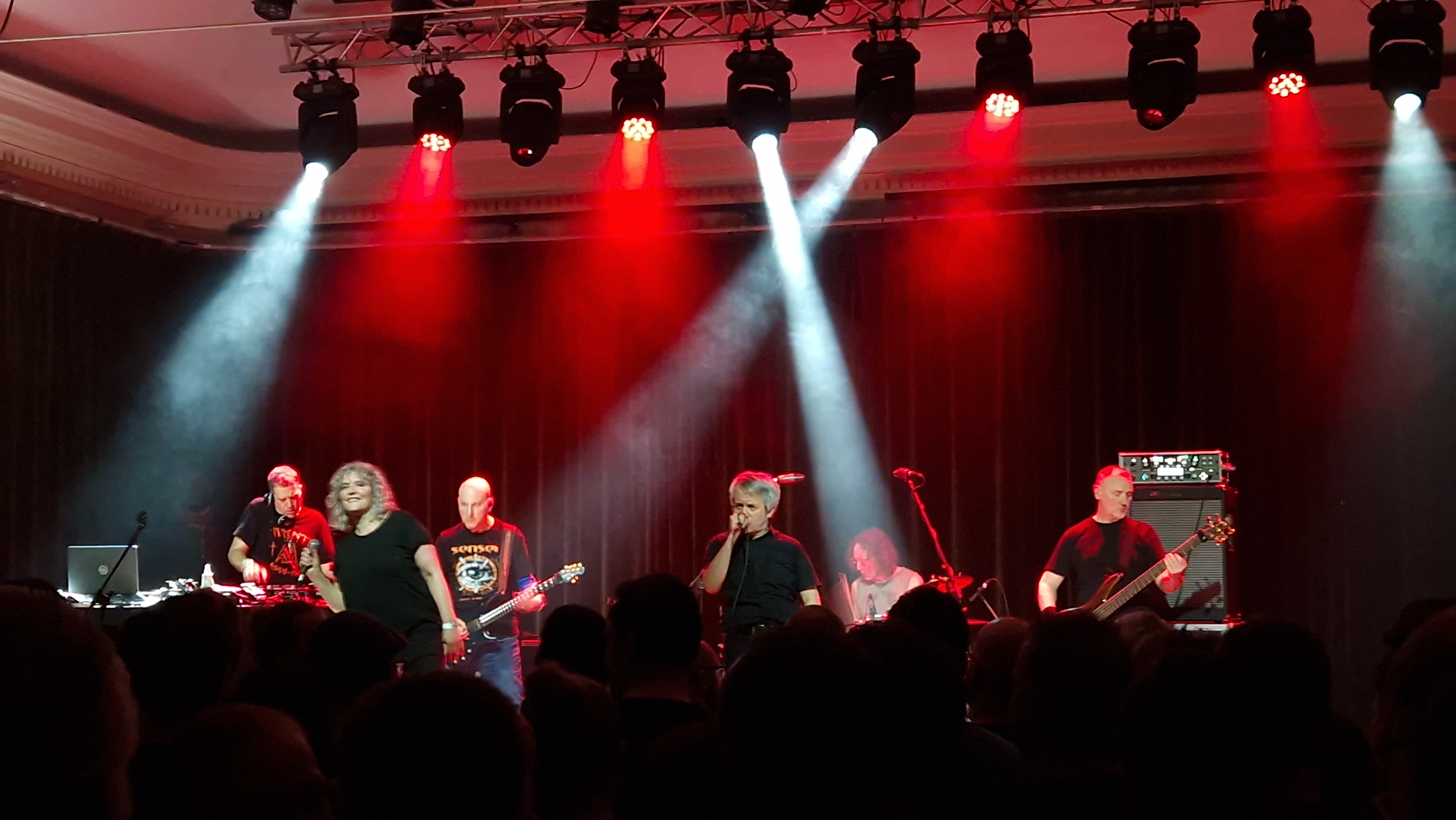
- Senser performing in Belgium in 2026

Background information
- Origin: London, England
- Genres: Rap rock; rapcore; alternative rock; rap metal; nu metal
- Years active: 1991–1999, 2003–present
- Labels: Ultimate, A&M, One Little Indian, Imprint Music
- Members: Heitham Al-Sayed; Kerstin Haigh; Nick Michaelson; James Barrett; John Morgan; Alan "Deckwrecka" Gold
- Past members: Erika Footman; Paul Soden; Alan Haggarty; Steve Morton; Andy Clinton
- Website: senser.co.uk

Senser are an English rap rock band, originally formed in South West London.

== History ==
Senser were formed in 1989 in South West London.

In 1992, they were joined by Spiral Tribe D.J, Andy Clinton. The band toured in support of psychedelic rockers the Ozric Tentacles in 1992. In 1993, the band were signed to Ultimate Records.

In 1993, Senser released two indie singles on Ultimate – "Eject" and "The Key". The latter would appear on NME Singles of the Week 1993 album.

In March 1994, Senser released their third single, "Switch", which entered the UK Singles Chart at number 39. Senser's first album, Stacked Up, was released in May 1994, and entered the UK Albums Chart at number 4.

At the beginning of 1995, Senser toured the UK supported by Skunk Anansie before setting off to tour the United States with Moby. It was during this tour that the band decided to split over musical differences. Al-Sayed and Morgan left to form a new band with Haggis called Lodestar. The remaining members of Senser found a new drummer, Paul Soden, and set about writing Senser's second album.

In the summer of 1998, Haigh was able to tour and the band released the second album, Asylum. Once again musical differences became apparent and by February 1999 the band decided to split.

In 2003, the original line-up reunited originally to perform for one show, but decided to re-form and record again. They released their third studio album SCHEMAtic in 2004.

In 2009, they released How to Do Battle.

In 2013, they released their fifth album To the Capsules via Pledgemusic and toured with Erika Footman on vocals in place of Kerstin Haigh.

In 2014, to celebrate the 20th anniversary of their debut Stacked Up, the band re-released the album in expanded edition with a remastered version of the original tracks on the first CD, and bonus tracks from the era (remixes and previously unreleased songs) on the second disc.

In June 2020, during the COVID-19 pandemic, the band uploaded a cover of The Who's "Baba O'Riley" on their YouTube channel.

The band released "Ryot Pump", their first song since 2013 in August 2025, followed by the album Sonic Dissidence in October of that year.

== Discography ==
=== Albums ===
- Stacked Up (1994) Ultimate/A&M Records
- Asylum (1998) Ultimate
- Asylum (Limited Edition) (1998) Senser Vs. De:Senser
- Parallel Charge (2001) Strike Back
- SCHEMAtic (2004) One Little Indian
- How to Do Battle (2009) Imprint
- To the Capsules (2013)
- Sonic Dissidence (2025)

=== EPs and singles ===
- "Eject" (1993), Ultimate
- "The Key" (1993), Ultimate
- "Switch" (1994), Ultimate
- "Age of Panic" (1994), Ultimate
- "Charming Demons" (1996), Ultimate
- "Adrenalin" (1998), Ultimate
- "Breed" (1998), Ultimate
- "Weatherman", (1998) Ultimate (promo only)
- De:Senser EP (1998), Ultimate
- "The Brunt" (2004), One Little Indian
- "Bulletproof" / "Crucible" (2004), One Little Indian
- "Resistance Now" (2009), Imprint
- Biting Rhymes EP (2011), Imprint – features hiphop covers

=== Videos/DVDs ===
- States of Mind (1995), Ultimate (VHS)
- Live at the Underworld (2006), Ignite (DVD/CD)

== Members ==
=== Current ===
- Heitham Al-Sayed – vocals, percussion (1991–1995, 1999, 2003–present)
- Kerstin Haigh – vocals, flute (1991–1999, 2003–2011, 2015–present)
- James Barrett – bass (1991–1999, 2003–present)
- Nick Michaelson – guitar (1991–1999, 2003–present)
- John Morgan – drums (1991–1995, 1999, 2003–present)
- Alan "Deckwrecka" Gold – turntables (2024–present)

=== Former ===
- Steve Morton – drums (1991–1992)
- Alan "Hagos/Haggis" Haggarty – sound engineering, programming, producer (1992–1994, 1999, 2003–2004)
- Paul Soden – drums (1995–1999)
- Erika Footman – vocals (2011–2015)
- Andy "Awe" Clinton – turntables (1992–1999, 2003–2017)
