= Stacked Up =

Studio album by Senser
- Released: 2 May 1994
- Genres: Rap rock, thrash metal
- Label: Ultimate
- Producer: Haggis

Senser chronology
Stacked Up (1994)	Asylum (1998)

Stacked Up is the debut album by UK rap-rock band Senser. It was released in the UK on 2 May 1994 and entered the national charts at No.4.

== Background ==
Senser was formed in the late eighties, originally with Kerstin Haigh on lead vocals and, from 1991, Heitham Al-Sayed as the drummer. Al-Sayed moved onto vocal duties when the band covered Public Enemy's "She Watch Channel Zero?!", from It Takes a Nation of Millions to Hold Us Back.

The band's first two singles, "The Key", released in September 1993, and "Switch", released in March 1994, made the UK Singles Chart Top 50, and garnered rave reviews from both dance and indie reviewers.

The political background in Britain, and the impending passing of the Criminal Justice Act into statute paved the way for a series of politically influenced artists such as the Levellers, the Prodigy, Dreadzone, and Pop Will Eat Itself, and Senser fit into that group with a blend of aggressive hip-hop, thrash metal and psychedelic ambience.

Buoyed by the success of their singles and live performances, Senser released Stacked Up on 2 May 1994.

== Critical reception ==
Professional ratings
Review scores
Source	Rating
AllMusic	3/5 stars

The Guardian wrote that the album "is an aggressive, schizophrenic beast, ranging from the lazy acid dub of 'The Key' to the thrash-metal overdrive of 'Eject'." The Record opined that Senser "weld thrash, metal, and hip-hop into an ungainly, unlikeable contraption."

== Track listing ==
All songs written by Senser unless otherwise indicated

1. "States of Mind" – 5:10
2. "The Key" – 5:22
3. "Switch" – 4:33
4. "Age of Panic" – 4:08
5. "What's Going On" – 5:07
6. "One Touch One Bounce" – 3:24
7. "Stubborn" – 5:46
8. "Door Game" – 6:39
9. "Peanut Head" – 5:40
10. "Peace" (Senser, Tim Morton) – 5:50
11. "Eject" – 5:19
12. "No Comply" – 2:37
13. "Worth" – 3:04

== Personnel ==
- Alan 'Haggis/Hagos' Haggarty — programming, production, mixing
- Heitham Al-Sayed — vocals
- Kerstin Haigh — vocals
- Nick Michaelson — guitar
- James Barrett — bass
- John Morgan — Drums
- Andy "Awe" Clinton — DJ

== Singles ==
Year	Single	Chart	Position
1993	"The Key"	UK Top 40	47
1994	"Switch"	UK Top 40	39
1994	"Age of Panic"	UK Top 40	52

== Chart performance ==
Stacked Up was released in the UK on 2 May 1994. In its first week it entered the UK Album Chart at number 4. It gradually dropped down the charts and was last seen at number 64 on 7 September, a total of five weeks altogether. Stacked Up achieved sales in excess of 400,000 copies.
