= Colour Haze =

German rock band

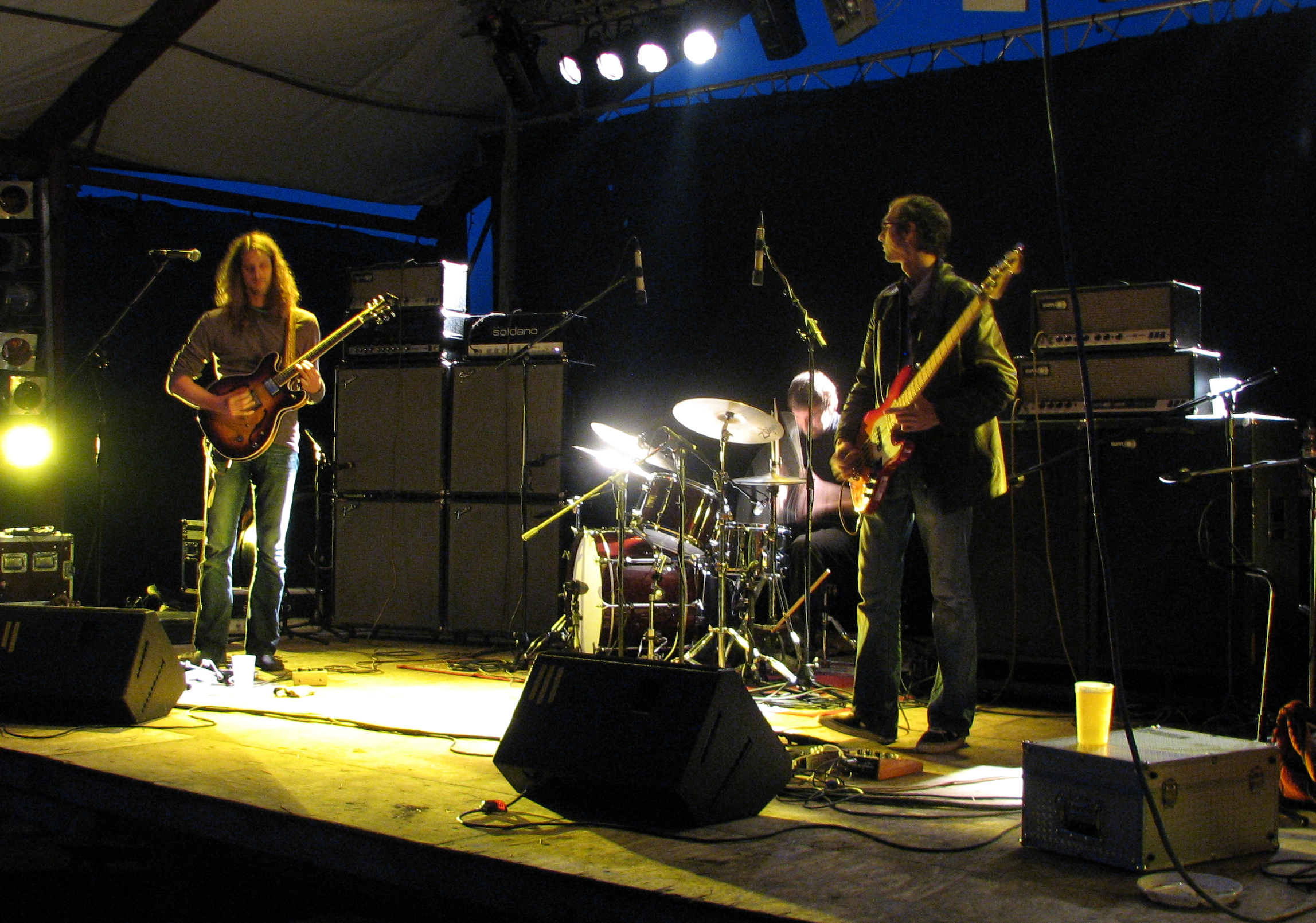
- Colour Haze: Stefan Koglek, Philipp Rasthofer, Manfred Merwald performing live in The Netherlands on 15 August 2008

Background information
- Origin: Munich, Germany
- Genres: Psychedelic rock, progressive rock, space rock
- Years active: 1994–present
- Labels: Elektrohasch Schallplatten; MonsterZeroRecords
- Members: Stefan Koglek; Manfred Merwald; Mario Oberpucher; Jan Faszbender
- Past members: Tim Höfer; Christian Wiesner; Felix Neuenhoff; Philipp Rasthofer
- Website: http://www.colourhaze.de/

Colour Haze is a stoner/psychedelic rock group from Munich, Germany, consisting of singer and guitarist Stefan Koglek, drummer Manfred Merwald, bassist Mario Oberpucher and keyboardist Jan Faszbender.

Formed in the mid-nineties, Colour Haze is one of the oldest German stoner outfits, and have since then become one of the flagships of the German stoner rock scene. Tours of the band have included headline spots at smaller national and international rock festivals, such as Desert Fest, Burg Herzberg Festival or Indie March Festival, Bangalore (India). Local media coverage have included broadcasts of concerts on national television, when Colour Haze appeared at Rockpalast in 2007 and 2019.

Emerging from a sound heavily influenced by Kyuss on their first records, they moved away from a heavy to a more melodic sound, e.g. on their album All (2008), as remarked by Denmark's LowCut webzine.

== Members ==
=== Current Line Up ===
- Stefan Koglek - guitar, vocals
- Manfred Merwald - drums (1998–present)
- Jan Faszbender - keyboards (2018–present)
- Mario Oberpucher - bass guitar (2020–present)

=== Former Members ===
- Tim Höfer - Drums (1994–1997)
- Christian Wiesner - bass guitar (1994–1998)
- Felix Neuenhoff - vocals (1997–1999)
- Philipp Rasthofer - bass guitar (1998–2020)

== Discography ==
=== Studio albums ===
- Chopping Machine CD (1995 David Records)
- Seven CD (1998 "Selfburn" Records)
- Periscope CD (1999 Toaster Records)
- CO2 LP/CD (2000 Homegrown Records/MonsterZeroRecords)
- Ewige Blumenkraft LP/CD (2001 MonsterZeroRecords)
- Los Sounds de Krauts LP/CD (2003 Nasoni Records/Elektrohasch Records)
- Colour Haze LP/CD (2004 Elektrohasch Records)
- Tempel LP/CD (2006 Elektrohasch Records)
- All LP/CD (2008 Elektrohasch Records)
- She Said LP/CD (2012 Elektrohasch Records)
- To the Highest Gods We Know LP/CD (2014 Elektrohasch Records)
- In Her Garden LP/CD (2017 Elektrohasch Records)
- We Are LP/CD (2019 Elektrohasch Records)
- Sacred LP/CD (2022 Elektrohasch Records)

=== Live albums ===
- Burg Herzberg Festival 18. Juli 2008 DCD (2009 Herzbergverlag)
- Live Vol.1 - Europa Tournee 2015 2CD/3LP ltd (2016 Elektrohasch Records)
- Live Vol.2 - Live At Duna Jam 2007 2CD/2LP (2019 Elektrohasch Records)
- Live Vol.3 2020 LP (2022 Elektrohasch Records)

=== Reissue ===
- Periscope LP/CD (2003 Elektrohasch Records)
- 2004 Extended Play LP/CD (2022 Elektrohasch Records)

=== EPs ===
- Colour Haze/Color Cacas Swamp Room Single Club Split 7 inch (2001 Swamp Room Records)
- Colour Haze/Gas Giant Split 7 inch (2004 Elektrohasch Records)
- Colour Haze/Hypnos 69 Split 10 inch (2004 Elektrohasch Records)

=== Video ===
- Live At The Himmelreich 23.03.2002 VHS (2002 Self Released)

=== Compilation appearances ===
- "Pulse" on A Tribute to Mr. Betonohr (2002)
- A cover of Cactus's "One Way...Or Another" on Sucking the 70's - Back in the Saddle Again (2006 Small Stone Records)
- The Psychedelic Avengers and the Curse of the Universe (Fünfundvierzig 2004, 148)
