= David Judson Clemmons =

- Born: David Judson Clemmons
- Genres: Hard rock, progressive metal, singer-songwriter
- Occupations: Musician, songwriter
- Instruments: Guitar, vocals
- Years active: 1988–present
- Labels: A&M Records, Metal Blade Records, Nois-O-Lution, Village Slut Records, 7 People Records
- Website: www.djclemmons.com

David Judson Clemmons is an American guitarist, singer, and songwriter. He is well known for his groundbreaking contributions to the genres of progressive metal and post-rock. He is credited as the founder of the bands Damn the Machine, Jud, The Fullbliss, and Ministers of Anger.

== Career ==
=== Ministers of Anger (1987-1989) ===
Ministers of Anger was a progressive thrash project formed by Clemmons, which included future Machine Head drummer Dave McClain. Both were also involved in the band Murdercar alongside former Detente guitarist Ross Robinson. Between 1988 and 1991, Ministers of Anger recorded three demos, and one of their songs, "The Great Escape," appeared on Metal Blade's Metal Massacre XI compilation. The project eventually ended when Clemmons joined Chris Poland as vocalist and co-guitarist to form the band Damn the Machine. In 2013, East Coast indie label Divebomb Records released a limited-edition 14-song Ministers of Anger demo retrospective titled Renaissance.

=== Damn the Machine (1991-1994) ===
Damn the Machine was a progressive metal band based in Los Angeles. The group was composed of guitarist Chris Poland (ex-Megadeth, OHM:), his brother Mark Poland on drums, David Clemmons on guitars and vocals, and bassist Dave Randi. The quartet released only one self-titled album. Their sound was a jazzier take on metal compared to other progressive metal bands of the time, such as Queensrÿche and Fates Warning, with lyrical content focusing largely on politics and morality.

The group signed with A&M Records in 1993, releasing one album and three singles. Damn the Machine toured Europe with Dream Theater and later embarked on a U.S. tour with Voivod. However, in 1995, poor record sales led A&M Records to drop several bands from their catalog, including Damn the Machine. Although they had been working on material for a second album, the loss of their record deal resulted in the band's dissolution. The remaining members formed a new band called Mumbo's Brain, while David Clemmons departed to start his own project.

=== JUD (1995-) ===
Joining forces with Virginian schoolmates, drummer David Wright (known as Hoss) and bassist Steve Cordrey, the trio formed JUD in Los Angeles in 1995. Relying heavily on bass, down-tuned guitars, and balancing between the brutality of Prong, the grunginess of Nirvana, and elements of spoken word, JUD created a sound uniquely their own. Their debut album, Something Better, produced and partially mixed by Ross Robinson (known for his work with Korn, Slipknot, and Sepultura), was published by Nois-O-Lution in Europe. This led the Los Angeles-based band to a tour of the continent, followed by a tour of the United States the following year.

After their US tour, the three went into the studio to record an acoustic album, Inner Mission, intended as an interlude between their debut and their next full-length release. This album showcased a completely different side of the band compared to their electrically charged debut. In 1998, a slight lineup change resulted in James Schmidt taking over drum duties. That same year, the band's second album, Chasing California, was released, leading to a summer festival tour. JUD entered the studio in late summer 2000, with Hoss Wright rejoining the band, to record what would be their final album with the original lineup. Released in 2001, The Perfect Life featured more polished production than their earlier efforts.

In 2008, Clemmons, along with former JUD drummer James Schmidt and bassist Jan Hampicke (both Fullbliss regulars at the time), reformed JUD to release a brand-new album entitled Sufferboy. The trio wrote and recorded demos of the tracks before sending them to producer Jon Caffery, who, after hearing the demos, agreed to produce the project. The group recorded the album without a record deal before contacting Nois-O-Lution for its release. The album, recorded in analog, was released on August 8, 2008. In an interview at the time, Clemmons called it "the most energetic record I've ever made."

Clemmons and JUD were set to release their newest album on November 17, 2016. The LP, titled Generation Vulture, features a quote on the album artwork that reads: "An album for the living. An album for the dead."

=== The Fullbliss (1997-) ===
Following the release and tour support for The Perfect Life, Clemmons decided to explore other musical projects with different collaborators, effectively ending JUD. Clemmons' new project, a band called The Fullbliss, released their first album, Fools and Their Splendor, in 2001. David was joined by many other musicians, and the album featured a more acoustic and melancholic tone compared to JUD, heavily incorporating violin and viola. In an interview, Clemmons stated that he wanted an outlet for more emotional and dynamic work, exploring the extremes of life and death under one artistic umbrella, which he felt The Fullbliss provided.

Several more albums followed. In 2002, The Fullbliss released their second album, This Temple Is Haunted. Their third album, Yes Sir (also carrying Clemmons' name as a solo artist) was released in 2006 and combined upbeat and melancholy material with a touch of political satire, such as the track "Silicone City." In an interview, Clemmons noted a key difference with this album: several songs were written in his native Virginia rather than Los Angeles. Another compilation, featuring unreleased material, was released by The Fullbliss in 2007 under the title Revolution Songs (1992–2007).

=== David Judson Clemmons the solo artist (2004-) ===
In 2004, Clemmons released his first album under his own name, Life in the Kingdom of Agreement, a slower, darker, and more personal work compared to his previous releases. The next year, he released Un-Fi, a compilation of live radio and concert recordings featuring Clemmons and regular violinist Anne De Wolff. As the solo releases became more consistent, the 2006 release "Yes Sir," bridging the Fullbliss style with his solo style, reflected in the album artist title "David Judson Clemmons & The Fullbliss".

In 2011, Clemmons released Cold White Earth, a lo-fi effort described on his website as "A Story of Love, Death and Hope." In April 2020, after what Clemmons described as a "era of hunting and gathering" released the epic album Tribe & Throne on his own record label, Village Slut Records. The album featured Thomas Götz (Beatsteaks) on drums and Earl Grey on bass. Tribe & Throne is regarded as a long-awaited and well-deserved breakthrough for Clemmons, showing a profound musical and lyrical depth as well as a creative blend of progressive and post-rock styles.

Another milestone for Clemmons was the release of "Lights For The Living"in 2022, showing an even greater shift to a progressive yet dark atmosphere, with "Sea Of Ends" as a fan favorite, notably the hauntingly dystopian short film/video accompanying the track.

In March of 2025 Clemmons released "Everything A War" showing masterly crafted songs from the writing aspect as well as in production quality, hailed by fans and press as Clemmons' greatest work to date. The album shifts between many styles, combining elements of Post-Rock, Progressive, Rock, Pop and Americana. Subsequently Clemmons' popularity seems to have increased vastly with the release of "Everything A War", reflected in publications such as Rock Hard Magazine where the album received a 10/10 score, and Guitar & Bass Magazine (Germany) listed the album as #1 Album of March 2025 beating out none other than Stephen Wilson and Don Airey (top artists in the genre).

== Discography ==
	Year	Album
With Ministers of Anger
With Ministers of Anger	2013	Renaissance
With Damn the Machine
With Damn the Machine	1993	Damn the Machine
With Damn the Machine	2021	Day One CD/LP(demos 1991/1992)
With Damn the Machine	2022	The Last Man CD/LP(demos 1992-1994)
With Damn the Machine	2025	Debut LP LP (demos 1991/1992)
With JUD
With JUD	1996	Something Better
With JUD	1997	Inner Mission
With JUD	1998	Chasing California
With JUD	2001	The Perfect Life
With JUD	2008	Sufferboy
With JUD	2016	Generation Vulture
With The Fullbliss
With The Fullbliss	1997	Bedroom Session
With The Fullbliss	2001	Fools and Their Splendor
With The Fullbliss	2001	This Temple Is Haunted
With The Fullbliss	2006	Yes Sir
As David Judson Clemmons
As David Judson Clemmons	2004	Life in the Kingdom of Agreement
As David Judson Clemmons	2005	Un-Fi
As David Judson Clemmons	2007	Yes Sir (with The Fullbliss)
As David Judson Clemmons	2011	Cold White Earth
As David Judson Clemmons	2020	Tribe & Throne
As David Judson Clemmons	2022	Lights For The Living
As David Judson Clemmons	2025	Everything A War
