= Skydancer (Dark Tranquillity album) =

Studio album by Dark Tranquillity
- Released: 30 August 1993
- Recorded: May–June 1993
- Studios: Studio Soundscape, Gothenburg, Sweden
- Genre: Melodic death metal
- Length: 47:45
- Label: Spinefarm
- Producers: Dark Tranquility, Dragan Tanascovic, Stefan Lindgren

Dark Tranquillity album chronology
Skydancer (1993)	The Gallery (1995)

Dark Tranquillity chronology
Tranquillity (1992)	Skydancer (1993)	Promo '94 (1994)

Alternative cover
- 1999 Reissue

Professional ratings
Review scores
Source	Rating
Allmusic	2.5/5 stars
The Metal Crypt	5/5 stars

Skydancer is the debut studio album by Swedish melodic death metal band Dark Tranquillity. This release was the last recorded output to feature vocalist Anders Fridén, later of In Flames, who left soon after to join In Flames and replaced by guitarist Mikael Stanne. Incidentally, Mikael Stanne was the lead vocalist on the first In Flames studio album, Lunar Strain.

The album is considered one of the formative releases of the melodic death metal genre, and has been praised for its lyrical content, ambition and complexity, though reviewers and some of the band members have also criticised it for its production, as well as its songwriting, which has been described as unfocused.

== Background and Recording ==
Dark Tranquillity was formed in December 1989 by childhood friends Anders Friden, Niklas Sundin, Martin Henriksson, Mikael Stanne and Anders Jivarp under the name Septic Broiler. At the time of its formation, none of the members knew how to play any of their instruments, and spent the first few months focusing on learning to play together. Jivarp was chosen to be the drummer as he was known to be athletic, with the rest of the band dividing their roles among themselves. Friden was eventually left with the role of vocalist as it was the only role left. At this time, the band primarily wrote more comedic songs, playing one show and eventually releasing their first demo, Enfeebled Earth in August 1990. By December however, the band decided it wished to move in a more serious direction, and changed its name to Dark Tranquillity. In an interview with the Nagual fanzine, Sundin stated: “when we formed the band we anticipated that we weren’t going to be satisfied with our music in, say one year, after the formation […] we planned to change the first name all the time”.

On 15 March 1991, the band entered Studio Soundscape to record their first demo. This decision to record at the studio was considered unusual by many. It was expected that being a Swedish band, Dark Tranquillity would choose to record in the more renowned Sunlight Studio in Stockholm, which had previously hosted bands such as Entombed, Dismember and Grave. However, the band chose Studio Soundscape as it was in Gothenburg, and would provide a more unique sound. The demo, Trail of Life Decayed, was released in June. It would soon sell roughly 700 copies and help to establish the band in the metal underground, as well as its reputation for more melodically oriented death metal. Two tracks from the demo would later be remixed and issued on 7” in 1992 by the Mexican label Guttural Records. After the demo's release, a series of label offers would soon ensue. The band would settle on Slaughter Records. The label had initially proposed a more substantial deal for a full-length album, but it was whittled down to just a 7” release as the band wished to test the waters.

In 1992, the band recorded their first EP, A Moonclad Reflection. During the recording sessions, Henriksson was forced to use a studio bass as his was broken. This led to a subpar sound, resulting in the band lowering the bass volume throughout much of the release. The EP was released in June under Slaughter Records, which would soon rename itself to Exhumed Productions. The two-track EP, released on 7” marked a sonic evolution from the demo, which was composed of songs which were several years old at that point. The songs, seven and a half minutes long each, were far more complex than anything the band had written before. Over 500 copies of the EP were sold. Though the band had been happy with the handling of the EP, tensions had built with Exhumed Productions over the handling of a compilation that was slated to include a song from Trail of Life Decayed, but went unreleased for over a year. A compilation entitled Requiem - Morbid Symphonies of Death would eventually be released in 1993, including the song “Yesterworld” from A Moonclad Reflection. However, the band would ultimately decide to sign with another label for their first full-length album. Around this time, the band had already written the first batch of songs that would be included on Skydancer, including “Nightfall By the Shore of Time”, “My Faeryland Forgotten”, and “Alone”.

The band returned to Studio Soundscape in May 1993 to begin work on their debut album. These sessions proved to be somewhat difficult. The band had only booked 10 days of studio time and had no experience recording a full-length album. The studio engineers also lacked experience with their newly bought gear and the band's death metal sound. The band would often present grand, ambitious but impractical ideas for the sessions to their producer, who would often shut them down. This resulted in an inefficient, rushed recording process, with the band often having to use first takes as they did not have the time to re-record them. Initially, the album was intended to be released by Necropolis Records with the title In the Golden Dawn of Winter. However, the band eventually settled on a one-album deal with Spinefarm Records, changing the title to Skydancer. Sundin has stated the title has no particular meaning, and it was chosen as it fit the mood of the album cover.

Skydancer was released on 30 August 1993. The album was made up entirely of newly written songs, with the band opting not to re-record anything from their past releases as they had enough new material to fill it out. Two songs, “Soulbreed” and “The Dying Fragment of an Elderly Dream” were also slated to be recorded for the album, but were ultimately scrapped due to time constraints. The cover photo was taken by Kenneth Johansson, who had gotten to know the band through his job as one of the chief photographers for the Swedish camera company Hasselblad. Stanne described the band looking for “something different from metal. Something atmospheric, something which would evoke something interesting” and chose one of Johansson's photographs which they considered “powerful and kind of serene, very evocative". Distributing the album would prove to be difficult for Spinefarm, which at that point had only released a few albums. The band promoted the album through tape trading, recording the album onto tapes which they would send off to other people. This would help to spread the album through word of mouth.

Skydancer has been reissued a number of times over the years. The original edition of the album was issued on cassette in Poland by Carrion Records in 1993. The album has frequently been bundled with the band's 1995 Of Chaos and Eternal Night EP, starting with a 1995 CD release of Skydancer in Japan released by Toy's Factory which featured the EP tracks as bonus tracks. In 1999, Century Media Records released a compilation of the two releases, featuring a new cover by Sundin. In 2013, the band revealed that they had reclaimed the rights to their Spinefarm releases, soon releasing a new version of Skydancer on Bandcamp, and later on physical mediums and streaming services. This new edition was remastered as the band was displeased with the uneven original master. A vinyl edition of the reissue was pressed, which featured another new cover by Sundin. This cover would later be included on a 2022 CD reissue by Daymare Recordings in Japan.

== Music and Lyrics ==
With Skydancer, Dark Tranquillity aimed to write a death metal album that incorporated melody and counterpoint, as well as complex song structures. The songs are heavily dense with “20+ riffs that never are repeated in the same way” according to Sundin, and feature elements unusual for a death metal album such as clean vocal and acoustic guitar sections. Sundin has cited bands such as Kreator, Sabbat and Helloween as inspirations for the band's early music, though he noted that they never tried to sound like them. Sundin has also noted a classical inspiration, particularly from composers such as Henry Purcell, Gustav Holst, Edvard Grieg and Antonio Vivaldi, which helped to influence the way the band would structure their songs, as well as their polyphonic harmonic style. The lyrics on the album are also noted for their complexity. These were primarily inspired by the band Sabbat, whose frontman, Martin Walkyier was known for his poetic lyrical style. Sundin and Stanne, who wrote the album's lyrics, were further inspired by their shared love of literature. In an early interview, Sundin cited romantic poets such as Percy Bysshe Shelley as inspirations for his lyrical style, stating his lyrics were based on “thoughts and emotions on death and life in general: poetic, philosophical tales on existence and the soul.”

“Nightfall by the Shore of Time” was one of the earliest songs written for Skydancer, having been written in 1992 shortly after the release of A Moonclad Reflection. In a retrospective interview with Decibel, Sundin stated the song had a space theme, and revealed the song was named after a photograph named “Nightfall by the Shore” which was used as the inner sleeve cover for Bathory's 1990 album Hammerheart. The song has been noted for its intense speed and variety of changes, and Sundin has identified it as his favourite song on the album. Stanne has also noted that the mix on the song is different from the rest of the album as the band's producer Dragan Tanasković's initial approach as a more pop/rock-oriented producer was to mix each song differently, before the band stated they wished to have each song mixed similarly.

“Crimson Winds” is the only song on the album not to have been co-written by Henriksson. The song's intro has been compared to the band My Dying Bride, while the uptempo section has been compared to power metal bands such as Helloween.

The songs “A Bolt of Blazing Gold” and “Through Ebony Archways” feature female vocals sung by Anna-Kaisa Avehall. Many songs on the album additionally feature acoustic guitar sections, performed by Sundin and Henriksson.

“My Faeryland Forgotten” was another of the initial few songs written for the album, and has been stated to be even older than the song “Yesterworld” from the A Moonclad Reflection EP. At the time it was written, Sundin described it as “probably [their] fastest song ever”. Other songs written early on include “Alone”, which Sundin has described as a “doom-ballad” and which was later re-released on their Of Chaos and Eternal Night EP with re-recorded vocals by Stanne, as well as “Skywards”, which Sundin has identified as one of his favourites from the album. However, Sundin also criticised the mix for the latter, noting that the guitars are too quiet.

“Shadow Duet” is the most lyrically dense song on the album and features both Friden and Stanne performing duet vocals, with album producer Stefan Lindgren performing additional clean vocals. Lindgren also performs backing vocals on the song “In Tears Bereaved”, while Stanne performs clean vocals on “A Bolt of Blazing Gold” and “Through Ebony Archways”.

== Track listing ==
All arrangements by Dark Tranquillity

No.	Title	Lyrics	Music	Length
1.	"Nightfall by the Shore of Time"	Sundin	Henriksson, Sundin	4:46
2.	"Crimson Winds"	Stanne	Sundin, Jivarp	5:28
3.	"A Bolt of Blazing Gold"	Sundin	Henriksson, Sundin	7:14
4.	"In Tears Bereaved"	Sundin	Sundin, Henriksson	3:50
5.	"Skywards"	Stanne	Sundin, Henriksson	5:06
6.	"Through Ebony Archways"	Stanne	Henriksson, Sundin	3:47
7.	"Shadow Duet"	Sundin	Henriksson, Sundin, Jivarp	7:05
8.	"My Faeryland Forgotten"	Sundin	Sundin, Henriksson	4:38
9.	"Alone"	Sundin	Henriksson, Sundin	5:45
Total length:				47:45

Japanese bonus tracks
No.	Title	Lyrics	Music	Length
10.	"Of Chaos and Eternal Night"	Stanne	Sundin, Johansson, Jivarp	5:12
11.	"With the Flaming Shades of Fall"	Stanne, Sundin	Sundin, Johansson, Henriksson	3:38
12.	"Away, Delight, Away"	Stanne	Henriksson, Johansson	5:22
13.	"Alone '94"	Sundin	Henriksson, Sundin	5:43
Total length:				67:40

== Personnel ==
=== Dark Tranquillity ===
- Anders Fridén − lead vocals on tracks 1−9
- Niklas Sundin − lead guitar, acoustic guitar, artwork (1999, 2013 reissues)
- Mikael Stanne − rhythm guitar on tracks 1−9 & 13, backing vocals on tracks 1−9, lead vocals on tracks 10−13
- Martin Henriksson − bass, acoustic guitar
- Anders Jivarp − drums

=== Additional musicians ===
- Anna-Kaisa Avehall − co-vocals on tracks 3 & 6
- Stefan Lindgren − co-vocals on tracks 4 & 7, engineering
- Fredrik Johansson − rhythm guitar on tracks 10−12

=== Additional Personnel ===
- Dragan Tanascovic − engineering
- Kenneth Johansson − photos
- Katarina Rydberg − photography
- Isak Edh − remastering
