= Alleycat Scratch =

American rock band

Background information
- Origin: San Francisco, California, U.S.
- Genres: Glam metal, sleaze rock, hard rock
- Years active: 1989–1994
- Labels: Kick Your Cat Records
- Past members: Eddie Robison; Devin Lovelace; Bobby "Boa" Dias; Robbie Black; Tommy Haight; Justin Sayne; Michael Michelle

Alleycat Scratch was an American glam metal/sleaze rock band formed in San Francisco, California in 1988. The band never gained popularity or commercial success due to the grunge movement of the 1990s. Their only studio album, 1993's Deadboys in Trash City, has been considered some of the best sleaze rock of the period. Alleycat Scratch disbanded in 1994.

== Past members ==
- Tommy Haight – lead vocals
- Devin Lovelace – lead guitars and vocals
- Justin Sayne – rhythm guitar and vocals
- Bobby "Boa" Dias – bass guitar and vocals
- Michael Joyce – drums
- Robbi Black – drums
- Michael Michelle – lead vocals
- Eddie Robison – lead vocals

== Discography ==
- 1993: Deadboys in Trash City (studio album)
- 2009: Last Call (compilation; unreleased material)
