= Adorned Brood =

German folk black metal band

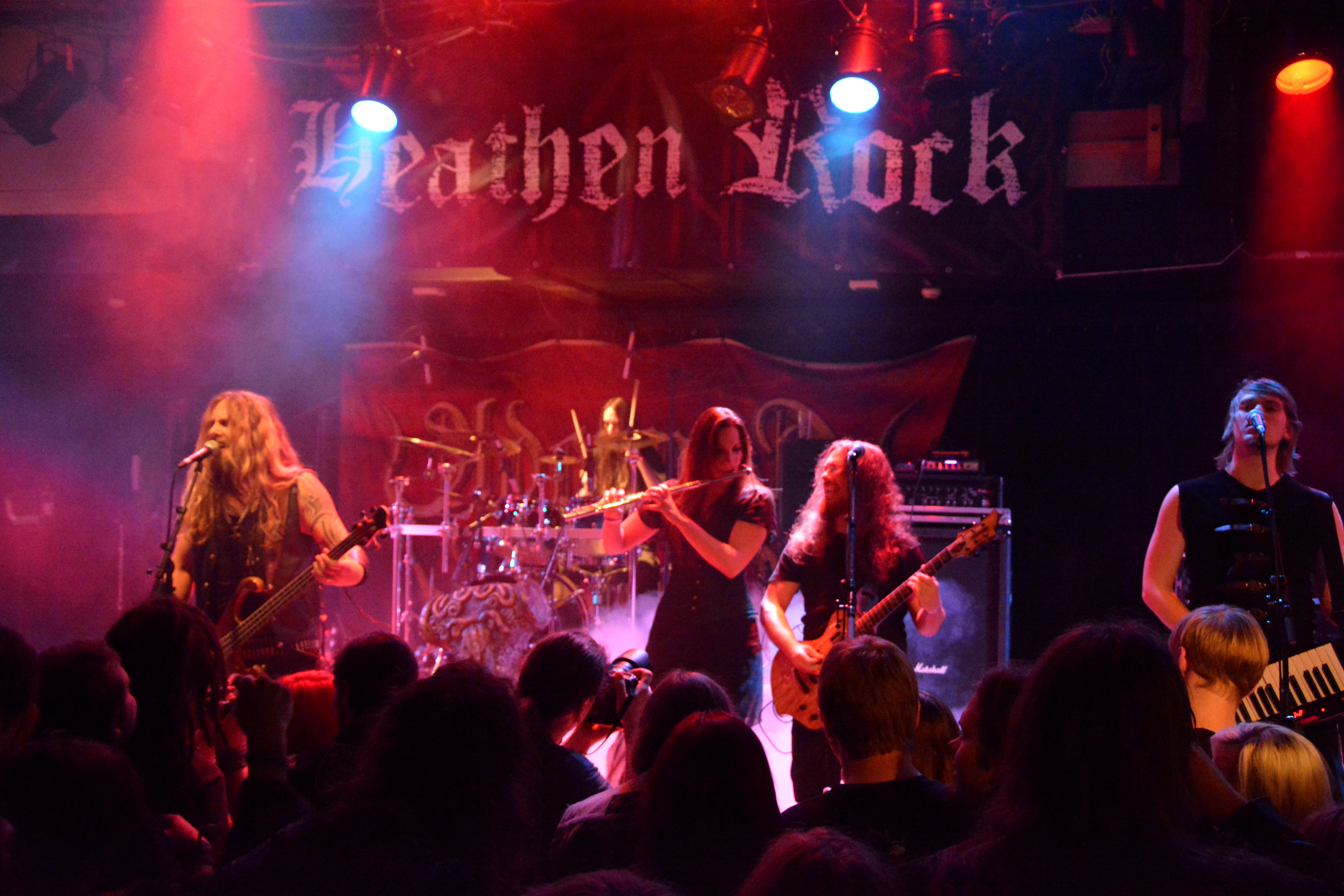
- Adorned Brood at Heathen Rock 2014

Background information
- Origin: Neuss, Germany
- Genres: Folk metal, black metal
- Years active: 1993–present
- Label: Black Bards Entertainment
- Members: Markus 'Teutobot' Frost; Anne; Thorsten Derks; Jan Jansohn; Niklas Enns; Mischa Kliege
- Website: www.adornedbrood.de

Adorned Brood is a German folk black metal band from Neuss.

== History (1993–2006) ==
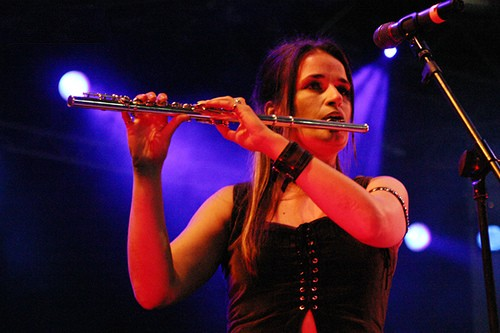
Ingeborg Anna at the Metal Inferno Festival, April 2007

Founded in 1993, Adorned Brood recorded two demo tapes. They signed to German label Folter Records. They recorded their first two albums, Hiltia and Wigand, in 1996 and 1998, respectively. 1,000 copies of each were released.

They later signed with Moonstorm Records and released their third album, Asgard, in 2000. Lead singer Erik Hecht, from Subway to Sally, joined Adorned Brood for their fourth album, Erdenkraft, in 2000.

They toured with Subway to Sally, and played at Summer Breeze Open Air, Partysan, Wave Gotik Treffen and Feuertanz Festival.

== Line-up ==
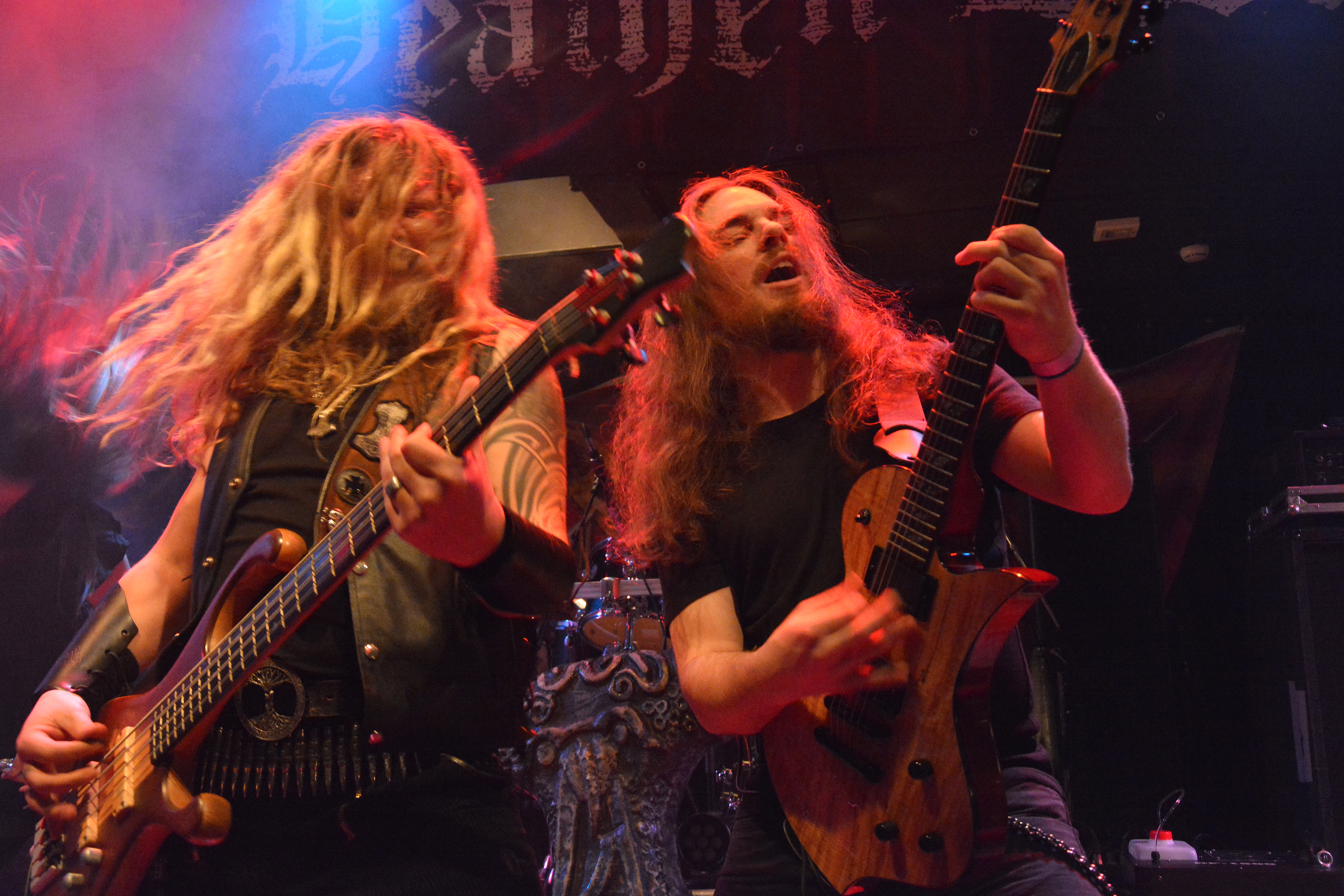
Adorned Brood at Heathen Rock 2014

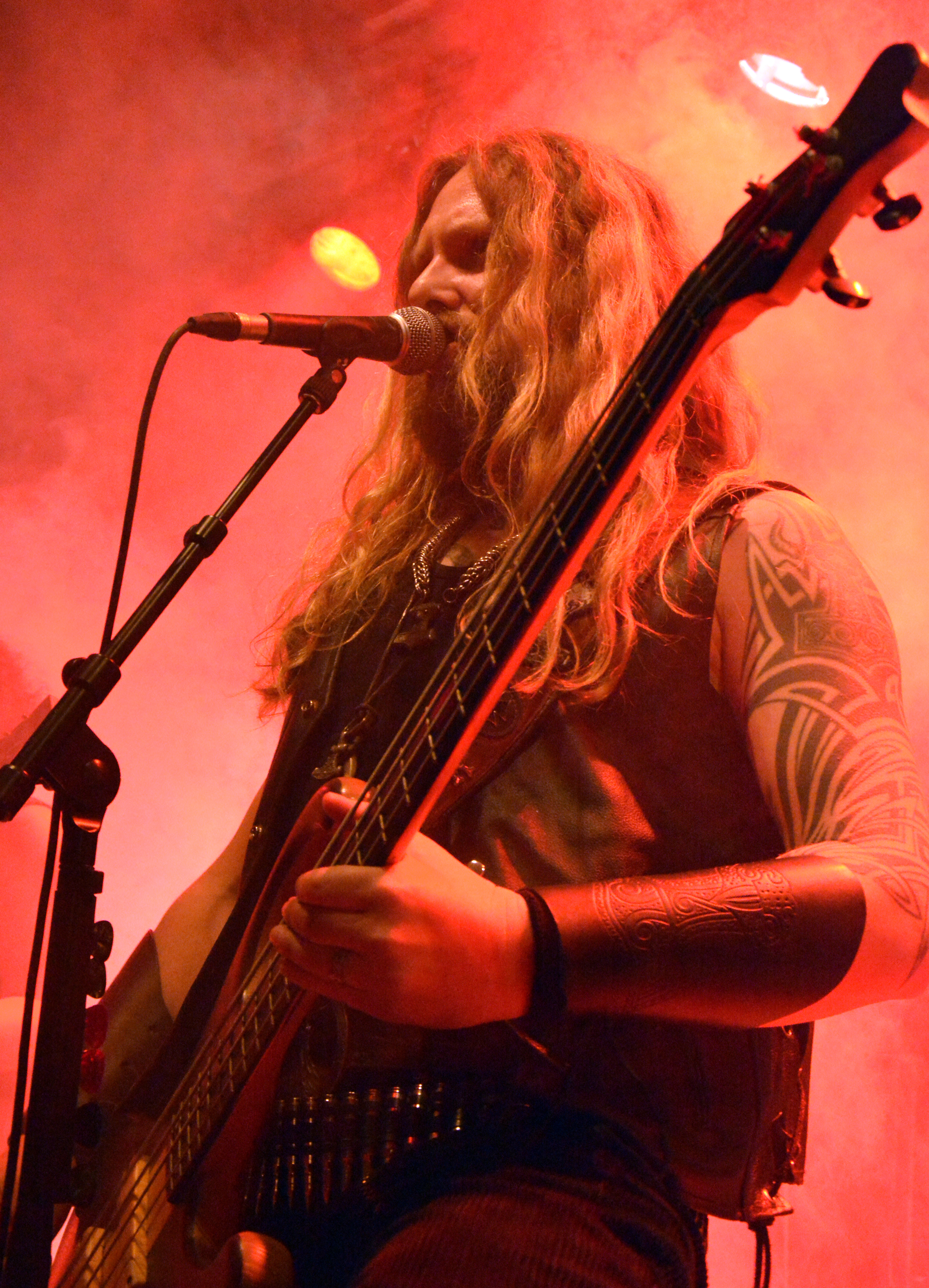
Markus Frost

=== Current line-up ===
- Markus 'Teutobot' Frost - vocals, bass guitar (1993–present)
- Thorsten Derks - guitar (2004–present)
- Jan Jansohn - guitars (2009-)
- Niklas Enns - keyboards (2008-)
- Anne - flute (2009-)
- Mischa Kliege - drums (2011-)

==== Live members ====
- Mike "Ariovist" Engelmann ("Black Sails Over Europe Tour 2009")

=== Former members ===
- Klaus Röhrig - vocals (1993–1995)
- Nermin 'Oberon' Hadžović - guitar (1993–1997)
- Thorsten Riekel - guitar (1994)
- Andreas Samek - guitar (1997–2004)
- Benjamin Ulkan - guitar (2001–2007)
- Ingeborg Anna Baumgärtel vocals, flute (1996–2008)
- Tim Baumgärtel - drums, piano (1998–2010)
- Mirko 'Pagan' Klier - guitar (1993–2001, 2007–2009)
- Mike 'Ariovist' Engelmann - drums (1993-1998 & 2010-2011)

== Discography ==
=== Demos ===
- Phobos/Deimos (1994)
- Wapen (1995)
- Rehearsal '96 (1996)

=== Studio albums ===
- Hiltia (1996)
- Wigand (1998)
- Asgard (2000)
- Erdenkraft (2002)
- Heldentat (2006)
- Noor (2008)
- Hammerfeste (2010)
- Kuningaz (2012)
