= Cirrha Niva =

Dutch progressive metal band

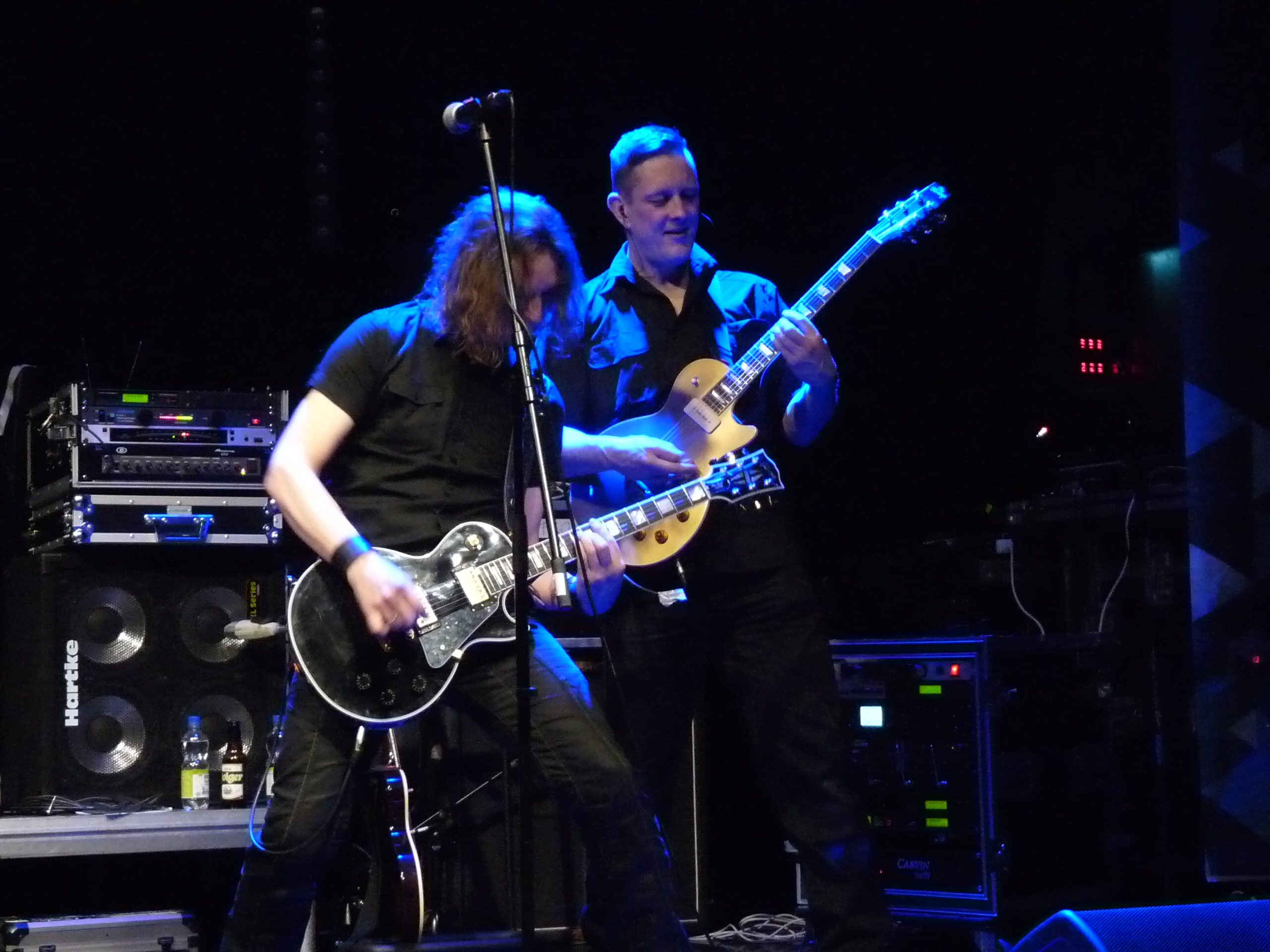
- Guitarists Rob Willemse and Carlo Heefer

Background information
- Origin: Netherlands
- Genres: Progressive metal
- Years active: 1993–present
- Label: Parnassus Records
- Members: Legrand; Rob Willemse; Carlo Heefer; Robert van Kooij; Michel Steenbekkers
- Past members: Arnold Kloek; Erik Smits; Daniel Huijben; Liselotte Hegt; Nathanael Taekema; Tommy White; Wiebe Slim; Jack Puijker; Wilbert van den Broek; Peter Vennema; Rommert van de Meer
- Website: www.cirrhaniva.nl

Cirrha Niva is a Dutch progressive metal band. The band was formed in 1993 by guitarists Peter Vennema and Rob Willemse. The band name is based on The Divine Comedy by Dante Alighieri and is a mutation/combination of the names Cirrha and Nisa, the two peaks of the mountain Parnassus that appear in the story.

== History ==
After formation and the demo recordings of "Alighieri’s Roots" and "After The Darkness", Cirrha Niva self-released their debut album The Mirror World Dimension in 1997. Shortly thereafter some lineup changes were made, with the previous singer Erik Smits and drummer Jack Puijker being replaced. The vocals were taken over by Arnold Kloek as of November 1997.

In January 1998, Tommy White (drums) and Wilbert van den Broek (keyboard) joined the band. The studio albums No More Psychosis, Enter The Future Exit and the rock opera Liaison de La Morte followed under this lineup.

The concept album Liaison de La Morte in 2001, was written by guitarist Rob Willemse and comprised 7 chapters. The rock opera combined horror and romance and was performed in operatic style with elaborate costumes, make-up and intricate choreography. The Dutch Foundation for Amateur Art Fund and Brabant Pop foundation for the province of North Brabant were official sponsors of the production.

In 2002, Cirrha Niva received a tour subsidy from the National Pop Instite (NPI) to perform the rock opera at the international music-, art- and lifestyle festival ‘Wave-Gotik-Treffen’ in Leipzig, Germany. The rock opera was featured in various major theaters in the Netherlands as well as in the Broerenkerk church in Zwolle until the performance tour ended in 2003.

After Liaison de La Morte, only founder guitarist Rob Willemse and drummer Tommy White remained active in the band. Newcomers in the line-up were the dynamic lead singer Legrand, guitarist Carlo Heefer and bassist Daniel Huijben. With this formation, the band recorded the acclaimed album For Moments Never Done in 2009, again with worldwide distribution by The End records and for Benelux through the distribution division of Suburban Records. Also featured on the album were singers Robin de Groot (Chiraw) and Manda Ophuis (Nemesea), keyboardist Joost van den Broek (After Forever) and saxophonists Bouke Visser and Yuval Kramer (Amaseffer).

The band has toured with Lacuna Coil (Italy), Evergrey (Sweden), Pain of Salvation (Sweden), Planet X (USA), Skyclad (UK) and Crimson Glory (USA).

Cirrha Niva released a new studio album Out Of The Freakshow, on 14 April 2016. Containing eight tracks with a total playing time of 56 minutes, it was made available as a CD-Digipack and Gatefold 180g double black vinyl.

Psychotic Waltz frontman Devon Graves, Theater Equation keyboardist Erik van Ittersum and Scarlet Stories singer Lisette van den Berg appeared as guests for various tracks. Interim band member Nathanael Taekema (Thomas Zwijsen Trio) created and played all drums for the album, while Robert van Kooij took up the position of permanent band member and live drummer immediately after the release.

== Discography ==
=== Demos ===
- After the Darkness (1992)
- Alighieri's Roots (1993)
- No More Psychosis (1998)

=== Albums ===
- The Mirror World Dimension (1997)
- Liaison de la Morte (2001)
- For Moments Never Done (2009)
- Out of the Freakshow (2016)

=== EPs ===
- Enter the Future Exit (1999)
