= The Brain from Planet Arous =

1957 film by Nathan H. Juran

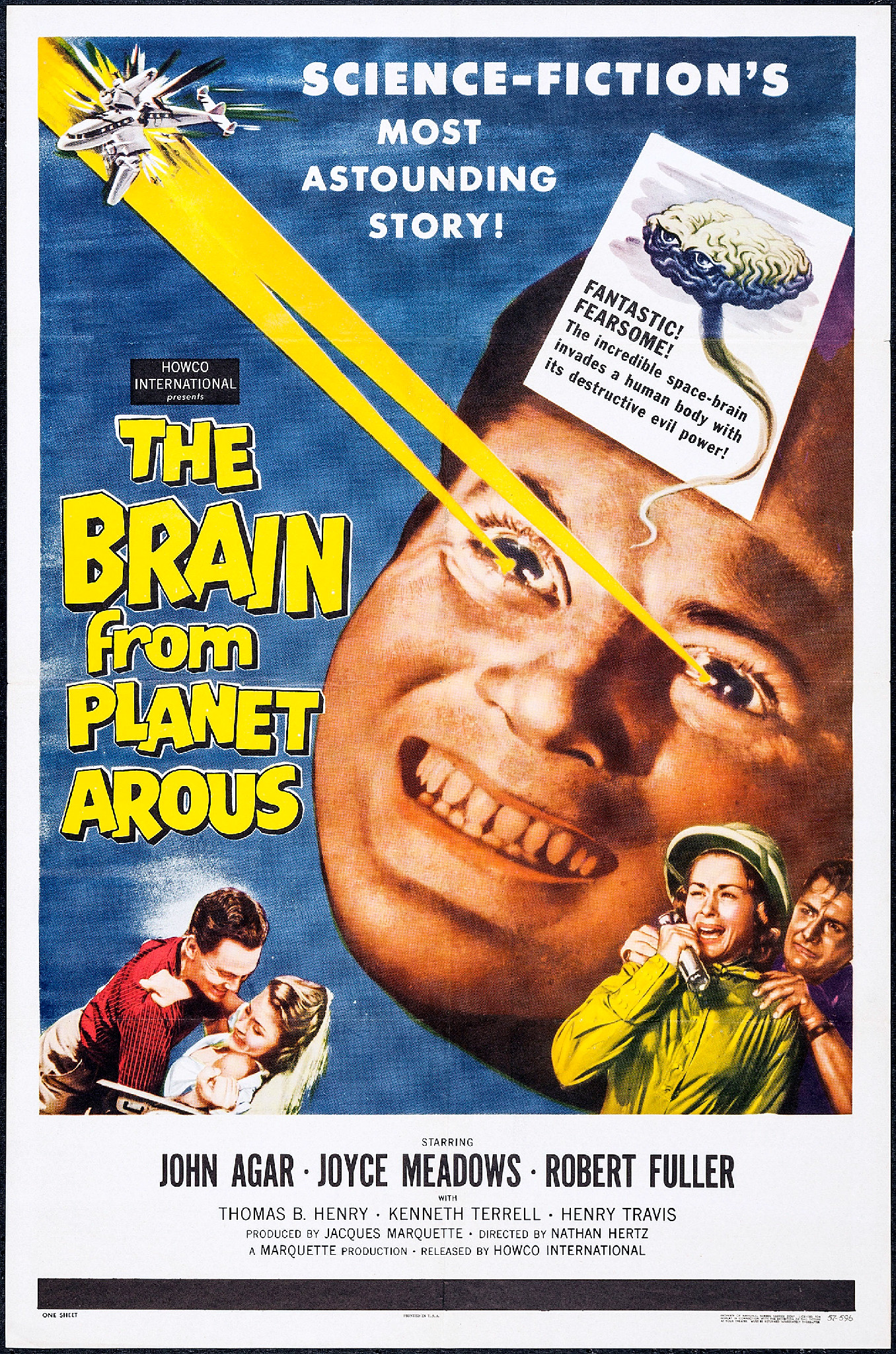
- Theatrical release poster
- Directed by: Nathan H. Juran as "Nathan Hertz"
- Written by: Ray Buffum
- Produced by: Jacques R. Marquette
- Starring: John Agar; Joyce Meadows; Robert Fuller
- Cinematography: Jacques R. Marquette
- Music by: Walter Greene
- Distributed by: Howco International
- Release date: December 26, 1957
- Running time: 71 minutes
- Country: United States
- Language: English
- Budget: $58,000

The Brain from Planet Arous is a 1957 independently made American black-and-white science fiction film, produced by Jacques R. Marquette, directed by Nathan H. Juran, that stars John Agar, Joyce Meadows, and Robert Fuller. It was written by Ray Buffum. The film was released on December 26, 1957, by Howco International on a double feature with Teenage Monster (1957).

The storyline features themes of alien possession and world domination by an alien named Gor. Another alien, Vol, has been sent to Earth to capture the criminal Gor and return him to their home world.

== Plot ==
An outer space terrorist from a planet named Arous, a brain-shaped creature named Gor, arrives on Earth and possesses young scientist Steve March. Gor proceeds to use his vast, destructive powers to bend the world to his will, threatening to wipe out the capital city of any nation that dares to defy him.

Meanwhile, Vol, another brain creature from Arous, arrives and eventually inhabits the body of March's fiancee's dog. Vol goes on to explain that Gor is a wanted criminal on their world. His only physical weakness is the human body's fissure of Rolando, and Gor is only vulnerable during the brief period when he needs to exit his host to absorb oxygen.

== Cast ==
- John Agar as Steve March
- Joyce Meadows as Sally Fallon
- Robert Fuller as Dan Murphy
- Thomas Browne Henry as John Fallon
- Kenneth Terrell as Colonel in conference room
- Henry Travis as Colonel Frogley
- E. Leslie Thomas as General Brown
- Tim Graham as Sheriff Wiley Pane
- Bill Giorgio as Russian
- Kenner G. Kemp as military man at meeting
- Dale Tate as Professor/voices of Gor & Vol (uncredited)

== Production ==
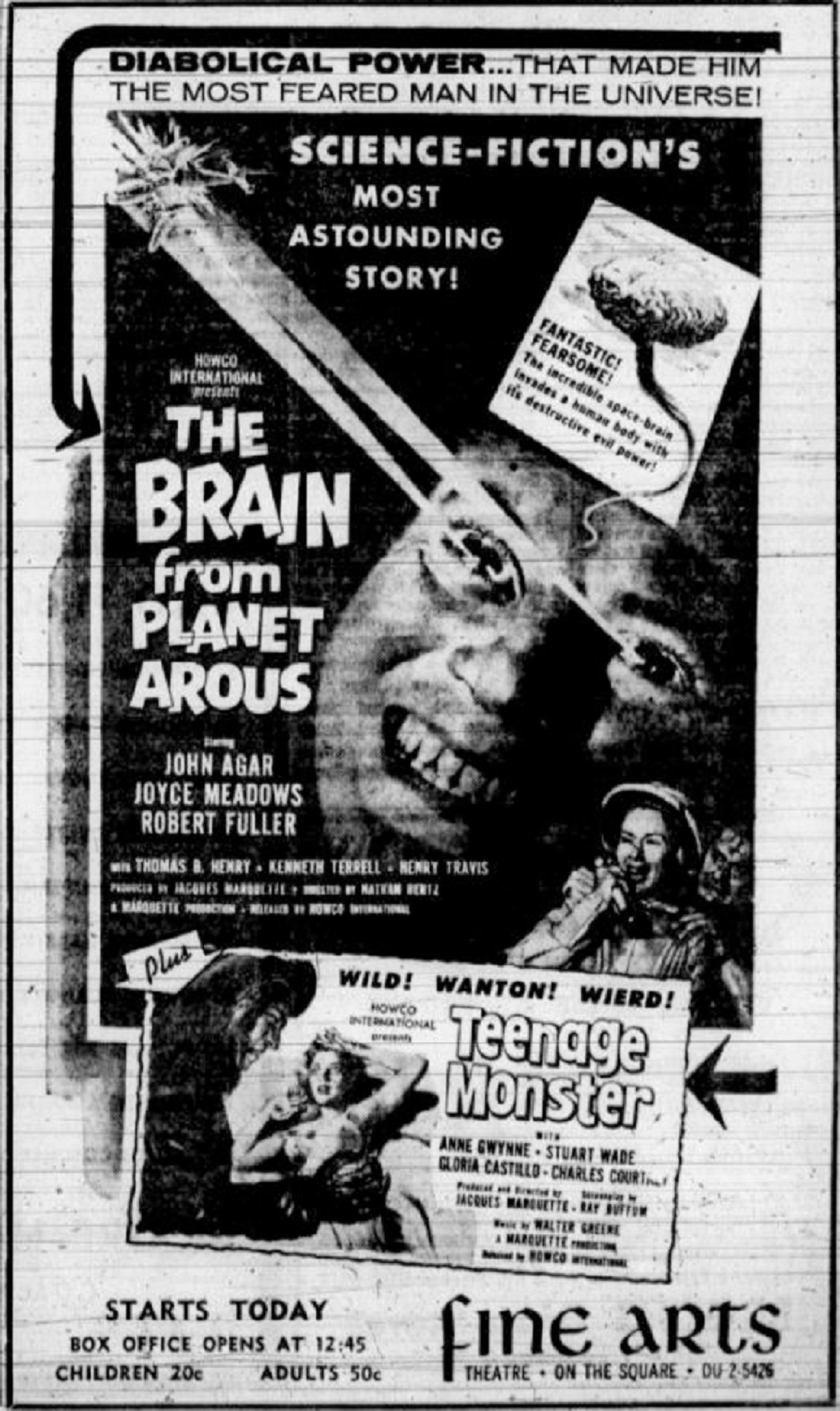
Advertisement for The Brain from Planet Arous and co-feature, Teenage Monster.

The special effect for Agar's eyes was achieved by using contact lenses lined with metal foil. These were used a decade later by actor Gary Lockwood during the second Star Trek TV series pilot episode "Where No Man Has Gone Before".

Stock footage of unoccupied houses being flash-incinerated in above-ground atomic bomb tests was used to demonstrate Gor's psychic powers.

The plot of an alien interstellar policeman pursuing a dangerous, space-faring criminal who must slip into and possess the bodies of Earth lifeforms is similar to the classic science fiction novel Needle by Hal Clement that was first published in 1949 as a multi-part serial in Astounding Science Fiction magazine. The 1987 film The Hidden also shares similar story elements without being a direct adaptation of Clement's novel.

Director Nathan Juran was unhappy with the final film and changed his screen credit to the pseudonym "Nathan Hertz".

== Reception ==
The Brain from Planet Arous currently holds a score of 20% ("Rotten") at the film review aggregator website Rotten Tomatoes, with an average rating of 3.6/10 based on 5 reviews.

The Monthly Film Bulletin wrote: "A far-fetched science fiction thriller in the low budget class, well paced and energetic but disappointingly conventional in format. The spherical cerebral invader is largely a bad case of superimposition."

Variety wrote: "This modest-budgeter stacks up as a better-than-average entry in the seemingly endless scientific fiction cycle, certain to attract teenage attention. ... Agar turns in a competent performance in lead role, and Miss Meadows is okay as femme interest. Other portrayals are stock, as the majority of the technical credits. Direction of Nathan Hertz keeps things on the move."

In his review of the movie, although film critic Glenn Erickson wrote "Those looking for a movie to laugh at will find no end of mirth herein," he also reports that the "direction of this minimal budget picture is nothing to be ashamed of" and "Producer/Cameraman Jacques Marquette can be proud of his sharp b&w photography."

Writing in Entertainment Weekly, critic Steve Simels described the movie as "fairly standard power-mad-alien-wants-to-have-sex-with-earth-women nonsense," but that the film was "redeemed by a few loony plot twists [and] nice tongue-in-cheek performances."

== In popular culture ==
Although its B-movie status gave it poor reviews upon its initial release, the film has since become a cult classic. It has been parodied on American television: The comedy series Malcolm in the Middle uses a segment of The Brain from Planet Arous as part of its opening credits. A clip was also used in the opening scene of the comedy film Ernest Scared Stupid that featured a collage of horror films. The Brain from Planet Arous is also featured in the film The Butcher Boy (1997), which is viewed by the main character at his local movie theater.

In 1983, Stephen King told Playboy magazine that his novel "Carrie, for example, derived to a considerable extent from a terrible grade-B movie called The Brain from Planet Arous."

The voice clip "Your feeling of helplessness is your best friend, savage" from the film was used in the 1997 Jay Weinland track "Sound Stage Strut" as part of the Need for Speed II soundtrack. The same clip was used 2001 in Frank Klepacki's track "Brain Freeze" as part of the Command & Conquer: Yuri's Revenge soundtrack, together with another voice clip from the film in the song "Drok".

The credits track for the film House of the Dead 2 also used a vocal sample of the film, as did a 1991 TV Guide ad, which asked, "Were you watching this when the Beverly Hills 90210 Christmas special aired"?, prompting multiple viewers to respond "The Brain from Planet Arous was the better choice".

The electronic musician Deadmau5 used the voice sample "After I'm gone, your Earth will be free to live out its miserable span of existence, as one of my satellites, and that's how it's going to be..." from the film in his track "Moar Ghosts 'n' Stuff" from the album For Lack of a Better Name. This sample was also used in 1997 by DJ Buzz Fuzz in the track "Jealousy (Is A M.F.)", which appeared on volume 17 of the Thunderdome series, as well as by Swedish gothic metal band Tiamat in the track "Lucy" from their 1999 album Skeleton Skeletron, Norwegian gothic metal band The Crest in the song "In This Cage" from their debut 2002 album Letters from Fire, Alien Vampires in his track "You'll All Die", Norwegian industrial metal band The Kovenant in the track "Acid Theatre" from their 2003 album SETI, Japanese musician Toshiyuki Kakuta (known by his DJ name as L.E.D.) in many of his original tracks for Beatmania IIDX, British space rock band Hawkwind at the beginning of track "Rama (The Prophecy)" in their 2023 album The Future Never Waits,, Azax Syndrom in the track "Shockwave", The Maine in the track Face Towards The Sun from their 2021 album XOXO: From Love and Anxiety in Real Time, and Fïx8:Sëd8 in the track "Lesson In Humility". Dubstep producer Datsik in his song "Light The Fuse" and Cigue band in their track "Dear Hatred" have also used the first part of this sample.

The line "You must find strength", spoken by Vol, is used in the beginning of the Crossbreed song "Pure Energy", as well as in the Strapping Young Lad song "Decimator". Yoko Kanno also used the sample on the track "Autumn in Ganymede" composed for Cowboy Bebop.

The KLF sample the line, "Your feeling of helplessness is your best friend, savage" on their album Chill Out. The song "Rule The Universe" by Bass Mekanik features the sample multiple times.

The sample of Gor's introduction has also been featured in various songs, including "Maid-san Para Para" by Pilko Minami and in L.E.D.'s remix of the Anubis Final Battle theme for the album Zone of the Enders ReMix Edition.

In 2002 for their song "Perfekte Droge", from their album Herzwerk II the German band Megaherz. used Gor's laugh and a sample of the line "I have powers that equal and surpass the powers of Gor..."

Dialog samples taken from Brain from Planet Arous are available in Sony's royalty-free sample library pack, Methods of Mayhem: Industrial Toolkit.

The film was the inspiration for the "Zontar" episode of Second City Television.

In 2022, actor Joyce Meadows played both herself and Sally Fallon (her character in The Brain from Planet Arous) in a 13-minute short film that was part-promotional movie and part-comedy for The Film Detective's Blu-ray/DVD release of a restored version of the original 1957 movie. Titled Not the Same Old Brain, it was written, directed, and filmed by David Schecter of the Monstrous Movie Music soundtrack CD label. (source: The Film Detective)

== See also ==
- Donovan's Brain, an earlier film dealing with "brain" possession
