= Virago (EP) =

EP by Theatre of Tragedy
- Released: 26 May 1999
- Genre: Gothic metal, death-doom
- Length: 30:38
- Language: English, Early Modern English, German
- Label: Massacre
- Producer: Pete Coleman

Theatre of Tragedy chronology
| Aégis (1998) | Virago (1999) | Musique (2000) |

Virago is a 1999 EP collection by the Norwegian gothic metal band Theatre of Tragedy. The disc contains tracks left off the album Aégis of 1998, plus tracks from Velvet Darkness They Fear and the band's first album, Theatre of Tragedy.

Released on 26 May 1999, this EP is officially known as Massacre's Classix Shape Edition Vol. 1 being the first one in a series of ten shaped compact discs by Massacre Records. It was later unofficially released by the Russian pirate label Spurk on a regular compact disc under the title Virago, with the bonus track "Decades".

== Track list ==
1. "Der Tanz der Schatten" – 5:12
2. "Der Spiegel" – 5:18
3. "Samantha" – 4:11
4. "A Hamlet for a Slothful Vassal" – 4:02
5. "Virago" – 5:20
