= At Play =

Compilation album by Deadmau5
- Released: October 20, 2008
- Recorded: 2006–2007
- Genres: Progressive house; electro house
- Length: 65:46
- Label: Play
- Producer: Joel Zimmerman

Deadmau5 chronology
Random Album Title (2008)	At Play (2008)	For Lack of a Better Name (2009)

Singles from At Play
- 1. "This Is the Hook" Released: October 25, 2006

Alternate cover
- 2009 reissue cover

Professional ratings
Review scores
Source	Rating
AllMusic	3/5 stars
Sputnikmusic	3.1/5 stars

At Play (also known as Deadmau5 at Play and At Play Vol. 1) is a compilation album by Canadian electronic music producer Deadmau5. It is the first installment of Play Records' At Play series. It was released on October 20, 2008.

The album consists of several Deadmau5 tracks from his earlier releases (such as Vexillology), later releases (such as Random Album Title), and collaborations with Melleefresh. The tracks are suitable for DJs to play and mix.

== Background ==
In 2008, Play Records (Zimmerman's label at that time) parted ways with deadmau5, and the company gained ownership of the catalogue of tracks Deadmau5 produced during his time with them as part of the agreement. At Play was Play's first release after Zimmerman departed from the label.

In 2009, Play Records reissued At Play. All of the tracks remained the same, but the album was renamed to At Play, Vol. 1, and the Play Records logo on the cover was replaced with a yellow "Mau5head".

== Track listing ==
At Play track listing
No.	Title	Artist	Length
1.	"Vanishing Point"	deadmau5	7:02
2.	"Sex, Lies, Audiotape"	deadmau5	5:56
3.	"Cocktail Queen"	Melleefresh vs. deadmau5	5:27
4.	"Faxing Berlin"	deadmau5	8:39
5.	"Hey Baby" (Adam K Dirty Remix)	Melleefresh vs. deadmau5	6:19
6.	"Turning Point"	deadmau5	7:02
7.	"This Is the Hook"	BSOD	5:58
8.	"1981"	deadmau5	6:04
9.	"Dr. Funkenstein"	deadmau5	7:13
10.	"Afterhours"	Melleefresh vs. deadmau5	6:07
Total length:			65:46

== Charts ==
Chart performance for At Play
Chart (2012)	Peak position
US Billboard 200	163
US Top Catalog Albums (Billboard)	36

== Release history ==
Release history for At Play
Country	Date	Format	Label
Various	October 20, 2008	Digital download	Play
Various	November 20, 2008	CD	Play
Various	May 26, 2009	CD	Play
