= Fiction (Dark Tranquillity album) =

Studio album by Dark Tranquillity
- Released: 19 April 2007
- Recorded: October – November 2006
- Studio: Studio Fredman and Rogue Music
- Genre: Melodic death metal
- Length: 52:14
- Language: English
- Label: Napalm Records; Century Media (UK)
- Producer: Dark Tranquillity, Tue Madsen

Dark Tranquillity chronology
Character (2005)	Fiction (2007)	We Are the Void (2010)

Fiction is the eighth studio album by Swedish melodic death metal band Dark Tranquillity. It was released by Napalm Records on 19 April 2007, and by Century Media in the UK on 23 April, and in the US on 24 April.

This is the last new material to feature Michael Nicklasson as their bassist before leaving in August 2008 and the last release to be recorded at Studio Fredman.

== Background ==
This album marked a few returns of previous quirks the band had done in the past - the song "Inside the Particle Storm" marks the return of Sundin writing lyrics again since "Tongues" from The Mind's I, Mikael Stanne utilizes clean vocals in addition to his usual growled vocals on "Misery's Crown" since "Emptier Still" from Haven and a guest female vocalist on "The Mundane and the Magic" since "Undo Control" from Projector.

An expanded edition was released in North America on 27 May and was scheduled for Worldwide release on 23 June 2008, containing two bonus tracks previously released in Australia and Japan, two previously unreleased tracks and two tracks taken from the band's live performance in Summer Breeze festival in 2007. The expanded edition also contains a bonus DVD with live songs, behind the scene footage, Character's "The New Build" promo video, and the "Focus Shift" video clip. In addition, the expanded edition features an extended booklet layout, an alternative cover artwork, and includes also a free Dark Tranquillity patch.

== Reception ==
Professional ratings
Review scores
Source	Rating
About.com	4.5/5 stars
AllMusic	4/5 stars
Metal Hammer	7/10
PopMatters	8/10
Sputnikmusic	4/5 stars

The album was generally well-received, with the album being called "another worthwhile addition to Dark Tranquillity's impressive discography." It was also noted that the album was similar to Character, in terms of musical style.

== Track listing ==
All lyrics are written by Mikael Stanne, except where noted.

No.	Title	Lyrics	Music	Length
1.	"Nothing to No One"		Martin Henriksson; Niklas Sundin	4:10
2.	"The Lesser Faith"		Henriksson; Michael Nicklasson; Anders Jivarp; Sundin	4:37
3.	"Terminus (Where Death Is Most Alive)"		Henriksson; Sundin	4:24
4.	"Blind at Heart"		Henriksson	4:21
5.	"Icipher"		Martin Brändström; Jivarp; Henriksson	4:39
6.	"Inside the Particle Storm"	Sundin	Sundin	5:29
7.	"Empty Me"		Henriksson	4:59
8.	"Misery's Crown"		Brändström; Sundin; Jivarp; Henriksson	4:14
9.	"Focus Shift"		Henriksson	3:36
10.	"The Mundane and the Magic"		Henriksson; Jivarp	5:17

Japanese bonus track
No.	Title	Music	Length
11.	"A Closer End"	Henriksson; Jivarp; Sundin	4:10

Australian bonus track
No.	Title	Lyrics	Music	Length
11.	"Winter Triangle"	Instrumental	Sundin	2:18

Expanded Edition
No.	Title	Lyrics	Music	Length
11.	"A Closer End"		Henriksson; Jivarp; Sundin	4:10
12.	"Winter Triangle"	Instrumental	Sundin	2:18
13.	"Below the Radiance"		Henriksson; Jivarp	3:26
14.	"Silence in the House of Tongues"	Instrumental	Sundin	3:24
15.	"Terminus (Where Death Is Most Alive) (Live at Summer Breeze Open Air 2007)"		Henriksson; Sundin	4:40
16.	"The Lesser Faith (Live at Summer Breeze 2007)"		Henriksson; Nicklasson; Jivarp; Sundin	4:48

== Expanded Edition DVD ==
The expanded version also contains a bonus DVD with over 45 minutes of live recordings and promo videos:

1. "Focus Shift" (promo video)
2. "Terminus (Where Death Is Most Alive)" (brick-movie)
3. "Focus Shift" (rehearsal room video)
4. "Blind At Heart" (live)
5. "Final Resistance" (live)
6. "Misery's Crown" (live)
7. "Terminus (Where Death Is Most Alive)" (live)
8. "The Lesser Faith" (live)
9. "The New Build" (live)
10. "The Endless Feed" (live)

== Personnel ==
=== Dark Tranquillity ===
- Mikael Stanne − vocals
- Niklas Sundin − guitars
- Martin Henriksson − guitars
- Martin Brändström − electronics
- Michael Nicklasson − bass
- Anders Jivarp − drums

=== Other credits ===
- Nell Sigland − additional vocals on "The Mundane and the Magic"
- Album artwork and design by Cabin Fever Media

== Charts ==
Chart	Peak position
Finnish Albums (Suomen virallinen lista)	19
French Albums (SNEP)	145
German Albums (Offizielle Top 100)	59
Italian Albums (FIMI)	34
Swedish Albums (Sverigetopplistan)	12
