= Character (Dark Tranquillity album) =

- Normal CD cover

Studio album by Dark Tranquillity
- Released: 25 January 2005
- Recorded: February/March 2004
- Studios: Studio Fredman, The Room and Rogue Music
- Genre: Melodic death metal
- Length: 48:35
- Language: English
- Label: Century Media
- Producer: Dark Tranquillity

Dark Tranquillity chronology
Lost to Apathy (2004)	Character (2005)	Fiction (2007)

Singles from Character
- 1. "Lost to Apathy" Released: 15 November 2004 (EP)

Digipak edition
- Digipak edition cover

LP edition
- LP edition cover

Professional ratings
Review scores
Source	Rating
AllMusic	4/5 stars
Blabbermouth.net	8/10
Lambgoat	8/10

Character is the seventh studio album by Swedish melodic death metal band Dark Tranquillity. The album was released on 25 January 2005 through Century Media Records. The corresponding single, "Lost to Apathy", was previously featured on the Lost to Apathy EP, their first EP released in nearly ten years. The album title appears in the song "Am I 1?".

This album is heavier than the band's previous album, with more aggressive and faster songs. Like the band's previous album, there are no clean vocals. The enhanced CD and digipak editions of the album include the video clip for the single "Lost to Apathy". A music video was also made for "The New Build". The album was also released as an LP with different cover art.

== Track listing ==
No.	Title	Music	Length
1.	"The New Build"	Henriksson; Nicklasson; Jivarp	4:08
2.	"Through Smudged Lenses"	Henriksson; Sundin	4:14
3.	"Out of Nothing"	Henriksson; Jivarp; Nicklasson	3:54
4.	"The Endless Feed"	Brändström; Jivarp	4:46
5.	"Lost to Apathy"	Henriksson	4:38
6.	"Mind Matters"	Henriksson; Sundin; Jivarp	3:32
7.	"One Thought"	Henriksson; Jivarp	4:09
8.	"Dry Run"	Nicklasson; Jivarp; Sundin	4:09
9.	"Am I 1?"	Jivarp; Brändström; Sundin; Henriksson	4:31
10.	"Senses Tied"	Henriksson	4:05
11.	"My Negation"	Henriksson; Nicklasson; Jivarp	6:29

=== Japanese version ===
The Japanese version of the album contains two bonus tracks previously released on the Lost to Apathy EP:

No.	Title	Length
12.	"Derivation TNB"	3:25
13.	"The Endless Feed" (Chaos Seed Remix)	3:56

=== Digipak edition ===
There is a second CD included with the digipak. It includes the following tracks:

No.	Title	Length
1.	"Lost to Apathy" (video clip)	4:01
2.	"Damage Done" (live in Korea)	3:41
3.	"The Wonders at Your Feet" (live in Korea)	3:05
4.	"Final Resistance" (live in Korea)	3:11
5.	"The Treason Wall" (live in Korea)	3:43

- Track 1 is the music video version of the song. Tracks 2–5 were recorded live at the Busan Rock Festival in 2004 in Korea.

== Credits ==
Musicians

- Mikael Stanne − vocals
- Niklas Sundin − guitar
- Martin Henriksson − guitar
- Michael Nicklasson − bass
- Martin Brändström − electronics
- Anders Jivarp − drums

Album production

- Drums recorded at Studio Fredman
- Guitars, Bass, Vocals recorded at The Room
- Electronics recorded at Rogue Music
- Mixed by Fredrik Nordström at Studio Fredman
- Mastered by Peter In de Betou at Tailor Maid
- Produced by Dark Tranquillity

Other credits

- Album artwork and design by Cabin Fever Media
- Live photos appearing on album artwork by Diana van Tankeren
- Music videos for "Lost to Apathy and "The New Build" directed by Roger Johansson and Alex Hansson for Bobby Works AB
- Music videos for "Lost to Apathy and "The New Build" produced by Roger Johansson
- Lyrics written by Mikael Stanne

== Charts ==
Chart	Peak position
Finnish Albums (Suomen virallinen lista)	30
French Albums (SNEP)	173
German Albums (Offizielle Top 100)	83
Italian Albums (FIMI)	57
Swedish Albums (Sverigetopplistan)	3
