= A Rose for the Dead =

EP by Theatre of Tragedy
- Released: 1 April 1997
- Recorded: Commusication Studio, Beindersheim, Germany, July and 7–10 October 1996; Additional recordings at Mansion Studio, Stavanger, Norway, 2–3 November 1996; Tracks 4 & 5 remixed at Danse Macabre Studios, Bayreuth, Germany
- Genre: Gothic metal, death-doom
- Length: 32:22
- Language: English, Early Modern English, German
- Label: Swanlake/Massacre
- Producer: Pete Coleman

Theatre of Tragedy chronology
Velvet Darkness They Fear (1996)	A Rose for the Dead (1997)	Aégis (1998)

Professional ratings
Review scores
Source	Rating
Chronicles of Chaos	7/10

A Rose for the Dead is an EP released by the Norwegian gothic metal band Theatre of Tragedy in 1997. It was the band's last release using the doom metal-influenced sound that Theatre of Tragedy had originally adopted. "A Rose for the Dead" and "Der Spiegel" are leftovers from the Velvet Darkness They Fear recording sessions, which were completed after the release of that album. "As the Shadows Dance" is the English-sung version of the single "Der Tanz der Schatten", while the remixes involved the electro-industrial musician Bruno Kramm of the German duo Das Ich. Finally, "Decades" is a cover version of a Joy Division song, which Theatre of Tragedy had recorded for a Norwegian tribute album.

== Track listing ==
All lyrics are written by Raymond Rohonyi; all music is composed by Theatre of Tragedy, except "Decades" lyrics and music by Ian Curtis, Peter Hook, Stephen Morris, Bernard Sumner.

No.	Title	Length
1.	"A Rose for the Dead"	5:11
2.	"Der Spiegel"	5:17
3.	"As the Shadows Dance"	5:28
4.	"And When He Falleth" (Remix)	5:13
5.	"Black as the Devil Painteth" (Remix)	4:29
6.	"Decades" (Joy Division cover)	6:36
Total length:		32:22

== Personnel ==
=== Theatre of Tragedy ===
- Raymond Rohonyi - vocals
- Liv Kristine Espenæs - vocals
- Tommy Lindal - guitars
- Geir Flikkeid - guitars (he had already left the band at time of publication)
- Lorentz Aspen - keyboards
- Eirik T. Saltrø - bass
- Hein Frode Hansen - drums

=== Production ===
- Pete Coleman - producer, engineer, mixing with Theatre of Tragedy
- Gerhard Magin - engineer, mixing, mastering
- Øyvind Grødem - mixing
- Bruno Kramm - remix on tracks 4 and 5
