= Assembly (Theatre of Tragedy album) =

Studio album by Theatre of Tragedy
- Released: March 4, 2002
- Recorded: Late 2001
- Studio: Karillo Studio, Porvoo and MD Studios, Helsinki, Finland
- Genre: Industrial rock, electropop
- Length: 42:29
- Label: Nuclear Blast
- Producer: Hiili Hiilesmaa

Theatre of Tragedy chronology
Closure: Live (2001)	Assembly (2002)	Storm (2006)

Singles from Assembly
- 1. "Envision" Released: 2002; 2. "Let You Down" Released: 2002

Professional ratings
Review scores
Source	Rating
AllMusic	4/5 stars
Femme Metal	7.5/10
Metal Storm	2.5/10
Musical Discoveries	5/5 stars
Rock Hard	4.5/10 8.0/10

Assembly is the fifth studio album by the Norwegian metal band Theatre of Tragedy, released in 2002. It continued the group's move from gothic to a more electronic and pop style of music. This style was described as similar to "Siouxsie and the Banshees jamming with Ace of Base".

Assembly was the last Theatre of Tragedy album featuring the vocals of Liv Kristine. According to Kristine the band fired her by email, citing musical differences.

While Musique themes mentioned radios, streetfighting and nightlife, the songs on Assembly generally focus more on people than technology, such as in "Play" and "Let You Down". The album's modern setting is still emphasised by "Automatic Lover", which refers to modern nightlife, and "Universal Race", which uses space travel as a metaphor for sexual intercourse.

A limited edition of the album contains the cover of "You Keep Me Hangin' On" as bonus track. The song was originally a hit by The Supremes and was also made famous by Vanilla Fudge and Kim Wilde.

The cover art was designed by Thomas Ewerhard, who also made the covers for the next two albums by the band, Storm and Forever Is the World.

Metal Mind Productions reissued the album on 27 July 2009. The album has been digitally remastered using 24-bit process on a golden disc and includes three bonus tracks, "You Keep Me Hangin' On", "Let You Down" (Remix) and "Motion" (Funker Vogt Remix). The album is limited to 2,000 copies.

== Track listing ==
All songs written and composed by Theatre of Tragedy, except for "You Keep Me Hanging On" by Holland–Dozier–Holland.

No.	Title	Length
1.	"Automatic Lover"	4:26
2.	"Universal Race"	3:30
3.	"Episode"	3:34
4.	"Play"	3:25
5.	"Superdrive"	3:48
6.	"Let You Down"	2:56
7.	"Starlit"	4:08
8.	"Envision"	3:59
9.	"Flickerlight"	3:46
10.	"Liquid Man"	4:16
11.	"Motion"	4:41
Total length:		42:29

Bonus track
No.	Title	Length
12.	"You Keep Me Hanging On" (The Supremes cover)	3:59
Total length:		46:28

== Personnel ==
Theatre of Tragedy

- Raymond I. Rohonyi - vocals, programming
- Liv Kristine Espenæs - vocals
- Frank Claussen - guitars
- Vegard K. Thorsen - guitars
- Lorentz Aspen - keyboards
- Hein Frode Hansen - drums

Production

- Hiili Hiilesmaa - producer, engineer, mixing at Finnvox Studios
- Jukka Puurula - engineer
- Mika Jussila - mastering

== Singles ==
Two singles were released from this record.

1. "Envision" was released in 2002. As well as the title track the disc featured the Conetik Remix, the album version of "Superdrive", and The Supremes cover "You Keep Me Hangin' On".
2. "Let You Down" was also released in 2002. This disc contains (as well as the title track) a Rico Darum & Superdead remix of "Let You Down".

== Charts ==
Chart (2002)	Peak position
German Albums Chart	75
