= Anguish Force =

Italian heavy metal band

Anguish Force is an Italian heavy metal band.

The band was formed in 1995. Their eponoymous debut album was self-released in 2004. Later that year, Anguish Force recruited Evenfall guitarist Ivan Dalia.

Anguish Force received moderate to negative reviews. Rock Hard only gave 4.5 out of 10 points, whereas Metal.de gave 6 out of 10 points, reckoning: "For the most part, this mix of catchy melodies, galloping riffs, and Tommy Grotto's genuinely pleasant vocals is quite entertaining and occasionally even invites you to hum along. However, after the third listen, the songwriting lack of originality becomes glaringly obvious". Norway's Scream Magazine gave 3 out of 6, stating that it sounded like a demo recorded in less than two days. There were a couple of "cool songs", but the rest was not up to par, with lyrics that descended to "ludicrous".

Scream also reviewed the next albums 2: City of Ice and III: Invincible Imperium Italicum, which got 2 and 3 points respectively. City of Ice suffered from the same amateurism as their debut, with the lyrics and vocals being terrible. Better sound, a "vocalist who can actually sing" and more work on the lyrics would make the band "listenable". After a promising start to the third album, Anguish Force began running out of ideas. "Production-wise, the disk is no pearl", and the band would benefit from more outside help.

Their first EP Defenders United came out in 2006. Metal.de praised the opening track, but deeemed the rest of the EP pointless.

Sea Eternally Infested (2014) was followed by the EP Shark Attack, both of which were criticized by Metal.de. The album got a 4 of 10 rating, with the reviewer finding "one or two hits", since Sea Eternally Infested was "a very solid album" on the "instrumental level". The vocals and production were not good, however, and that "quickly ruins any enjoyment of the 13 tracks, which is a real shame". Shark Attack got a 1 of 10 rating, stating that Anguish Force had "definitely learned nothing" from their extensive career so far. "What's on offer are generic, lifeless riffs that drift aimlessly in the speed metal pond, never once eliciting a response, and a new singer, Kinnall, who should seriously reconsider his career choice. Great melodies, unfortunately, also require a minimum level of talent. [...] Add to that the poor production quality, even for a self-release, and you're left with nothing that could be recommended".

Metal Temple gave 5 of 10 points to Chapter 7 (2018), whereas The W8 of the Future (2022) and Novum Ordinem Vetus Emblem (2023) was better rated.

== Discography ==
Studio albums

- Anguish Force (2003)
- 2: City of Ice (2005)
- III: Invincible Imperium Italicum (2008)
- Created 4 Self-Destruction (2009)
- Atzwang (2012)
- Sea Eternally Infested (2014)
- Chapter 7 (2018)
- The W8 of the Future (2022)
- Novum Ordinem Vetus Emblem (2023)
- Ten Reasons to Die (2024)
