= Ghosts 'n' Stuff =

2008 single by Deadmau5

- Cover art for the version featuring Rob Swire

Single by Deadmau5 featuring Rob Swire

from the album For Lack of a Better Name
- Released: October 27, 2008
- Genre: Electro house; complextro
- Length: 6:10 (original mix); 5:27 (album version); 3:11 (radio edit)
- Label: Mau5trap; Ultra
- Songwriters: Rob Swire; Joel Zimmerman
- Producer: Joel Zimmerman

Deadmau5 singles chronology
"I Remember" (2008)	"Ghosts 'n' Stuff" (2008)	"Strobe" (2009)

Music video
- "Ghosts 'n' Stuff" on YouTube

"Ghosts 'n' Stuff" is an electro house song by Canadian electronic music producer Deadmau5 featuring vocals by Australian producer and Pendulum frontman Rob Swire. Its instrumental was released as a single on October 27, 2008, and re-released with vocals on September 27, 2009. The latter was featured on Deadmau5's fourth studio album For Lack of a Better Name.

== Background ==
The original version of "Ghosts 'n' Stuff" was made in 2004; Joel Zimmerman (Deadmau5) has stated that it "ended up going through at least 10 revisions". Zimmerman and Rob Swire had been coincidentally meeting each other backstage at various festivals and agreed to collaborate. The vocal melodies performed by Swire were inspired by Chris Isaak's song "Wicked Game". The song was made originally specifically for Pete Tong's BBC Radio 1 Essential Selection show on October 10, 2008. Deadmau5 was a guest on the show along with Steve Angello. The two, with Tong, were playing a live set in Manchester, England on that night. Deadmau5 debuted the song to a live audience at the HARD Haunted Mansion 2008 in Los Angeles, California.

The "hard intro" version of one B-side of the single, "Moar Ghosts 'n' Stuff" (which appears on the mixed version of For Lack of a Better Name) features a new intro containing a vocal sample from the 1957 film The Brain from Planet Arous and a quote of the funeral march by Chopin. This version of the track also contains a new lead melody which Deadmau5 has said was inspired by the main melody of Stevie Wonder's Superstition. The unmixed version released on October 20, 2009 replaces this version with the original mix, which excludes the vocal sample and the funeral march intro.

== Music video ==
A still from the music video showing Deadmau5 as a ghost

A music video promoting the single was released in August 2009. It was shot in Toronto, Ontario and directed by Colin O'Toole.

The video begins with Joel Zimmerman being rushed into a hospital, before dying within minutes of arrival. He is then revived as a ghost, and attempts to pass through the walls but cannot. He leaves the hospital and wanders around town, getting a tattoo of a Space Invader alien and running into a gang of other ghosts. After an unpleasant trip to a restaurant and a laundromat, Joel attends a rave with several people also dressed in costumes. At the party, someone wearing a mau5head pulls the white sheet off, as Joel is revived back in the hospital. He finds the Space Invader tattoo which he got as a ghost remaining on his neck.

The music video was uploaded to Ultra Music's YouTube channel on August 19, 2009; it has since acquired over 62 million views.

== Release ==
The song's instrumental was released as a single through Mau5trap and Ultra on October 27, 2008, as a digital download single and 12" vinyl with its B-side "Peddler of Misery". The vocal edit featuring Rob Swire was released as a digital download single and EP on September 27, 2009. Another vinyl version was released in 2009, with the original instrumental mix and "Moar Ghosts 'n' Stuff".

The song peaked at number 12 in the United Kingdom on the UK Singles Chart week beginning October 4, 2009. It also placed at number 96 in the Triple J Hottest 100, 2009. In the United States, "Ghosts 'n' Stuff" received exposure from use in TV shows such as America's Best Dance Crew and heavy radio airplay. In the May 15, 2010 issue of Billboard, the track reached number one on the magazine's Hot Dance Airplay chart after 24 weeks of charting, thus making the single the longest climb to number one ever on the chart, as well as the first single to reach the top spot after it had dropped off, then returned to the chart.

== Track listings ==
Digital download
No.	Title	Length
1.	"Ghosts 'n' Stuff"	6:10

Digital download – EP
No.	Title	Length
1.	"Ghosts 'n' Stuff" (radio edit, featuring Rob Swire)	3:11
2.	"Ghosts 'n' Stuff" (featuring Rob Swire)	5:28
3.	"Ghosts 'n' Stuff" (Nero remix)	6:55
4.	"Ghosts 'n' Stuff" (original instrumental mix)	6:10
5.	"Moar Ghosts 'n' Stuff"	4:58

Digital download – Sub Focus remix
No.	Title	Length
1.	"Ghosts 'n' Stuff" (Sub Focus remix)	4:26

Vinyl (2008)
No.	Title	Length
1.	"Ghosts 'n' Stuff"	6:16
2.	"Peddler of Misery"	7:37

Vinyl (2009)
No.	Title	Length
1.	"Ghosts 'n' Stuff" (featuring Rob Swire)	5:27
2.	"Moar Ghosts 'n' Stuff"	4:57
3.	"Ghosts 'n' Stuff" (original instrumental mix)	6:16

== Charts ==
=== Weekly charts ===
Chart (2009–2010)	Peak position
Canada Hot 100 (Billboard)	53
Canada CHR/Top 40 (Billboard)	34
Canada Hot AC (Billboard)	41
Canadian Digital Song Sales (Billboard)	56
European Hot 100 Singles (Billboard)	41
Scottish Singles Sales (Official Charts)	15
UK Singles (Official Charts)	12
UK Dance (Official Charts)	2
US Dance/Electronic Digital Songs (Billboard)	6
US Dance/Electronic Streaming Songs (Billboard)	24
US Dance Airplay (Billboard)	1
US Heatseekers Songs (Billboard)	24

=== Year-end charts ===
Chart (2010)	Position
US Dance/Mix Show Airplay (Billboard)	8
US Dance/Electronic Digital Songs (Billboard)	18

== Certifications ==
Certifications for "Ghosts 'n' Stuff"
Region	Certification	Certified units/sales
Canada (Music Canada)	3× Platinum	240,000^{*}
New Zealand (RMNZ)	Gold	15,000^{‡}
United Kingdom (BPI) featuring Rob Swire	Gold	400,000^{‡}
United States (RIAA)	2× Platinum	2,000,000^{‡}
United States (RIAA) featuring Rob Swire	Gold	500,000^{*}
^{*} Sales figures based on certification alone.^{‡} Sales+streaming figures based on certification alone.
