= Forever Is the World =

Studio album by Theatre of Tragedy
- Released: 18 September 2009
- Recorded: Room 13 Studios, Oslo and Suksesslaboratoriet, Stavanger, Norway, May–June 2009
- Genre: Gothic metal
- Length: 49:01
- Label: AFM
- Producer: Alexander Møklebust and Theatre of Tragedy

Theatre of Tragedy chronology
Storm (2006)	Forever Is the World (2009)	Last Curtain Call (2011)

Professional ratings
Review scores
Source	Rating
Allmusic	3.5/5 stars
USA Progressive Music	9/10 stars
Blistering	8/10 stars
Femme Metal	8/10 stars
Reflections Of Darkness	(positive)
Metal Storm	(7.9/10)
Metal Underground	2/5 stars
About.com	3/5 stars
Metal Temple	6/10 stars

Forever Is the World is the seventh and final studio album by the Norwegian gothic metal band Theatre of Tragedy. It was released on 18 September 2009, on AFM Records. The album was produced by the Zeromancer singer Alexander Møklebust and mastered by Bjørn Engelmann.

The cover art was designed by Thomas Ewerhard, who made the covers for the previous two albums by the band, Storm and Assembly. When the cover art was revealed on the band's website, they said that it had been designed to incorporate elements from the covers of all of their previous studio albums as a challenge to their most diehard fans.

Since the release of the record there have been complaints about the mixing and mastering of the album with claims of fuzzing and clipping. The album has been linked by fans to the loudness war.

== Track listing ==
All tracks are written by Theatre of Tragedy.

No.	Title	Length
1.	"Hide and Seek"	5:24
2.	"A Nine Days Wonder"	5:17
3.	"Revolution"	4:04
4.	"Transition"	4:59
5.	"Hollow"	6:10
6.	"Astray"	3:42
7.	"Frozen"	5:20
8.	"Empty" (limited digi-book bonus track)	4:03
9.	"Illusions"	4:45
10.	"Deadland"	4:40
11.	"Forever Is the World"	4:40

Japanese edition bonus track
No.	Title	Length
12.	"The Breaking"	4:26

== Personnel ==
=== Theatre of Tragedy ===
- Nell Sigland – vocals
- Raymond István Rohonyi – programming, vocals
- Frank Claussen – guitar
- Vegard K. Thorsen – guitar
- Lorentz Aspen – keyboards
- Hein Frode Hansen – drums

=== Additional musicians ===
- Magnus Westgaard – bass guitar

=== Production ===
- Alexander Møklebust – producer, engineer, mixing
- Mads Storkersen, Aleksander Nyhus - engineers
- Pzy-clone - drum editing & additional string arrangements
- Kristian Sigland - additional writing and arrangements on tracks 1, 3 and 7
- Björn Engelmann – mastering at Cutting Room, Sweden
- Thomas Ewerhard – cover art
