= Teenage Monster =

1957 film

- Theatrical release poster
- Directed by: Jacques R. Marquette
- Written by: Ray Buffum
- Produced by: Jacques R. Marquette; Dale Tate
- Starring: Anne Gwynne; Stuart Wade
- Cinematography: Taylor Byars
- Edited by: Irving M. Schoenberg
- Music by: Walter Greene
- Production company: Marquette Productions Limited
- Distributed by: Howco
- Release date: December 26, 1957 (US)
- Running time: 65 minutes
- Country: United States
- Language: English
- Budget: $57,000 (estimated)

Trailer.

Teenage Monster is a 1957 American independently made science fiction-horror Western film. It was produced and directed by Jacques R. Marquette, and stars Anne Gwynne and Stuart Wade. The film had a first screening on December 25, 1957 in Los Angeles. It was released on December 26, 1957 by Howco International on a double feature with The Brain from Planet Arous (1957).

== Plot ==
In 1880, in a town in the Southwestern United States, young Charlie Cannon and his gold prospector father see a meteorite crash in the desert. At the crash site, Charlie's father is killed, and Charlie is exposed to mysterious rays emanating from the meteorite that cause him to begin aging rapidly. His mother, Ruth, hides him and the town believes him dead.

Seven years later, Charlie has grown and aged abnormally, becoming a hairy, aggressive, man-beast. He sometimes escapes his confinement, and terrorizes the community. After his mother strikes gold, she purchases a house in town in the hopes that living in a real home will soothe her son's inner beast. However, he scares more people and kidnaps a young woman, Kathy, after killing her abusive boyfriend.

Ruth pays Kathy to keep her silence, but Kathy begins to blackmail Ruth and to manipulate Charlie to kill for her. In the final showdown, Charlie understands Kathy's lies and hurls her off a cliff before being shot and killed himself.

== Cast ==
The cast includes:

- Anne Gwynne as Ruth Cannon
- Stuart Wade as Sheriff Bob
- Gloria Castillo as Kathy North
- Charles Courtney as Marv Howell
- Gilbert Perkins as adult Charlie Cannon / The Monster
- Stephen Parker as young Charlie Cannon
- Norman Leavitt as Deputy Ed
- Jim McCullough as Jim Cannon
- Gaybe Morradian / Gabe Mooradian as Fred Fox
- Frank Davis as Man on the street
- Arthur Berkeley as Man with burro

== Production ==
Jacques R. Marquette made the feature because his company needed a cheap film to run as a double bill with The Brain from Planet Arous (1957). Jacques Marquette also helped develop the film's plot and handled some of the cinematography. Jack Pierce handled the make-up effects.

== Release ==
Teenage Monster was released on December 26, 1957 by Howco on a double bill with The Brain from Planet Arous (1957). The film's working title was originally to be Monster on the Hill. When the film was released to television, the title was changed to Meteor Monster.

== Reception ==
Variety wrote: "This is a silly nonsense, an unworthy companion to the film with which it is being packaged (The Brain From Planet Arous)."

Writing in DVD Savant, film critic Glenn Erickson reported that the "film is so primitive that none of the ugly subtext seems to matter," that "Marquette's action direction is terrible," and that "[i]mpossible characters defeat the actors."
