= Storm (Theatre of Tragedy album) =

Studio album by Theatre of Tragedy
- Released: 24 March 2006
- Recorded: Toproom Studio, Elektrostal Studio and Fagerborg Studios, Oslo, Norway
- Genre: Gothic metal
- Length: 43:55
- Label: AFM
- Producer: Rico Darum and Theatre of Tragedy

Theatre of Tragedy chronology
Assembly (2002)	Storm (2006)	Forever Is the World (2009)

Professional ratings
Review scores
Source	Rating
AllMusic	3.5/5 stars
Metal Storm	7/10 stars
About.com	2.5/5 stars
Sea of Tranquility	2.5/5 stars 4/5 stars

Storm is the sixth studio album by the Norwegian gothic metal band Theatre of Tragedy, released in March 2006. It is the band's first album with a new lead singer Nell Sigland. The song "Storm" was released as the album's only single. The album shows something of a return to gothic metal, although its sound is much lighter and more upbeat than that of earlier albums and it still uses modern English lyrics. The band embarked on a European tour to support the release.

The cover art was designed by Thomas Ewerhard, who also made the covers for Assembly and Forever Is the World.

The song "Senseless" was originally titled "Seven", as it is written in septuple meter and is the seventh track on the album.

== Track listing ==
No.	Title	Length
1.	"Storm"	3:46
2.	"Silence"	3:47
3.	"Ashes and Dreams"	4:06
4.	"Voices"	3:30
5.	"Fade"	5:58
6.	"Begin and End"	4:27
7.	"Highlights" (limited edition bonus track)	4:00
8.	"Senseless"	4:33
9.	"Exile"	4:02
10.	"Disintegration"	4:48
11.	"Debris"	5:03
12.	"Beauty of Deconstruction" (limited edition bonus track)	4:57
13.	"Storm (Tornado Mix)" (limited edition bonus track)	5:23

== Personnel ==
=== Theatre of Tragedy ===
- Nell Sigland – vocals
- Raymond István Rohonyi – vocals
- Frank Claussen – guitars
- Vegard K. Thorsen – guitars
- Lorentz Aspen – keyboards and piano
- Hein Frode Hansen – drums

=== Additional musicians ===
- Magnus Westgaard – bass guitar
- Sareeta – violin
- Rico Darum - additional programming and guitars

=== Production ===
- Rico Darum – producer, engineer and editing
- Børge Finstad – assistant engineer
- Greg Reely – mixing and mastering at The Green Jacket, Canada
- Peter Keller - additional arrangements and production on track 1
- Emile M. Ashley – photography
- Thomas Ewerhard – cover art and artwork
