= Evenfall (band) =

Italian gothic metal band

Evenfall was an Italian gothic metal band. They released two albums on Century Media Records.

Following an EP titled Evenfall, the group released their debut album Still in the Grey Dying in 1999. Rock Hard only gave 3 out of 10 points, whereas Vampster was a bit more positive. The album contained some "good songwriting" and was "well played" by "skilled musicians", but the lead guitar especially was out of tune, sometimes "borderline unbearably out of tune". The vocalist also received criticism, his "screaming unfortunately sometimes sounds very much like a whimpering baby".

Cumbersome came out in 2002, following lineup changes, most notably the addition of Roberta Staccuneddu as a female vocalist alongside the male vocalist Ansgar Zöschg. Metal.de gave 6 out of 10 points, reasoning that the album was mostly worth a shrug, and "will sink in the ocean of new releases because it offers nothing particularly remarkable". Vampster criticized the band for being split between styles and seeming "too divided on which direction they want to take". Soundi also gave a moderate score, 3 out of 5; Cumbersome was never bad, but "a slightly uneven entity", since Evenfall had not "completely gotten rid of all its childhood diseases".

According to Powermetal.de, Cumbersome was a "successful album" with "something for most fans", and was recommended for fans of Theatre of Tragedy. Rock Hard was much more positive this time, grading Cumbersome with 8 points out of 10.
