= Closure: Live =

Live album by Theatre of Tragedy
- Released: 28 May 2001
- Recorded: 29 April 2000
- Venue: MetalMania festival in Katowice, Poland
- Genre: Gothic metal, death-doom
- Length: 54:18
- Label: Massacre

Theatre of Tragedy chronology
Musique (2000)	Closure: Live (2001)	Assembly (2002)

Closure: Live is a 2001 album by the Norwegian gothic metal band Theatre of Tragedy. Recorded live at the Metalmania festival in Katowice 2000, the CD has ten audio tracks and, on special editions, two multimedia video tracks.

== Track listing ==
1. "Intro/And When He Falleth" - 7:41
2. "Der Spiegel" - 5:04
3. "Cassandra" - 3:46
4. "Venus" - 4:49
5. "Black as the Devil Painteth" (Remix 2) 4:48
6. "Siren" - 6:10
7. "Poppæa" - 5:16
8. "Bacchante" - 5:51
9. "A Distance There Is" - 5:12
10. "Der Tanz Der Schatten" - 5:40

=== Videos ===
- "Cassandra"
- "Der Tanz Der Schatten"

== Personnel ==
Theatre of Tragedy

- Raymond Rohonyi - vocals
- Liv Kristine Espenæs - vocals
- Frank Claussen - guitars
- Vegard K. Thorsen - guitars
- Lorentz Aspen - keyboards
- Hein Frode Hansen - drums

Production

- Siggi Bemm, Matthias Klinkman - mixing at Woodhouse Studios
