= Vain City Chronicles =

Studio album by The Crest
- Released: May 17, 2005
- Genre: Gothic rock
- Length: 45:12
- Label: Season of Mist
- Producer: Kristian Sigland

The Crest chronology
Letters from Fire (2002)	Vain City Chronicles (2005)

Vain City Chronicles is the second album release by Norwegian gothic metal band The Crest. The album was recorded in November 2004 at Top Room Studio and produced by Kristian Sigland. The album was released on May 17, 2005.

A videoclip was made for "Run Like Blazes" featuring the band performing in a 1930s club before lead singer Nell Sigland tries to flee with the cash. The other band members eventually catch and shoot her, leaving her to bleed to death on a street.

The Spanish lyrics on "Reptile" are from a poem of Uruguayan poet Roberto Genta and recorded by a Spanish actor. Track #11 "My War / Broken Glass" features an acoustic reprise of track #2 "My War".

== Track listing ==
1. "Run Like Blazes"
2. "My War"
3. "Silent"
4. "Another Life"
5. "Come on Down"
6. "Flavour of the Day"
7. "Reptile"
8. "New Profound Fear"
9. "Imaginary Friend"
10. "House of Mirrors"
11. "My War / Broken Glass"

== Personnel ==
- Nell Sigland – vocals, keyboards
- Kristian Sigland – guitars, vocals, keyboards, programming
- Magnus Westgaard – bass, vocals
- Sebastian Aarebrot – guitars
- Klaus Blomvik – drums
