= Nell Sigland =

Norwegian singer (born 1976)

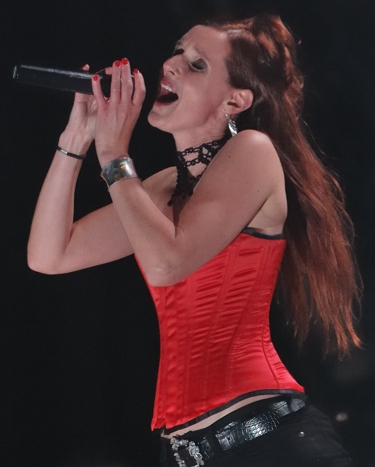
- Sigland in 2010

Background information
- Also known as: Nell Sigland
- Born: Ragnhild Westgaard; 13 November 1976 (age 48); Hamar, Norway
- Genres: Classical, jazz, gothic rock, gothic metal
- Occupation: Singer
- Years active: 1996–present
- Labels: AFM Records, Season of Mist

Ragnhild Westgaard (born 13 November 1976), or often referred to as Nell Sigland, is a Norwegian singer from Hamar, best known as the lead vocalist of Norwegian gothic metal band Theatre of Tragedy from 2004 to 2010. She was also the lead singer for Norwegian gothic rock band The Crest for ten years, from 1996 until the end of 2005, founded by her then-husband Kristian Sigland and herself.

== Discography ==
=== The Crest ===
Demos:

- Straightjacket Singalongs (1998)
- Childhood's End/Thorn (1999)
- Thunderfuel (1999)
- Dark Rock Armada (2000)

Albums:

- Letters from Fire (2002)
- Vain City Chronicles (2005)

=== Theatre of Tragedy ===
Albums:

- Storm (2006)
- Forever Is the World (2009)

Singles:

- Storm (2006)
- Deadland (2009)

EPs:

- Addenda (2010)

DVDs:

- Last Curtain Call (2011) (also live album)

=== Hollow Peak ===
EPs:

- Endless (2023)

=== Guest appearances ===
- Gothminister – Gothic Electronic Anthems (2003) – vocals in the songs "Hatred" and "Wish"
- Gothminister – Happiness in Darkness (2008) – vocals in the songs "Your Saviour", "The Allmighty" and "Emperor"
- Dark Tranquillity – Fiction (2007) – co-vocals on "The Mundane and the Magic"
- Dark Tranquillity – Where Death Is Most Alive DVD (2009) – co-vocals on "The Mundane and the Magic" and "Insanity's Crescendo"
- Alight – Don't Fear the Revenge (2009) – vocals in the song "Your Bride"
