= We Are the Void =

Studio album by Dark Tranquillity
- Released: 24 February 2010
- Recorded: 28 August – 14 October 2009
- Genre: Melodic death metal
- Length: 47:45
- Label: Century Media
- Producer: Dark Tranquillity

Dark Tranquillity chronology
Fiction (2007)	We Are the Void (2010)	Construct (2013)

We Are the Void is the ninth studio album by Swedish melodic death metal band Dark Tranquillity. It is their first and only album with bassist Daniel Antonsson, who joined in 2008 and left in 2013.

The band began writing for this album in late 2008 (except for the majority of "Iridium" which was written sometime between 1996 and 1998 but was left out until this album). Stylistically, it is similar to their previous album Fiction; the band used the same Drop B tuning as well as clean melodic vocals that were re-introduced on Fiction.

The band also began to release songs from this album on their MySpace page starting with "Dream Oblivion" on 21 December 2009, "At the Point of Ignition" on 14 January 2010 and finally the entire album was available for free streaming on 19 February 2010.

Music videos were released for "Shadow in Our Blood" on 10 February 2010 and "In My Absence" on 22 February 2012.

== Reception ==
Professional ratings
Review scores
Source	Rating
Allmusic	4.5/5 stars

Kyle Ward of Sputnikmusic, described the album:

"If you take Fiction, cut out the awesome guitar riffs, increase the keyboard presence tenfold, and then make it more depressed-sounding, you will have exactly what We Are The Void delivers."

Metal Underground said that the album is "Excellent melodic death metal, but it feels like Dark Tranquillity has released the same album three times in a row now."

== Track listing ==
All lyrics are written by Mikael Stanne, except where noted.

Original release
No.	Title	Lyrics	Music	Length
1.	"Shadow in Our Blood"		Sundin	3:46
2.	"Dream Oblivion"		Antonsson; Henriksson	3:50
3.	"The Fatalist"		Henriksson; Jivarp	4:33
4.	"In My Absence"		Brändström; Henriksson; Sundin	4:47
5.	"The Grandest Accusation"		Sundin; Henriksson; Brändström; Jivarp	4:55
6.	"At the Point of Ignition"		Sundin; Henriksson	3:53
7.	"Her Silent Language"		Sundin; Jivarp; Henriksson	3:33
8.	"Arkhangelsk"	Sundin; Stanne	Sundin	3:56
9.	"I Am the Void"		Sundin; Henriksson; Jivarp	3:59
10.	"Surface the Infinite"		Henriksson; Jivarp; Brändström	3:50
11.	"Iridium"	Sundin; Stanne	Sundin; Brändström	6:43
Total length:				47:45

Limited edition bonus tracks
No.	Title	Lyrics	Music	Length
12.	"Star of Nothingness"	Instrumental	Sundin	2:12
13.	"To Where Fires Cannot Feed"	Stanne	Sundin	3:52
Total length:				47:45

Japanese edition bonus tracks
No.	Title	Lyrics	Music	Length
12.	"Star of Nothingness"	Instrumental	Sundin	2:12
13.	"Out of Gravity"	Stanne	Henriksson; Jivarp; Sundin	4:40
Total length:				54:32

iTunes bonus tracks
No.	Title	Lyrics	Music	Length
12.	"The Bow and the Arrow"	Stanne	Sundin; Jivarp; Henriksson	3:55

Tour edition bonus tracks
No.	Title	Lyrics	Music	Length
12.	"Zero Distance"	Stanne	Jivarp; Henriksson	4:02
13.	"Out of Gravity"	Stanne	Henriksson; Jivarp; Sundin	4:40
14.	"Star of Nothingness"	Instrumental	Sundin	2:12
15.	"To Where Fires Cannot Feed"	Stanne	Sundin	3:52
16.	"The Bow and the Arrow"	Stanne	Sundin; Jivarp; Henriksson	3:55

Tour edition DVD
No.	Title	Length
1.	"Shadow in Our Blood" (Videoclip)
2.	"Dream Oblivion" (Live at With Full Force, 2010)
3.	"The Fatalist" (Live in London, 2010)
4.	"The Grandest Accusation" (Videoclip)
5.	"Iridium" (Live at Summer Breeze Open Air, 2010)
6.	"Iridium" (Videoclip)
7.	"Zero Distance" (Videoclip)

== Inside The Void DVD ==
No.	Title	Length
1.	"Studio Report 2009 – The Making of the Void"	38:27
2.	"Making Of Shadow in Our Blood Video"	3:04
3.	"Where Death Is Most Alive DVD Trailer"	2:18
4.	"ThereIn (Live in Milan)"	6:31
5.	"Final Resistance (Live in Milan)"	4:00

== Personnel ==
=== Dark Tranquillity ===
- Mikael Stanne – vocals, lyrics
- Martin Henriksson – guitars, sound recording
- Niklas Sundin – guitars, album artwork
- Anders Jivarp – drums
- Martin Brändström – electronics, engineering
- Daniel Antonsson – bass guitar, guitar solo (on "Shadow in Our Blood" (1st part) and "At the Point of Ignition"), engineering

=== Guests ===
- Tue Madsen – mixing (October–November 2009) & mastering (Antfarm Studio in Århus)
- Anders Björler – filmed "Studio Report 2009"
- Hasse Kosonen – engineering
- Daniel Antonsson – engineering
- Stefan Wibbeke – artwork
- Katja Kuhl – band photo
