= Der Tanz der Schatten =

Single by Theatre of Tragedy

from the album Velvet Darkness They Fear
- Released: September 16, 1996
- Recorded: Commusication Studio, Germany - Unisound, Sweden
- Genre: Gothic metal • death-doom
- Length: 20:12
- Label: Massacre
- Songwriter: Raymond Istvàn Rohonyi
- Producer: Pete Coleman

Theatre of Tragedy singles chronology
"Der Tanz der Schatten" (1996)	"Cassandra" (1998)

"Der Tanz der Schatten" is a 1996 single by Theatre of Tragedy. The title translates to "The Dance of the Shadows."

== History ==
The single was released on September 16, 1996. It was the only single to be released from the album Velvet Darkness They Fear.

== Track listing ==
1. "Der Tanz der Schatten (Club Mix)" - 5:13
2. "Black as the Devil Painteth" - 5:26
3. "A Hamlet for a Slothful Vassal" - 4:05
4. "Der Tanz der Schatten (Album Version)" - 5:28
