= Lorentz Aspen =

Norwegian musician (born 1978)

- Born: 23 April 1978 (age 47); Stavanger, Norway

Lorentz Aspen (born 23 April 1978 in Stavanger) is a Norwegian heavy metal pianist and keyboardist. He played in Theatre of Tragedy from 2 October 1993 to 2 October 2010 and with them he released seven studio albums, one live album and five EP's. He also played in Imperium as an additional musician, and he played the hammond organ on Therion's Vovin.

== Discography ==
=== With Theatre of Tragedy ===
- Theatre of Tragedy - Demo (1994)
- Theatre of Tragedy (1995)
- Velvet Darkness They Fear (1996)
- A Rose for the Dead - EP (1997)
- Aégis (1998)
- Musique (2000)
- Closure: Live - Live (2001)
- Inperspective - Compilation EP (2001)
- Assembly (2002)
- Two Originals - Compilation (2003)
- Storm (2006)
- Forever Is the World (2009)
- Addenda - EP (2010)

==== Singles ====
- "Der Tanz der Schatten" (1996)
- "Cassandra" (1998)
- "Image" (2000)
- "Machine" (2001)
- "Let You Down" (2002)
- "Envision" (2002)
- "Storm" (2006)

=== With Imperium ===
- Imperium - EP (1996, re-released 2004)

=== With Therion ===
- Vovin (1998) - Hammond organ on "Draconian Trilogy"
