= Last Curtain Call =

Live album by Theatre of Tragedy
- Released: 2 May 2011
- Recorded: at Folken, Stavanger, Norway on 2 October 2010
- Genres: Gothic metal, death-doom
- Length: 94:38 (DVD); 81:39 (CD)
- Label: AFM Records

Theatre of Tragedy chronology
Forever Is the World (2009)	Last Curtain Call (2011)

Last Curtain Call is the final release & concert ever by Norwegian gothic metal band Theatre of Tragedy. It is released both as a DVD with an audio CD included and as a separate double album. It was recorded live in the band's hometown, 17 years to the day they formed. This release was only possible due to the after the label refused to cover all the expenses, forcing the band to resort to fundraising, which according to the band's site was €10,000 were given by the label, 10,000 Euros by the band itself and 4,000 Euros, with the help of fans.

The album version omits two performances that are present on the DVD release (Cassandra and Lorelei).

The DVD audio has two options: Dolby Digital AC-3 Stereo & AC-3 5.1.

== DVD Disc 1 Track listing ==
No.	Title	Note	Length
1.	"Hide and Seek"	^{Note 1}	5:31
2.	"Bring Forth Ye Shadow"	^{Note 2}	5:41
3.	"Lorelei"	^{Note 3}	5:04
4.	"Frozen"	^{Note 1}	5:21
5.	"Ashes and Dreams"	^{Note 4}	4:10
6.	"A Rose for the Dead"	^{Note 5}	5:15
7.	"Fragment"	^{Note 6}	3:52
8.	"And When He Falleth"	^{Note 2}	6:41
9.	"Venus"	^{Note 3}	4:52
10.	"Hollow"	^{Note 1}	6:29
11.	"Storm"	^{Note 4}	3:49
12.	"Image"	^{Note 6}	3:17
13.	"Cassandra"	^{Note 3}	3:55
14.	"A Hamlet for a Slothful Vassal"	^{Note 7}	4:21
15.	"Fade"	^{Note 4}	6:09
16.	"Machine"	^{Note 6}	4:58
17.	"Der Tanz der Schatten"	^{Note 2}	5:41
18.	"Forever Is the World"	^{Note 1}	5:32
19.	"Interviews"		36:36
20.	"The Last Tour (Backstage Outtakes)"		22:33
21.	"The Last Rehearsal (Final Rehearsal with Fans attending): I. A Rose for the Dead; II. Hide and Seek; III. And When He Falleth; IV. Ashes and Dreams"		21:10

=== Notes ===
1. from the album Forever Is the World
2. from the album Velvet Darkness They Fear
3. from the album Aégis
4. from the album Storm
5. from the EP A Rose for the Dead
6. from the album Musique
7. from their self-titled debut album and 1994 demo

No songs from Assembly were played in this concert.

Track 1, 3, 9 and 16 is published by Copyright COntrol Track 4, 6, 10, 11, 13 and 14 is published by Sylvian Music Gmbh Track 2, 5, 7, 8, 12 and 15 us published by Hanseatic Musikverlag Gmbh

=== DVD Disc 2 ===
No.	Title	Length
1.	"Hide and Seek"	5:31
2.	"Bring Forth Ye Shadow"	5:41
3.	"Ashes and Dreams"	4:10
4.	"A Rose for the Dead"	5:15
5.	"And When He Falleth"	6:41
6.	"Venus"	4:52
7.	"Hollow"	6:29
8.	"Storm"	3:49
9.	"Fade"	6:51
10.	"Forever Is the World"	5:28

== Live Album Track listing ==
Disc 1
No.	Title	Length
1.	"Hide and Seek"	5:31
2.	"Bring Forth Ye Shadow"	5:41
3.	"Frozen"	5:21
4.	"Ashes and Dreams"	4:10
5.	"A Rose for the Dead"	5:15
6.	"Fragment"	3:52
7.	"And When He Falleth"	6:41
8.	"Venus"	4:52
Total length:		41:23

Disc 2
No.	Title	Length
1.	"Hollow"	6:29
2.	"Storm"	3:49
3.	"Image"	3:17
4.	"A Hamlet for a Slothful Vassal"	4:21
5.	"Fade"	6:09
6.	"Machine"	4:58
7.	"Der Tanz der Schatten"	5:41
8.	"Forever Is the World"	5:32
Total length:		40:16

== Credits ==
=== Theatre of Tragedy ===
- Nell Sigland – vocals
- Raymond Istvàn Rohonyi – vocals
- Vegard K. Thorsen – guitar
- Frank Claussen – guitar
- Lorentz Aspen – keyboards
- Hein Frode Hansen – drums, production
- Erik Torp – session bass

=== Other Personnel ===
- Erlend Sørbø – editing, production, direction
- Aleksander Nyhus – editing, recording
- Lars Martin Kræmer – editing, production
- Lise Kvam – design, artwork
- Haakon Hoseth – cover art, design, layout
- Alexandre Mattioli – Rehearsal, video, photo
- Truls Espedal – cover art painting
- Chris Sansom – mastering (at Propeller Mastering)
- Mike Hartung – mastering
- Alex Møklebust – mixing
- Hauke Dressler – engineering

==== Photography ====
- GothicNarcissus
- Graham Hilling
- Werner SW
- João Pedro Vieira
- Soledad Garcia
