= Frank Claussen =

Norwegian guitar player (born 1976)

Frank Claussen (born 19 March 1976 in Stavanger) is a Norwegian heavy metal guitarist. From 1997 to 2010 he played in Theatre of Tragedy, and with them released six studio albums, a live album and several studio EP's.

== With Theatre of Tragedy ==
- Aégis (1998)
- Musique (2000)
- Closure: Live - Live (2001)
- Inperspective - Compilation EP (2001)
- Assembly (2002)
- Two Originals - Compilation (2003)
- Storm (2006)
- Forever Is the World(2009)
- Addenda-EP (2010)

=== Singles ===
- "Cassandra" (1998)
- "Image" (2000)
- "Machine" (2001)
- "Let You Down" (2002)
- "Envision" (2002)
- "Storm" (2006)
- "Addenda" (2010)
