= The Mind's I (album) =

Studio album by Dark Tranquillity
- Released: 21 April 1997
- Recorded: 1996
- Studio: Studio Fredman
- Genre: Melodic death metal
- Length: 46:34
- Label: Osmose
- Producer: Dark Tranquillity, Fredrik Nordström

Dark Tranquillity chronology
Enter Suicidal Angels (1996)	The Mind's I (1997)	Projector (1999)

Professional ratings
Review scores
Source	Rating
AllMusic	3/5 stars

The Mind's I is the third studio album by Swedish melodic death metal band Dark Tranquillity, released in 1997.

In 2004, The Mind's I was re-released under Osmose Productions and in 2005 by Century Media Records with new layouts, the four-song Enter Suicidal Angels EP, two live videos and the music video for the song "Hedon".

== Track listing ==
No.	Title	Lyrics	Music	Length
1.	"Dreamlore Degenerate"	Stanne	Henriksson, Sundin	2:44
2.	"Zodijackyl Light"	Stanne	Sundin, Johansson	3:59
3.	"Hedon"	Sundin	Henriksson, Sundin	5:37
4.	"Scythe, Rage and Roses"	Stanne	Henriksson	2:33
5.	"Constant"	Stanne	Sundin, Johansson	3:02
6.	"Dissolution Factor Red"	Sundin, Stanne	Johansson, Sundin	2:07
7.	"Insanity's Crescendo"	Stanne	Henriksson, Johansson, Sundin	6:52
8.	"Still Moving Sinews"	Sundin, Stanne	Sundin, Johansson	4:42
9.	"Atom Heart 243.5"	Sundin	Sundin, Johansson, Henriksson	4:00
10.	"Tidal Tantrum"	Stanne	Johansson	2:57
11.	"Tongues"	Sundin	Henriksson, Johansson, Sundin	4:53
12.	"The Mind's Eye"	(Instrumental)	Palm, Johansson	3:11
Total length:				46:34

Dream On Records Reissue (2000), Toy's Factory First Reissue (1997) & Second Reissue (2008), Osmose Productions Special "Deluxe" Edition (2004), Icarus Music Reissue (2005) and Century Media Reissue (2005)
No.	Title	Lyrics	Music	Length
13.	"Razorfever"	Stanne	Sundin, Jivarp	3:16
14.	"Shadowlit Façade"	Stanne	Johansson	3:25

Dream On Records Reissue (2000)
No.	Title	Length
15.	"Bringer of Torture" (Kreator cover)	2:20

Toy's Factory First Reissue (1997)
No.	Title	Lyrics	Music	Length
15.	"Archetype"	Stanne	Johansson, Nordström	4:29

Toy's Factory First Second Reissue (2008), Osmose Productions Special "Deluxe" Edition (2004), Icarus Music Reissue (2005) and Century Media Reissue (2005)
No.	Title	Lyrics	Music	Length
15.	"Archetype"	Stanne	Johansson, Nordström	4:29
16.	"Zodijackyl Light (Video)"	Stanne	Sundin, Johansson	3:59
17.	"Hedon (Video)"	Sundin	Henriksson, Sundin	5:37

== Credits ==
=== Dark Tranquillity ===
- Mikael Stanne − vocals
- Niklas Sundin − guitar
- Fredrik Johansson − guitar, acoustic guitar, drums (12)
- Martin Henriksson − bass, acoustic guitar
- Anders Jivarp − drums (1–11, 13–17)

=== Guests ===
- Michael Nicklasson - backing vocals on "Zodijackyl Light"
- Anders Fridén - co-vocals (Mantra) on "Hedon"
- Sara Svensson - co-vocals on "Insanity's Crescendo"
- Fredrik Nordström - keyboards
- Kenneth Johansson - cover art & band photography
- 前田岳彦 (Takehiko Maeda) - liner notes
