= Hein Frode Hansen =

Norwegian heavy metal drummer (born 1972)

- Born: Hein Frode Hansen; 25 March 1972 (age 54); Haugesund, Norway
- Genre: Heavy metal
- Occupations: Drummer, vocalist
- Years active: 1989–present
- Member of: The Black Locust Project
- Formerly of: Serpent, Phobia, Theatre of Tragedy

Hein Frode Hansen (born 25 March 1972 in Haugesund) is a Norwegian heavy metal drummer. He was the original vocalist of the power metal band Serpent, formed in 1989. In 1990 he started playing drums in the death metal band Phobia. Both bands broke up in 1991. From 1993-2010 he co-founded and played in Theatre of Tragedy, and with them released seven studio albums, two live albums and several studio EP's. Hansen has started a new project with Kristian Sigland, called The Black Locust Project.

== Discography ==
=== With Serpent ===
- Have a Nice Day - Demo (1990)
- Promotion Tape 1991 - Demo (1991)

=== With Phobia ===
- Feverish Convulsions - Demo (1991)

=== With Theatre of Tragedy ===
- Theatre of Tragedy - Demo (1994)
- Theatre of Tragedy (1995)
- Velvet Darkness They Fear (1996)
- A Rose for the Dead - EP (1997)
- Aégis (1998)
- Musique (2000)
- Closure: Live - Live (2001)
- Inperspective - Compilation EP (2001)
- Assembly (2002)
- Two Originals - Compilation (2003)
- Storm (2006)
- Forever Is the World(2009)
- Addenda - EP (2010)
- Last Curtain Call - Live (2011)

==== Singles ====
- "Der Tanz der Schatten" (1996)
- "Cassandra" (1998)
- "Image" (2000)
- "Machine" (2001)
- "Let You Down" (2002)
- "Envision" (2002)
- "Storm" (2006)
- "Deadland" (2009)
