= Aégis (album) =

Studio album by Theatre of Tragedy
- Released: 18 August 1998
- Studio: Woodhouse Studio, Hagen, Germany
- Genre: Gothic metal; gothic rock
- Length: 49:45
- Language: Early Modern English, Latin
- Label: Massacre
- Producer: Peter "Pee Wee" Coleman

Theatre of Tragedy chronology
| A Rose for the Dead (1997) | Aégis (1998) | Virago (1999) |

Singles from Aégis
- 1. "Cassandra" Released: April 1998

Professional ratings
Review scores
| Source | Rating |
|---|---|
| AllMusic | 4/5 stars |
| Chronicles of Chaos | 5/10 |
| Collector's Guide to Heavy Metal | 7/10 |
| Rock Hard | 7.0/10 |
| Sputnikmusic | 4/5 |

Aégis is the third studio album by Norwegian gothic metal band Theatre of Tragedy, and the last album of their musical period defined by gothic stylings and Early Modern English lyrics.

== Music and lyrics ==
As with Theatre of Tragedy's previous albums, the lyrics are written in Early Modern English (except "Venus", in Latin) which sounds very different from modern English: Vaunt! - Devil tyne - Wadst thou wane fore'ermae? (from the song "Angélique"). The subject matter is drawn from a range of European folklore and history: Venus and Poppæa are from Roman sources; Aœde, Cassandra, Bacchante and Siren are drawn from Greek mythology; while Lorelei refers to a Nix from German stories, and Angélique is inspired by medieval poem Orlando Furioso.

== Track listing ==
| No. | Title | Length |
|---|---|---|
| 1. | "Cassandra" | 6:47 |
| 2. | "Lorelei" | 5:36 |
| 3. | "Angélique" | 5:45 |
| 4. | "Aœde" | 6:10 |
| 5. | "Siren" | 7:27 |
| 6. | "Venus" | 5:32 |
| 7. | "Poppæa" | 5:46 |
| 8. | "Bacchante" | 6:42 |
| Total length: | | 49:45 |

Japanese Limited Edition
| No. | Title | Length |
|---|---|---|
| 1. | "Cassandra" | 6:47 |
| 2. | "Lorelei" | 5:36 |
| 3. | "Angélique" | 5:45 |
| 4. | "Aœde" | 6:10 |
| 5. | "Siren" | 7:27 |
| 6. | "Samantha" | 4:12 |
| 7. | "Venus" | 5:32 |
| 8. | "Poppæa" | 5:46 |
| 9. | "Bacchante" | 6:42 |
| 10. | "Virago" | 5:19 |
| Total length: | | 59:16 |

== Personnel ==
Theatre of Tragedy

- Raymond Rohonyi - vocals
- Liv Kristine Espenæs - vocals
- Frank Claussen - guitars
- Tommy Olsson - guitars
- Lorentz Aspen - synthesizer
- Eirik T. Saltrø - bass
- Hein Frode Hansen - drums

== Singles ==
From this period there were 2 releases.

- "Cassandra" was the only single taken from the album and was released in April 1998. It was released in shorter version called "Cheap Wine Edit" and backed with "Aœde (Edit)"

== Charts ==
| Chart (1998) | Peak position |
|---|---|
| German Albums Chart | 40 |
