= Play Records =

- Founded: 1996
- Founder: Melleny Melody
- Genre: Various
- Country of origin: Canada
- Official website: https://www.playrecords.net

Play Records is an independently owned Canadian record label operating in Toronto, Ontario, Canada.

The company includes Play Deep Studios, a recording studio in the UK; Play Digital, for digital music and Play Records Publishing; and a publishing company which provides licensing materials for commercial, film and television productions, including licensing deals for compilations.

== History ==
Play Records was founded by singer and former Care Bears voice actress Melleny Melody and DJ Spydabrown in 1996.

In 2005, the company signed on electronic musician deadmau5. The company head Melleefresh discovered the artist when the two collaborated on some releases under the Play Records duo Freshmau5.

In 2008, two of the tracks in the company's catalog, "Afterhours" by Melleefresh and deadmau5 and "R My Dreams (All U Ever Want)" by deadmau5 and Billy Newton-Davis were nominated for a Juno Award under the category of Dance Recording of the Year, with the latter winning the award that year. That same year, Play Records parted ways with deadmau5 and the company gained ownership of the catalog of tracks deadmau5 produced during his time with Play Records as part of the agreement. In the following years, Play Records released five full albums of unreleased and/or remixed music by deadmau5. This was done without his direct involvement, with the most recent appearing in 2015.

In October 2015, Play Records was sued by deadmau5 in a multimillion-dollar lawsuit over a breach of contract for the tracks he had previously transferred ownership to.

The company reached agreement with deadmau5 in May 2016 which allowed Play Records to retain the rights to the tracks but prohibits the label from producing any new remixes derived from the original tracks. The first of these tracks to be re-released by Play Records was "Desynchronized", which appeared on Spotify on June 20, 2016. Neither deadmau5 nor mau5trap, his record label, publicised this release.
