= Letters from Fire =

Studio album by The Crest
- Released: 2002
- Genre: Gothic rock
- Length: 44:55
- Label: Season of Mist
- Producer: Terje Refsnes

The Crest chronology
Letters from Fire (2002)	Vain City Chronicles (2005)

Letters from Fire is the debut album of Norwegian gothic metal band The Crest. It mainly features re-worked songs from the band's previous demos.

== Track listing ==
1. "Fire Walk with Me"
2. "Butterflies & Dragons"
3. "Thorn"
4. "Never Sleep Again"
5. "Childhood's End"
6. "Pills for Broken Dreams"
7. "In This Cage"
8. "Triangle"
9. "Frozen Garden"
10. "Monument"
11. "Armada"

== Line up ==
- Nell Sigland - Vocals, keyboards
- Kristian Sigland - Guitars, vocals, keyboards, programming
- Magnus Westgaard - Bass, vocals
- Sebastian Aarebrot - Guitars
- Xander Sevon - Drums, drum programming
