= Velvet Darkness They Fear =

Studio album by Theatre of Tragedy
- Released: 18 August 1996
- Recorded: July 1996
- Studio: Commusication Studio, Beindersheim, Germany
- Genre: Gothic metal, death-doom, symphonic metal
- Length: 52:00
- Language: English, Early Modern English, German
- Label: Massacre
- Producer: Pete "Pee Wee" Coleman

Theatre of Tragedy chronology
Theatre of Tragedy (1995)	Velvet Darkness They Fear (1996)	A Rose for the Dead (1997)

Singles from Velvet Darkness They Fear
- 1. "Der Tanz der Schatten" Released: 16 September 1996

Professional ratings
Review scores
Source	Rating
AllMusic	3/5 stars
Chronicles of Chaos	9/10
Collector's Guide to Heavy Metal	6/10
Rock Hard	8.0/10

Velvet Darkness They Fear is the second studio album by the Norwegian gothic metal band Theatre of Tragedy. It was released in 1996 by Massacre Records. The album was issued in the US by Century Media Records in 1997.

In 2021, it was elected by Metal Hammer as the 14th best symphonic metal album of all time.

== Music ==
Velvet Darkness They Fear continued Theatre of Tragedy's particular brand of gothic metal, first heard in their first album, Theatre of Tragedy, defined by alternating and occasionally overlapping male death growls and sung female vocals. This style, which was copied later by many metal bands, is generally known as 'Beauty and the Beast'. Metal Hammer said the album employs "duetting angelic/demonic vocals."

Velvet Darkness They Fear also continued the use of Raymond Rohonyi's Early Modern English lyrics. "Der Tanz der Schatten", which is written in German, is the exception. The songs themselves rarely have a clear story, but death, undeath, demons and similar supernatural elements are all prominent. The lyrics to the songs are referred to within the sleeve notes as 'plays', 'poems' and one 'soliloquy', depending on the parts the singers play.

The fifth track, "And When He Falleth", includes a section of Jane Asher and Vincent Price's dialogue from the film The Masque of the Red Death.

The album sold over 125,000 copies.

== Track listing ==
All lyrics are written by Raymond Rohonyi, except "Der Tanz der Schatten" by Rohonyi, Gerhard Magin and Tilo Wolff; all music is composed by Theatre of Tragedy, except where indicated.

No.	Title	Music	Length
1.	"Velvet Darkness They Fear"		1:05
2.	"Fair and 'Guiling Copesmate Death"		7:05
3.	"Bring Forth Ye Shadow"	Theatre of Tragedy and Pål Bjåstad	6:49
4.	"Seraphic Deviltry"		5:09
5.	"And When He Falleth"	Theatre of Tragedy and Pål Bjåstad	7:09
6.	"Der Tanz der Schatten"	Theatre of Tragedy and Pål Bjåstad	5:27
7.	"Black as the Devil Painteth"		5:27
8.	"On Whom the Moon Doth Shine"		6:15
9.	"The Masquerader and Phoenix"		7:35
Total length:			52:00

== Personnel ==
Theatre of Tragedy

- Raymond Rohonyi - vocals
- Liv Kristine Espenæs - vocals
- Tommy Lindal - guitars
- Geir Flikkeid - guitars and e-bow
- Lorentz Aspen - piano, synthesizer, strings composition
- Eirik T. Saltrø - bass
- Hein Frode Hansen - drums

Additional musicians

- Streicherensemble Nedelfo Boiadjiev - strings

Production

- Pete Coleman - producer, engineer, mixing
- Gerhard Magin - engineer, mixing, mastering
- Klaus Wagenleiter - strings composition and arrangements, strings recording at MTS Albstadt
- Tom Krüger - strings recording
