= Theatre of Tragedy =

Norwegian band

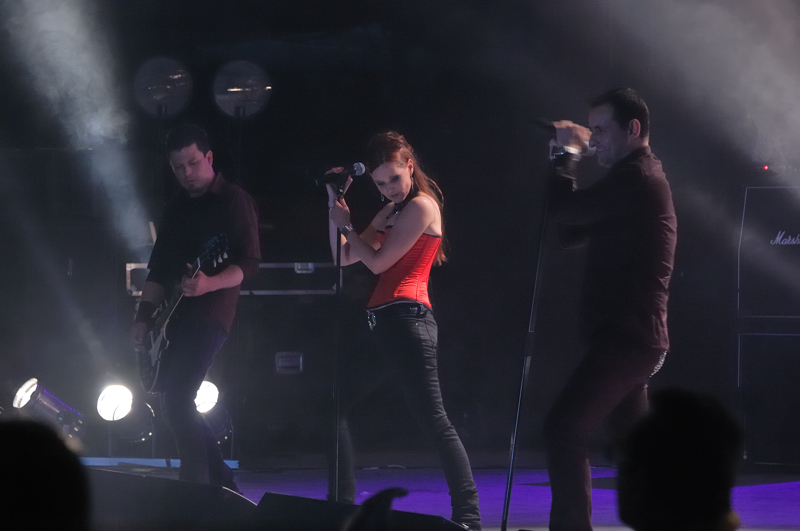
- Theatre of Tragedy at Teatro Teletón, Santiago, Chile, 2010

Background information
- Origin: Stavanger, Norway
- Genres: Gothic metal; death-doom; industrial rock; electropop
- Years active: 1993–2010
- Label: AFM/Candlelight (2006–2010) Nuclear Blast (2000–2005) Massacre/Century Media (1995–99)
- Spinoffs: Leaves' Eyes
- Past members: Raymond Rohonyi; Tommy Lindal; Pål Bjåstad; Hein Frode Hansen; Eirik T. Saltrø; Lorentz Aspen; Liv Kristine; Geir Flikkeid; Frank Claussen; Tommy Olsson; Vegard K. Thorsen; Nell Sigland
- Website: theatreoftragedy.com

Theatre of Tragedy was a Norwegian band from Stavanger, active between 1993 and 2010. They are best known for their earlier albums, which influenced the gothic metal genre.

== History ==
=== Formation (1993) ===
Theatre of Tragedy was founded on 2 October 1993 by vocalist Raymond István Rohonyi, guitarists Pål Bjåstad and Tommy Lindal. Drummer Hein Frode Hansen had recently quit his former band Phobia and started looking for a new musical project to play in. A friend of his told Hein that a band called Suffering Grief was looking for a new drummer, and after contacting them, he joined the band. At the time, Suffering Grief was composed of vocalist Raymond István Rohonyi and guitarists Pål Bjåstad and Tommy Lindal. No bassist had joined the band yet, but Eirik T. Saltrø had agreed to play with them in live concerts.

After finding a rehearsal place, the band decided to work upon a couple of piano arrangements composed by Lorentz Aspen. The vocals, at the time, were almost entirely composed of raw death grunts.

After composing their first song, "Lament of the Perishing Roses", the band changed its name to La Reine Noir and then to Theatre of Tragedy. They subsequently invited singer Liv Kristine Espenæs — Rohonyi's then girlfriend — to perform female vocals for one song, but quickly invited her to join the band permanently.

=== First five albums (1994–2002) ===
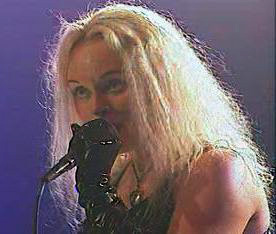
Liv Kristine was the lead singer of Theatre of Tragedy from their formation in 1993 to 2003.

In 1994, their first studio demo was recorded, and in 1995, the debut album Theatre of Tragedy was released, followed by Velvet Darkness They Fear in 1996 and the A Rose for the Dead EP in 1997, which contained unreleased material from Velvet Darkness They Fear. Arguably, the band reached the apogee of its career in 1998, with the release of the critically acclaimed album Aégis.

Released in 2000, Musique was a massive departure from the gothic metal sound that Theatre of Tragedy had developed over the previous three albums. The heavy guitars and Early Modern English lyrics were replaced by electropop and industrial-influenced metal. It was met with a very mixed reception, and while some older fans were understandably shocked by the new direction of the band, it did gain them a number of new fans.

With 2002's Assembly, the band continued along the same musical path as on their previous album. It was seen as a more refined and confident electropop record than its predecessor. It was also the first album to feature their long-time session guitarist, Vegard K. Thorsen, as a full member of the band.

=== Departure of Liv Kristine and Storm (2003–2007) ===
In August 2003, the band declared in an official statement on their website that Liv Kristine was removed from the band's line-up due to "musical differences which could not be bridged".

Female singer Nell Sigland (from The Crest) joined Theatre of Tragedy on the following year. In winter 2004/2005, the band performed a short concert tour (together with Pain, Sirenia, and Tiamat) with Sigland singing.

The band released their sixth studio album Storm on 24 March 2006, and a European tour followed, with Gothminister as supporting act. The album's title song was released as a single on 24 February 2006. While still keeping on the industrial and electronic roots of the last two albums, the album showed a return to some of the sounds developed in their first albums.

=== Forever Is the World (2008–2009) ===
On 2 October 2008, Theatre of Tragedy celebrated their 15th anniversary. In December 2008 the band posted a snippet of new track "Frozen," which was expected to be on the new album, on their MySpace music page:

"Time for some updates. Things are slowly moving forward with the next album. As usual with the Theatre machinery there is many things [sic] to take into consideration when doing stuff and recently we were forced to change collaborators for the production of the album, and postpone the recordings. But fear not the heavy responsibility has been entrusted to Alexander Møklebust (Zeromancer, Seigmen, Gåte, Monomen, Delaware etc) and the ToT crew will enter Room 13 in May and June for recordings and general mayhem! Estimated release from AFM is end of September. Rumor has it that there will be a vinyl version for the diehard fans. We will keep you posted."

In June 2009 saw the band reveal Forever Is the World as the title of the new album. Their 7th album was released in Europe on 21 September 2009, with the band making a step towards their earlier sound of Aégis. A special tour edition of Forever Is the World was issued on 12 March 2010. The tour edition contained a bonus CD known as the Addenda EP, which contains song reworkings and unreleased tracks.

Metal Mind Productions issued a press release in July stating that they were, with the co-operation of the band, re-releasing Musique and Assembly. Both albums have been remastered and will be backed with bonus tracks. New liner notes and artwork are said to be a part of the package. Each album is limited to 2000 numbered copies.

=== Breakup and aftermath (2010–present) ===
On 1 March 2010, Theatre of Tragedy issued a statement informing fans of their decision to split on 2 October 2010. The statement cited personal desires to spend more time with family and an inability to juggle their everyday working lives with a "rock and roll" lifestyle. On 12 March, Theatre of Tragedy kicked off their farewell tour, "Forever is the World Tour". The Norwegian symphonic goth metal band Where Angels Fall opened for them on the European part of the tour. In September, fans helped the band to secure funds to finish their first and last DVD by making donations when the label pulled out most of the funding for the production. The result was Last Curtain Call, a concert film from their very last show on 2 October 2010 in their hometown Stavanger.

On 5 July 2013, the band's first three albums were re-released and remastered.

In December 2015, Liv Kristine did a tour across Germany, Belgium, Russia, Poland, Netherlands, and United Kingdom, with her own solo project. She performed songs from her solo project and from Theatre of Tragedy like she usually does in solo concerts. Moreover, Raymond István Rohonyi joined her on this tour. She also played at the Metal Female Voices Fest XIII on 23 October 2016 along with Raymond. They also played a few songs of Theatre of Tragedy like they did in December 2015. The band members have stated, however, that there are no plans for a Theatre of Tragedy reunion, explaining that it is "as likely as a Doors reunion with the original lineup. No one has been approached or not approached."

== Musical style ==
The band made use of contrasting vocals – male bass vocals (making some use of death grunts) and female soprano singing (commonly referred to as "Beauty and the Beast" vocals) – and on their first three albums, presented lyrics written predominantly in Early Modern English. Starting from the album Musique, however, Theatre of Tragedy made drastic changes to its style, which became significantly inspired by the industrial rock genre, abandoning Early Modern English writing and death grunts in the process. On their two last releases, Storm and Forever Is The World, the band returned to a more classic gothic rock/metal sound.

== Band members ==
=== Final known lineup ===
- Raymond István Rohonyi – male vocals (1993–2010)
- Hein Frode Hansen – drums (1993–2010)
- Lorentz Aspen – keyboards, synthesizers (1993–2010)
- Frank Claussen – guitars (1997–2010)
- Vegard K. Thorsen – guitars (2000–2010)
- Nell Sigland – female vocals (2004–2010)
- Erik Torp – session bass (2010)

=== Former ===
- Liv Kristine – female vocals (1993–2003)
- Eirik T. Saltrø – bass (1993–2000)
- Magnus Westgaard – bass (2006, 2009)
- Tommy Lindal – guitar (1993–1997)
- Pål Bjåstad – guitar (1993–1995)
- Geir Flikkeid – guitar (1995–1997)
- Mathias Röderer – guitar (1996) – session musician
- Tommy Olsson – guitar (1997–1999)
- Bjørnar Landa – guitar (2006) – session musician

== Discography ==
=== Studio albums ===
Title	Album details	Peak chart positions
Title	Album details	GER
Theatre of Tragedy	Released: 4 July 1995; Label: Massacre Records; Formats: CD, CS, LP, digital download	—
Velvet Darkness They Fear	Released: 26 August 1996; Label: Massacre Records; Formats: CD, CS, LP, digital download	—
Aégis	Released: 18 August 1998; Label: Massacre Records; Formats: CD, CS, LP, digital download	40
Musique	Released: 2 October 2000; Label: Nuclear Blast; Formats: CD, CS, digital download	39
Assembly	Released: 4 March 2002; Label: Nuclear Blast; Formats: CD, CS, digital download	75
Storm	Released: 24 March 2006; Label: AFM Records; Formats: CD, digital download	—
Forever Is the World	Released: 18 September 2009; Label: AFM Records; Formats: CD, LP, digital download	—
"—" denotes a recording that did not chart or was not released in that territory.

=== Live albums ===
Title	Album details
closure:live	Released: 28 May 2001; Label: Massacre Records; Formats: CD, digital download
Last Curtain Call	Released: 20 May 2011; Label: AFM Records; Formats: CD, digital download

=== DVDs ===
Title	Album details
Last Curtain Call	Released: 20 May 2011; Label: AFM Records; Formats: DVD

=== EPs ===
Title	Album details
Der Tanz der Schatten	Released: 16 September 1996; Label: Massacre Records; Formats: CD
A Rose for the Dead	Released: 1 April 1997; Label: Massacre Records; Formats: CD, CS, digital download
Virago	Released: 26 May 1999; Label: Massacre Records; Formats: CD
Inperspective	Released: 4 December 2000; Label: Massacre Records; Formats: CD, CS, digital download
Machine	Released: 22 January 2001; Label: Nuclear Blast; Formats: CD, digital download
Storm	Released: 24 February 2006; Label: AFM Records; Formats: CD, digital download
Addenda	Released: 12 March 2010; Label: AFM Records; Formats: CD, digital download

=== Singles ===
Title	Year	Album
"Cassandra"	1998	Aégis
"Image"	2000	Musique
"Let You Down"	2002	Assembly
"Storm"	2006	Storm
"Deadland"	2009	Forever Is the World
