= Musique (album) =

Studio album by Theatre of Tragedy
- Released: October 2, 2000
- Studios: Soundsuite Studio, Marseille, France; Lydlab Studio, Oslo, Norway
- Genres: Industrial metal, electronic rock
- Length: 45:21
- Label: Nuclear Blast
- Producer: Erik Ljunggren

Theatre of Tragedy chronology
| Virago (1999) | Musique (2000) | Closure: Live (2001) |

Singles from Musique
- 1. "Image" Released: September 2000

Professional ratings
Review scores
| Source | Rating |
|---|---|
| AllMusic | 3/5 stars |
| Femme Metal | 7/10 |
| Rock Hard | 8.5/10 |

Musique is the fourth studio album by the Norwegian metal band Theatre of Tragedy, released in 2000. The title on the album's cover, [ˈmjuːzɪk], is the pronunciation of the English word "music" transcribed in the International Phonetic Alphabet.

Musique is the album that marked for the band the change from gothic metal with Early Modern English lyrics to a more electronic style, using Modern English. The change in musical direction for Theatre of Tragedy was associated with a change from traditional gothic and supernatural themes to lyrics based on modern life, including technology ("Machine", "Radio"), nightlife ("Image", "The New Man") and streetfighting ("Crash/Concrete"). The song "Commute" has the line "It's more fun to commute" in its lyrics, possibly a reference to Kraftwerk's "It's More Fun to Compute" from their Computer World album, which in turn is a reference to "It's more fun to compete" found on old pinball machines.

Metal Mind Productions reissued the album after it had been digitally remastered using a 24-bit process on a golden disc. It includes three bonus tracks, "Quirk (Original Version)", "Radio (Unreleased Mix)" and "Reverie (Unreleased Mix)". The reissue is limited to 2,000 copies and was released in Europe on 27 July 2009.

== Track listing ==
All songs written and composed by Theatre of Tragedy.

| No. | Title | Length |
|---|---|---|
| 1. | "Machine" | 4:14 |
| 2. | "City of Light" | 4:19 |
| 3. | "Fragment" | 4:00 |
| 4. | "Musique" | 3:29 |
| 5. | "Commute" | 5:25 |
| 6. | "Radio" | 3:39 |
| 7. | "Image" | 3:09 |
| 8. | "Crash/Concrete" | 3:21 |
| 9. | "Retrospect" | 4:03 |
| 10. | "Reverie" | 5:26 |
| 11. | "Space Age" | 4:16 |
| 12. | "The New Man" (bonus track) | 3:21 |
| Total length: | | 48:42 |

On the back of the album's casing, "Space Age" is written in Russian: "Космическая эра"; moreover, the words "Гагарина, Терешковой, Леонова, Лайки, Белки и Стрелки" ("Of Gagarin, Tereshkova, Leonov, of Laika, Belka and Strelka") are recited throughout the song.

The song "Reverie" begins with loading of a ZX Spectrum program from an audio cassette.

== Personnel ==
Theatre of Tragedy

- Raymond I. Rohonyi - vocals, programming
- Liv Kristine Espenæs - vocals
- Frank Claussen - guitars
- Lorentz Aspen - keyboards
- Hein Frode Hansen - drums

Additional musicians

- Erik Andre Rydningen - additional drums
- Erik Ljunggren - keyboards and programming

Production

- Erik Ljunggren - producer, engineer
- Jon Marius Aareskjold - engineer
- Ulf W. Ø. Holand - engineer and mixing

== Singles ==
Two tracks from Musique were released as singles.

- "Image" was released in 2000. This single had the album version of "Machine" plus remixes of "Fragment" by Element, and "Machine" by VNV Nation.
- Machine was released as an EP in 2001. The EP had the same remixes of "Fragment" and "Machine" which were on the "Image" single. The EP also had the French version of "Image", and a remix of "Reverie" and "Radio". The multimedia content on the disc is the video for "Image".

== Charts ==
| Chart (2000) | Peak position |
|---|---|
| German Albums Chart | 39 |
