= The Crest (band) =

Norwegian gothic metal/darkwave band

- Origin: Oslo, Norway
- Genres: Gothic metal, gothic rock, Dark Wave
- Years active: 1996–2010
- Labels: Season of Mist
- Members: Nell Sigland; Kristian Sigland; Magnus Westgaard; Stian Kilde Aarebrot; Klaus Blomvik
- Past members: David Husvik; Xander Sevon

The Crest was a gothic metal/darkwave band from Oslo, Norway noted for their gothic metal with catchy melodies, massive guitar sound, and a soothing female voice. The band was formed in 1996 by Nell and Kristian Sigland. After going through changes in name and line-up, the band settled on the name "The Crest" in 1999, after recording their second demo when they started to develop their characteristic sound.

In 2001, The Crest recorded their first full album, Letters from Fire, in Sound Suite Studio, together with Terje Refsnes, the producer of Tristania, Carpathian Forest, and The Sins of Thy Beloved.

In 2003 the band took a sabbatical to regain energy for their next album. Nell and Kristian spent time on a side project named "Rustflower Incorporated", experimenting with electronic music. Also in 2006, Nell replaced Liv Kristine as Theatre of Tragedy's vocalist.

The Crest reunited in 2004 and recorded their second album, Vain City Chronicles, at the Top Room Studio in Norway. The album features, according to the band, "a heavier, more guitar-based side of the band, while still focusing on the characteristic melancholic melodies and of course Nell's soothing voice."

In October 2010, Nell and Kristian stated that The Crest has split up to enable other projects.

== Band members ==
Last Known Lineup

- Nell Sigland – vocals, keyboards (also member of Theatre of Tragedy)
- Kristian Sigland – guitars, vocals, keyboards, programming
- Magnus Westgaard – bass, vocals
- Stian Kilde Aarebrot – guitars
- Klaus Blomvik – drums

Former

- David Husvik – drums (1996–2001)
- Xander Sevon – drums (2002–2004)

== Discography ==
=== Studio albums ===
- Letters from Fire (2002)
- Vain City Chronicles (2005)

=== Demos ===
Most of these demos ended up on the band's first release Letters from Fire.

- "Straightjacket Singalongs" – Demo (1998)
- "Childhood's End"/"Thorn" (1999)
- "Thunderfuel" (1999)
- "Dark Rock Armada" (2000)
