= Theatre of Tragedy (album) =

Studio album by Theatre of Tragedy
- Released: 4 July 1995
- Recorded: December 1994 – January 1995
- Studio: Unisound, Sweden
- Genre: Death-doom, gothic metal
- Length: 44:25
- Language: English, Early Modern English
- Label: Massacre
- Producer: Theatre of Tragedy

Theatre of Tragedy chronology
Theatre of Tragedy (demo) (1994)	Theatre of Tragedy (1995)	Velvet Darkness They Fear (1996)

Professional ratings
Review scores
Source	Rating
AllMusic	2.5/5 stars
Collector's Guide to Heavy Metal	6/10
Metal Storm	9.5/10
Rock Hard	8.5/10
Sputnikmusic	4/5

Theatre of Tragedy is the first studio album by the Norwegian gothic metal band Theatre of Tragedy. The album was issued in the US by Century Media Records in 1998.

== Track listing ==
All lyrics are written by Raymond Rohonyi; all music is composed by Theatre of Tragedy, except "...A Distance There Is..." lyrics by Rohonyi and Liv Kristine, music by Kristine and Lorentz Aspen.

No.	Title	Length
1.	"A Hamlet for a Slothful Vassal"	4:05
2.	"Cheerful Dirge"	5:02
3.	"To These Words I Beheld No Tongue"	5:06
4.	"Hollow-Heartèd, Heart-Departèd"	4:57
5.	"...A Distance There Is..."	8:51
6.	"Sweet Art Thou"	4:00
7.	"Mïre"	4:07
8.	"Dying – I Only Feel Apathy"	5:07
9.	"Monotonë"	3:10
Total length:		44:25

== Personnel ==
Theatre of Tragedy

- Raymond I. Rohonyi – vocals, lyrics
- Liv Kristine – vocals
- Pål Bjåstad – guitar
- Tommy Lindal – guitar
- Eirik T. Saltrø – bass guitar
- Lorentz Aspen – keyboards
- Hein Frode Hansen – drums

Guest musicians

- Anders Måreby – cello on tracks 4 and 5

Production

- Dan Swanö – engineering, mixing with Theatre of Tragedy
