= For Lack of a Better Name =

Studio album by Deadmau5
- Released: September 22, 2009
- Recorded: 2004–2009
- Genres: Electro house; progressive house
- Length: 65:52
- Labels: Mau5trap; Ultra; Virgin
- Producer: Joel Zimmerman

Deadmau5 chronology
At Play (2008)	For Lack of a Better Name (2009)	At Play Vol. 2 (2009)

Singles from For Lack of a Better Name
- 1. "Hi Friend!" Released: August 18, 2008; 2. "Ghosts 'n' Stuff" Released: November 24, 2008; 3. "Word Problems" Released: March 16, 2009; 4. "Lack of a Better Name" Released: July 28, 2009; 5. "Strobe" Released: September 3, 2009

Professional ratings
Review scores
Source	Rating
AllMusic	3.5/5 stars
Chart Attack	3.5/5 stars
The Guardian	3/5 stars
NME	6/10
The Observer	4/5 stars
Q	3/5 stars
Sputnikmusic	4.5/5
The Times	3/5 stars

For Lack of a Better Name is the fourth studio album by Canadian electronic music producer Deadmau5. It was released on September 22, 2009 in the United States and Canada by Ultra Records and Mau5trap and internationally on 5 October 2009 by Virgin Records. The album features collaborations with MC Flipside ("Hi Friend!") and Rob Swire of Pendulum ("Ghosts 'n' Stuff"). The album also contains the critically acclaimed song "Strobe". It was Deadmau5's first album to be released internationally on the Virgin Records label.

== Track listing ==
=== Continuous mix version ===
All tracks are written by Joel Zimmerman.

For Lack of a Better Name continuous mix track listing
No.	Title	Length
1.	"FML"	6:35
2.	"Moar Ghosts 'n' Stuff"	4:30
3.	"Ghosts 'n' Stuff" (featuring Rob Swire)	3:15
4.	"Hi Friend!" (featuring MC Flipside)	5:15
5.	"Bot"	5:22
6.	"Word Problems"	7:48
7.	"Soma"	6:07
8.	"Lack of a Better Name"	6:58
9.	"The 16th Hour"	9:29
10.	"Strobe"	10:37
Total length:		65:52

Amazon MP3 bonus tracks
No.	Title	Length
11.	"Ghosts 'n' Stuff" (Sub Focus Remix) (featuring Rob Swire)	4:26

iTunes bonus tracks
No.	Title	Length
11.	"Ghosts 'n' Stuff" (Nero Remix) (featuring Rob Swire)	6:55

=== The Extended Mixes ===
All tracks are written by Joel Zimmerman.

The Extended Mixes track listing
No.	Title	Length
1.	"FML"	7:01
2.	"Moar Ghosts 'n' Stuff"	4:57
3.	"Ghosts 'n' Stuff" (featuring Rob Swire)	5:29
4.	"Hi Friend!" (featuring MC Flipside)	6:32
5.	"Bot"	6:34
6.	"Word Problems"	8:30
7.	"Soma"	7:53
8.	"Lack of a Better Name"	8:15
9.	"The 16th Hour"	9:53
10.	"Strobe"	10:33

== In popular culture ==
A music video for "Ghosts 'n' Stuff" was released in August 2009. "Ghosts 'n' Stuff" was also featured on a promo for the Canadian edition of So You Think You Can Dance in 2010; the track was also in the 2020 music video game Fuser. The beginning of the song is also featured in a Chinese opusculum by Song Xiaobao. The songs "FML" and "Hi Friend!" are featured on an episode of Gossip Girl where deadmau5 appeared as himself. "Strobe" as well as the track "Cthulhu Sleeps" from his next album 4×4=12 also went on to appear in an episode of Epic Meal Time, in which Deadmau5 also starred.

== Charts ==
=== Weekly charts ===
Weekly chart performance for For Lack of a Better Name
Chart (2009–2010)	Peak position
Australian Albums (ARIA)	49
Australian Dance Albums (ARIA)	9
Canadian Albums (Nielsen SoundScan)	62
Irish Albums (IRMA)	37
Scottish Albums (Official Charts)	22
UK Albums (Official Charts)	19
UK Dance Albums (Official Charts)	1
US Heatseekers Albums (Billboard)	15
US Independent Albums (Billboard)	46
US Top Dance Albums (Billboard)	11

=== Year-end charts ===
Year-end chart performance for For Lack of a Better Name
Chart (2010)	Position
US Top Dance/Electronic Albums (Billboard)	22

== Certifications ==
Certifications for For Lack of a Better Name
Region	Certification	Certified units/sales
Canada (Music Canada)	Gold	40,000^{^}
United Kingdom (BPI)	Gold	100,000^{‡}
^{^} Shipments figures based on certification alone.^{‡} Sales+streaming figures based on certification alone.
