= Martin Henriksson =

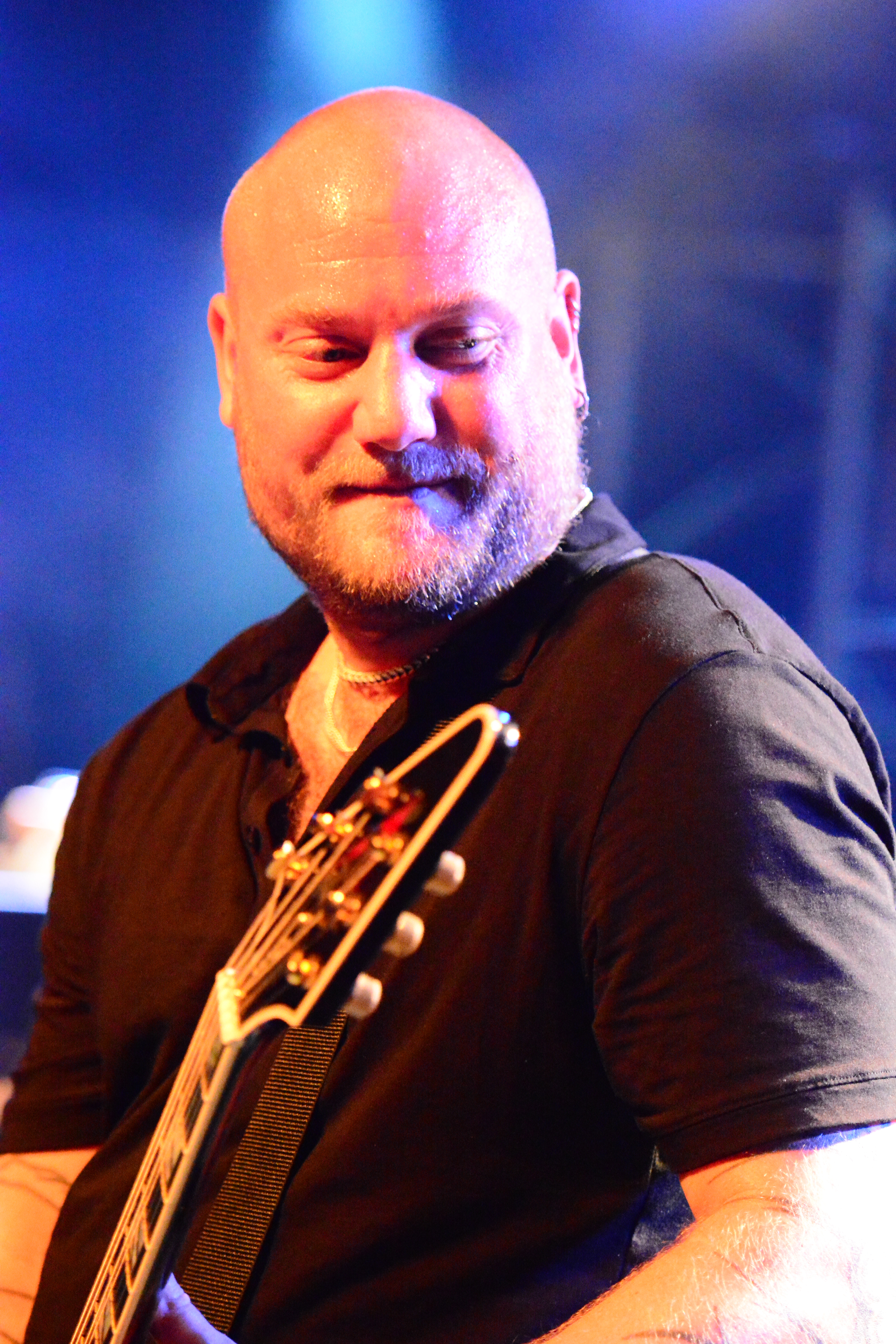
- Henriksson in 2014

Background information
- Birth name: Hans Martin Knut Henriksson
- Born: 30 October 1974 (age 50); Gothenburg, Sweden
- Genres: Melodic death metal; gothic metal
- Instruments: Guitar; bass
- Years active: 1989–2015
- Labels: Century Media; Osmose Productions; Spinefarm

Hans Martin Knut Henriksson (born 30 October 1974) is a former Swedish musician and songwriter best known for his work with melodic death metal band Dark Tranquillity and was one of the original members, and the main songwriter for the band until he left them in 2016.

== Biography ==
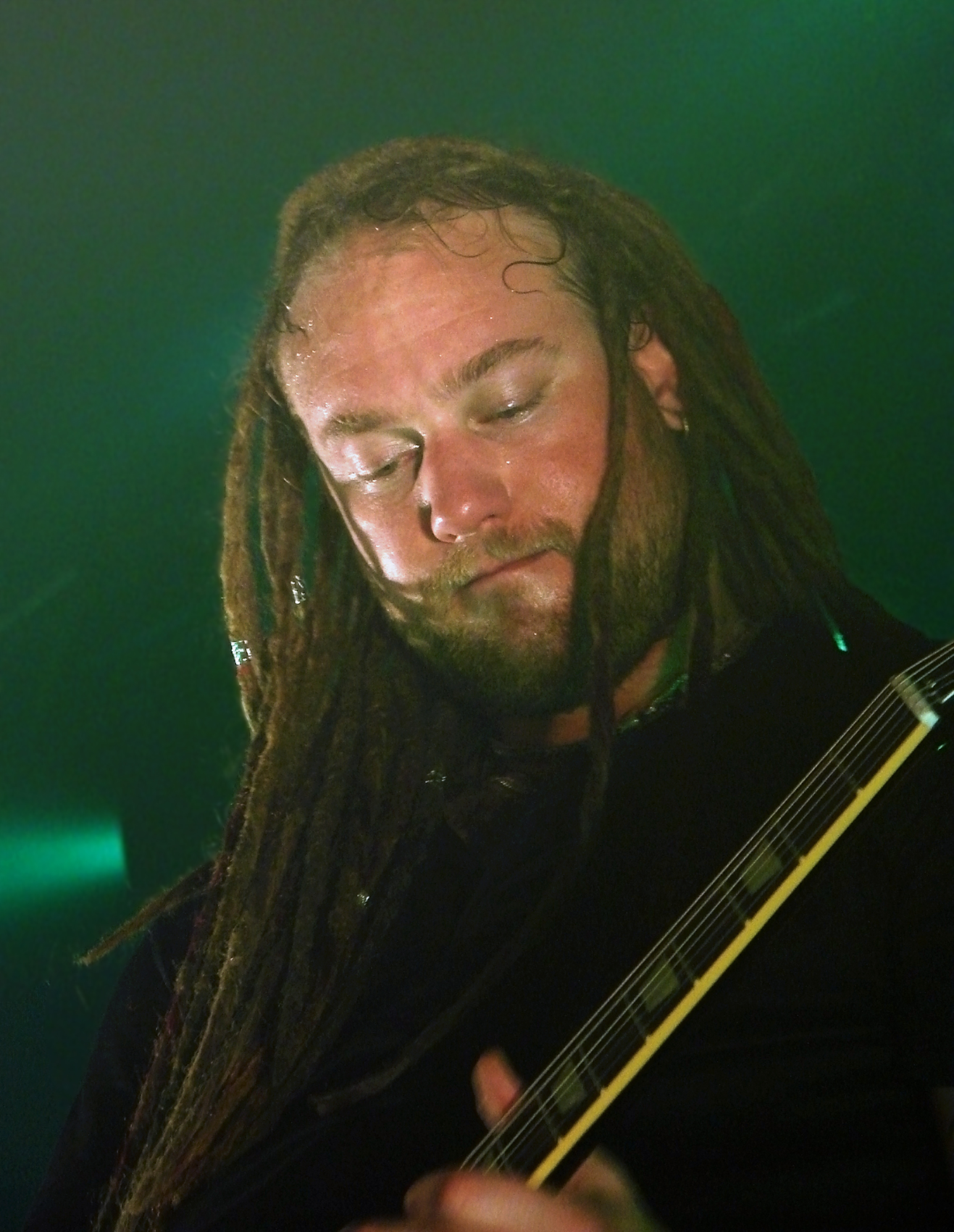
Henriksson in 2008

When Dark Tranquillity formed in 1989 Henriksson was the bassist up until 1999. He switched to guitar when guitarist Fredrik Johansson quit, but recorded bass again once on 2013's Construct when the band had no bassist at the time. He composed much of the band's music throughout his tenure, especially between Projector and Fiction.

Although Henriksson had been inactive with the band since 2015 it wasn't until January 2016 that he started to realize he didn't want to be in the band anymore. His official resignation became effective 31 March 2016 when Dark Tranquillity announced Henriksson's departure from the band.

== Style ==
In Dark Tranquillity, he plays both rhythms and melodies. He is known for his smooth playing style, while Niklas Sundin, Dark Tranquillity's other guitarist, has a more harsh style. He normally does not play solos (Sundin usually performs them). Some exceptions to that are the songs 'Focus Shift' and 'Lost to Apathy', in whose videos Martin is seen playing slow, smooth leads. His riffs are sometimes complemented with pick slides and harmonics. When he was on bass (using picks), he also played melodies.

== Equipment ==
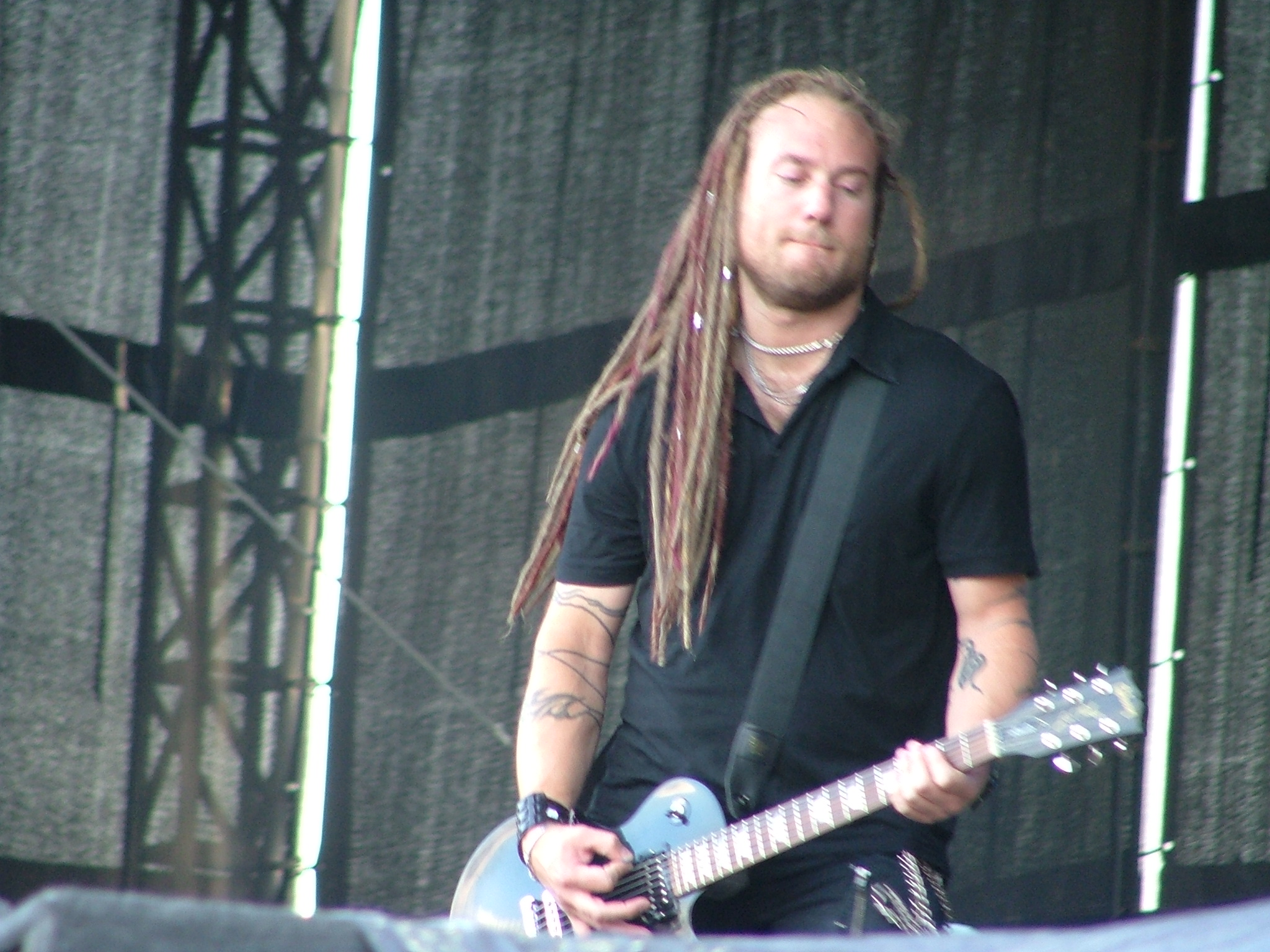
Henriksson with Dark Tranquillity in 2007

Martin's main stage guitars include a Gibson Explorer and a Gibson Les Paul Studio Lite. He previously used Rocktron Prophesy rack mounted pre-amps, but after the Damage Done tour, he and Niklas Sundin begun using Peavey 5150 and Mesa/Boogie Dual Rectifier amplifiers along with Behringer V-AMP 2 PRO modeling processors. In the making off We Are The Void, they show a Peavey 6505s.
