= Nervo discography =

Discography

- Studio albums: 1
- Singles: 64
- Remixes: 16

This is the discography for Australian electronic music duo Nervo.

== Albums ==
List of studio albums
Title	Album details
Collateral	Released: 24 July 2015; Label: Ultra Records; Format: CD, CD+DVD, digital download

== Singles ==
=== As lead artist ===
List of singles as lead artist, with selected chart positions, showing year released and album name
Title	Year	Peak chart positions									Album
Title	Year	BEL (FL)	BEL (WA)	FRA	IRE	NLD	SCO	SWE	UK	US Dance	Album
"Boobjob"	2005	—	—	—	—	—	—	—	—	—	Non-album singles
"This Kind of Love" (featuring Ollie James)	2010	—	—	—	—	—	—	—	—	—	Non-album singles
"Irresistible" (featuring Ollie James)	2010	—	—	—	—	—	—	—	—	—	Non-album singles
"The Way We See the World" (with Afrojack and Dimitri Vegas & Like Mike)	2011	34	—	—	—	—	—	—	—	—	Non-album singles
"We're All No One" (featuring Afrojack and Steve Aoki)	2011	106	—	—	—	—	—	—	135	8	Collateral
"You're Gonna Love Again"	2012	105	74	126	—	—	—	—	—	4	Collateral
"Reason" (with Hook n Sling)	2012	—	—	—	—	—	—	—	—	—	Collateral
"Like Home" (with Nicky Romero)	2012	126	73	—	53	81	16	37	33	—	Non-album single
"Hold On"	2013	—	87	—	—	—	—	—	182	1	Collateral
"Not Taking This No More" (with Ivan Gough and Beverley Knight)	2013	—	—	—	—	—	—	—	—	—	Non-album singles
"Revolution" (with R3hab and Ummet Ozcan)	2014	76	—	163	67	—	25	—	37	—	Non-album singles
"Ready for the Weekend" (with R3hab featuring Ayah Marar)	2014	106	—	—	—	—	—	—	—	—	Non-album singles
"Don't Break My Heart" (with Marco Lys)	2014	—	—	—	—	—	—	—	—	—	Non-album singles
"Sunshine Thru Rain Clouds" (featuring Duane Harden)	2014	—	—	—	—	—	—	—	—	—	Non-album singles
"Rise Early Morning" (featuring Au Revoir Simone)	2014	—	—	—	—	—	—	—	—	—	Collateral
"It Feels"	2015	—	—	—	—	—	—	—	—	—	Collateral
"Haute Mess"	2015	—	—	—	—	—	—	—	—	5	Collateral
"Lightning Strikes" (with Steve Aoki and Tony Junior)	2015	—	—	—	—	—	—	—	—	—	Neon Future II
"Hey Ricky" (featuring Kreayshawn, Dev and Alisa Ueno)	2015	—	—	—	—	—	—	—	—	—	Collateral
"The Other Boys" (featuring Kylie Minogue, Jake Shears and Nile Rodgers)	2015	—	—	—	—	—	—	—	—	1	Collateral
"Bulletproof" (featuring Harrison Miya)	2016	—	—	—	—	—	—	—	—	5	Collateral
"Let It Go" (featuring Nicky Romero)	2016	—	—	—	—	—	—	—	—	4	Collateral
"Did We Forget" (featuring Amba Shepherd)	2016	—	—	—	—	—	—	—	—	—	Collateral
"People Grinnin'" (featuring the Child of Lov)	2016	—	—	—	—	—	—	—	—	1	Non-album singles
"Anywhere You Go" (featuring Timmy Trumpet)	2016	—	—	—	—	—	—	—	—	—	Non-album singles
"Forever or Nothing" (with Savi and Lauren Bennet)	2016	—	—	—	—	—	—	—	—	—	Non-album singles
"Alone" (with Askery)	2016	—	—	—	—	—	—	—	—	—	Non-album singles
"In Your Arms"	2017	—	—	—	—	—	—	—	—	—	Non-album singles
"Lost in You" (with Quintino)	2017	—	—	—	—	—	—	—	—	—	Non-album singles
"Champagne" (featuring Chief Keef)	2017	—	—	—	—	—	—	—	—	—	Non-album singles
"LOCO" (with Danny Avila featuring Reverie)	2017	—	—	—	—	—	—	—	—	—	Non-album singles
"Like Air" (with Wolfpack)	2017	—	—	—	—	—	—	—	—	—	Non-album singles
"Why Do I"	2018	—	—	—	—	—	—	—	—	—	Non-album singles
"What Would You Do For Love"	2018	—	—	—	—	—	—	—	—	—	Non-album singles
"Emotional" (featuring Ryann)	2018	—	—	—	—	—	—	—	—	—	Non-album singles
"Worlds Collide"	2019	—	—	—	—	—	—	—	—	—	Non-album singles
"Habit"	2019	—	—	—	—	—	—	—	—	—	Non-album singles
"Sober"	2019	—	—	—	—	—	—	—	—	—	Non-album singles
"Illusion" (with Firebeatz featuring Karra)	2019	—	—	—	—	—	—	—	—	—	Non-album singles
"Faded" (with Skazi)	2019	—	—	—	—	—	—	—	—	—	Non-album singles
"Dare Me" (with Plastik Funk and Tim Morrison)	2020	—	—	—	—	—	—	—	—	—	Non-album singles
"My World" (with Vini Vici and Shapov)	2020	—	—	—	—	—	—	—	—	—	Non-album singles
"Supermodel" (with Kandy)	2020	—	—	—	—	—	—	—	—	—	Non-album singles
"Love On Me" (with 7 Skies)	2020	—	—	—	—	—	—	—	—	—	Non-album singles
"Goddess" (with Krewella featuring Raja Kumari)	2020	—	—	—	—	—	—	—	—	—	Non-album singles
"Hurt" (featuring Frida Sundemo)	2020	—	—	—	—	—	—	—	—	—	Non-album singles
"Acrylic" (with Jess Ball)	2020	—	—	—	—	—	—	—	—	—	Non-album singles
"Gotta Be You" (with Carla Monroe)	2021	—	—	—	—	—	—	—	—	—	Non-album singles
"Pickle" (featuring Tinie Tempah & Paris Hilton)	2021	—	—	—	—	—	—	—	—	—	Non-album singles
"Basement"	2021	—	—	—	—	—	—	—	—	—	Non-album singles
"Come Into My World" (with Alexandra Stan)	2021	—	—	—	—	—	—	—	—	—	Non-album singles
"Lights Down Low" (with Tube & Berger)	2021	—	—	—	—	—	—	—	—	—	Non-album singles
"Horizon"	2021	—	—	—	—	—	—	—	—	—	Non-album singles
"Flames" (with Midnight City & Salena Mastroianni)	2022	—	—	—	—	—	—	—	—	—	Non-album singles
"Unbreakable" (with Nataliya Nikitenko)	2022	—	—	—	—	—	—	—	—	—	Non-album singles
"Giving It All"	2022	—	—	—	—	—	—	—	—	—	Non-album singles
"Is Someone Looking For Me (with Ace Paloma)	2022	—	—	—	—	—	—	—	—	—	Non-album singles
"Could've Been Love" (with Holly Ellison)	2023	—	—	—	—	—	—	—	—	—	Non-album singles
"Hey Yesterday" (with Ben Nicky & Madlucky)	2023	—	—	—	—	—	—	—	—	—	Non-album singles
"Crazy" (with Plastik Funk & Elle Vee)	2023	—	—	—	—	—	—	—	—	—	Non-album singles
"My Reason" (with Hook N Sling)	2023	—	—	—	—	—	—	—	—	—	Non-album singles
"Voices" (with 22Bullets & Naeleck)	2024	—	—	—	—	—	—	—	—	—	Non-album singles
"Come Dance"	2024	—	—	—	—	—	—	—	—	—	Non-album singles
"Talk About Us" (with Plastik Funk & Julia Temos)	2024	—	—	—	—	—	—	—	—	—	Non-album singles
"You're Not Alone" (with Rudeejay & Da Brooz)	2024	—	—	—	—	—	—	—	—	—	Non-album singles
"Mickey" (with Tigerlily)	2025	—	—	—	—	—	—	—	—	—	Non-album singles
"Wherever You Go" (with B Jones & EKE)	2025	—	—	—	—	—	—	—	—	—	Non-album singles
"Billion Dollar Baby" (with Studio Killers and Crazy Donkey)	2025	—	—	—	—	—	—	—	—	—	Non-album singles
"Destination Unknown (Calabria)" (with 22Bullets)	2025	—	—	—	—	—	—	—	—	—	Non-album singles
"Don't Run" (with Nusha)	2026	—	—	—	—	—	—	—	—	—	Non-album singles
"—" denotes a recording that did not chart or was not released in that territory.

=== As featured artist ===
List of singles as featured artist, with selected chart positions, showing year released and album name
Title	Year	Peak chart positions				Album
Title	Year	BEL (FL)	CAN	FRA	US	Album
"Livin' My Love" (Steve Aoki featuring LMFAO and Nervo)	2012	—	68	—	—	Wonderland
"Best Friend" (Sofi Tukker featuring Nervo, the Knocks and Alisa Ueno)	2017	10	61	86	81	Treehouse
"Crying Shame" (Pegboard Nerds featuring Nervo)	2019	—	—	—	—	Heart of the Universe
"—" denotes a recording that did not chart or was not released in that territory.

=== Guest appearances ===
List of non-single guest appearances, with other performing artists, showing year released and album name
Title	Year	Other artist(s)	Album
"In My Head"	2011	David Guetta, Daddy's Groove	Nothing but the Beat 2.0
"Turn This Love Around"	2013	Armin van Buuren, Laura V.	Intense
"Give it All Up"	2018	Angger Dimas, Nervo	Non-album single
"You Don't Get Me - Spanish Remix"	2018	Paty Cantú, Nervo, Andrés Saavedra	#333
"Velocidade"	2024	Cat Dealers, Nervo, Elise LeGrow	Non-album single
"Freaking You Out"	2025	Robin Schulz, Nervo	Non-album single
"Mad About You"	2026	Bachelor Girl	Waiting for the Day: Artist Sessions

== Remixes ==
2010

- Delerium featuring Kreesha Turner – "Dust in Gravity" (Nervo Radio Edit)
- Sérgio Mendes – "Mas Que Nada" (Nervo Club Remix)

2011

- Katy Perry – "California Gurls" (Nervo Remix)
- Kylie Minogue – "Put Your Hands Up (If You Feel Love)" (Nervo Hands Up Extended Club Mix)

2012

- Namie Amuro – "Let's Go" (Nervo Remix)

2013

- Beyoncé – "Grown Woman" (Nervo Remix)

2014

- Cyndi Lauper – "Time After Time" (Nervo Back In Time Remix)

2017

- Sofi Tukker – "Best Friend" (Nervo & Jeffs Retro's Let's Get Busy Remix)
- Robin Schulz, HUGEL – "I Believe I'm Fine" (Nervo Remix)

2018

- NERVO – "What Would You Do For Love" (Nervo & Decoy! Get Serious Remix)
- Robin Schulz, Piso 21 – "Oh Child" (Nervo & Aligee Remix)

2020

- Cyn - "Drinks" (Nervo Remix)
- Ben Hazlewood – "Lay Me Down" (Nervo Remix)
- Anabel Englund - "Picture Us" (Nervo Remix)

2021

- NERVO – "Moonlight 2021 NERVO Edit (Presto, Piano Sonata No. 14, 'Moonlight') - Beethoven Remixed"
- Alexandra Stan – "Come Into My World" (Rosé All Day Nervo Remix)

2022

- The Regrettes – "Barely On My Mind" (Nervo Remix)

2023

- Petra Marklund – "Ocean Of Love" (Nervo Raises the BPM Remix)

2024

- Karin Ann – "I Don't Believe In God" (Nervo Remix)

2025

- Ben Hazlewood – "Too Loud For Tokyo" (Nervo Remix)

2026

- Jairic – "Don't Let Me Put A Track On You" (Nervo Remix)

== Songwriting discography ==
Year	Artist	Title	Appearance
2005	Rachel Stevens	"Negotiate with Love"	Come and Get It
2006	Jolin Tsai	"Dancing Diva" (舞孃)	Dancing Diva (舞孃)
2006	Jolin Tsai	"Mr. Q"	Dancing Diva (舞孃)
2008	The Pussycat Dolls	"If I Was a Man" (Jessica Sutta solo)	Doll Domination
2008	Kana Nishino	"I"	Love One.
2009	Jordan McCoy	"Next Ex Boyfriend"	Just Watch Me
2009	Jordan McCoy	"Unnoticed"	Just Watch Me
2009	Miley Cyrus	"Let's Get Crazy" (as Hannah Montana)	Hannah Montana: The Movie
2009	Tone Damli	"Still"	I Know
2009	David Guetta	"When Love Takes Over" (featuring Kelly Rowland)	One Love
2009	David Guetta	"It's the Way You Love Me" (featuring Kelly Rowland)	One Love
2009	David Guetta	"Sound of Letting Go" (featuring Tocadisco and Chris Willis)	One Love
2009	David Guetta	"It's Your Life" (featuring Chris Willis)	One Love
2009	Allison Iraheta	"Don't Waste the Pretty"	Just Like You
2010	Kesha	"Boots & Boys"	Animal
2010	Kesha	"VIP"	Animal
2010	Kylie Minogue	"Put Your Hands Up (If You Feel Love)"	Aphrodite
2010	Armin van Buuren	"Not Giving Up on Love" (featuring Sophie Ellis-Bextor)	Mirage
2010	Armin van Buuren	"Feels So Good" (featuring Nadia Ali)	Mirage
2010	Armin van Buuren	"Drowning" (featuring Laura V)	Mirage
2010	Indigo	"We Said We'd Try"	The Colour of Dreaming
2010	Play	"Second Hand Love"	Under My Skin
2011	Kesha	"Fuck Him He's a DJ"	I Am the Dance Commander + I Command You to Dance: The Remix Album
2011	Charlee	"Too Fast"	This Is Me
2011	Charlee	"Dream You to Life"	This Is Me
2011	Wynter Gordon	"Drunk on Your Love"	With the Music I Die
2011	Avicii	"Enough Is Enough"	
2011	David Guetta	"Night of Your Life" (featuring Jennifer Hudson)	Nothing but the Beat
2011	Agnes	"Don't Go Breaking My Heart"	Collection
2011	Nicole Scherzinger	"Try with Me"	Killer Love
2012	Namie Amuro	"Hot Girls"	Uncontrolled
2012	Namie Amuro	"Go Round ('n Round 'n Round)"	Uncontrolled
2012	Namie Amuro	"Let's Go"	Uncontrolled
2012	Namie Amuro	"Singing Yeah-Oh"	Uncontrolled
2012	Jane Huang	"Yao Ming (要命)" ("Kill")	Tu Zhong (图 中)
2012	Norman Doray	"Something to Believe in" (featuring Cookie)	
2013	Agnes	"Got Me Good"	Veritas
2013	Armin van Buuren	"Turn This Love Around" (featuring Laura V)	Intense
2014	After School	"Triangle"	After School
2020	Nora En Pure, Tim Morrison	"Come Away"	Come Away
2023	Hannah Diamond	"Want To You Know"	Perfect Picture (album)
2026	Leo Ieiri	"We Could Be Something"	31
2026	Leo Ieiri	"Too Late"	31
