= Nicky Romero discography =

This is the discography for Dutch electronic musician Nicky Romero.

== Compilation albums ==
Title	Details
Nicky Romero Best 2016	Released: 5 October 2016; Label: Protocol Recordings; Formats: Digital download, CD, vinyl
Nicky Romero presents Protocol Miami 2017	Released: 17 February 2017; Label: Protocol Recordings; Formats: Digital download, CD, vinyl

== Extended plays ==
Title	Details	Ref.
Redefine	Released: 27 March 2020; Label: Protocol Recordings; Formats: Digital download	
Monocule (Volume 1) (as Monocule)	Released: 4 September 2020; Label: Protocol Recordings; Formats: Digital download	
Nights With You	Released: 20 November 2020; Label: Protocol Recordings; Formats: Digital download	
Monocule (Volume 2) (as Monocule)	Released: 7 May 2021; Label: Protocol Recordings; Formats: Digital download	
See You on the Dancefloor (with Low Blow)	Released: 4 February 2022; Label: Protocol Recordings; Formats: Digital download	

== Singles ==
=== As lead artist ===
List of singles as lead artist, with selected chart positions and certifications, showing year released and album name
Title	Year	Peak chart positions									Certifications	Album
Title	Year	NLD	AUS	AUT	BEL	FRA	GER	SWE	SWI	UK	Certifications	Album
"Funktion One"	2008	—	—	—	—	—	—	—	—	—		Non-album singles
"Q.W.E.R.T.Y"	2008	—	—	—	—	—	—	—	—	—		Non-album singles
"Woods of Idaho"	2009	—	—	—	—	—	—	—	—	—		Non-album singles
"Ducktale"	2009	—	—	—	—	—	—	—	—	—		Non-album singles
"Get High / Signature"	2009	—	—	—	—	—	—	—	—	—		Non-album singles
"Switched"	2010	—	—	—	—	—	—	—	—	—		Non-album singles
"Assigned / Pixelized"	2010	—	—	—	—	—	—	—	—	—		Non-album singles
"When Love Calls" (featuring Basto)	2010	—	—	—	—	—	—	—	—	—		Non-album singles
"My Friend"	2010	—	—	—	—	—	—	—	—	—		Non-album singles
"Growl"	2010	—	—	—	—	—	—	—	—	—		Non-album singles
"Solar"	2011	—	—	—	—	—	—	—	—	—		Non-album singles
"Play n’ Stop"	2011	—	—	—	—	—	—	—	—	—		Non-album singles
"Keyword"	2011	—	—	—	—	—	—	—	—	—		Non-album singles
"Schizophrenic" (with Mitch Crown)	2011	—	—	—	—	—	—	—	—	—		Non-album singles
"Bootcamp" (with Apster)	2011	—	—	—	—	—	—	—	—	—		Non-album singles
"Camorra"	2011	—	—	—	—	—	—	—	—	—		Non-album singles
"Beta" (with Hardwell)	2011	—	—	—	—	—	—	—	—	—		Non-album singles
"Toulouse"	2012	92	—	—	—	—	—	—	—	—	NVPI: Gold	Non-album singles
"Generation 303"	2012	—	—	—	—	—	—	—	—	—		Non-album singles
"WTF!?" (with ZROQ)	2012	—	—	—	—	—	—	—	—	—		Non-album singles
"Sparks" (with Fedde Le Grand)	2012	—	—	—	—	—	—	—	—	—		Non-album singles
"Sparks (Turn Off Your Mind)" (with Fedde Le Grand featuring Matthew Koma)	2012	—	—	—	—	—	—	—	—	—		Non-album singles
"Human" (with Zedd)	2012	—	—	—	—	—	—	—	—	—		Non-album singles
"Like Home" (with Nervo)	2012	81	—	—	76	—	—	37	—	33	NVPI: 2× Platinum	Collateral
"I Could Be the One" (vs. Avicii)	2012	15	4	15	8	22	37	3	26	1	NVPI: 3× Platinum; ARIA: 4× Platinum; BEA: Gold; BPI: 2× Platinum; RIAA: Platinum	Non-album singles
"Still the Same Man" (featuring John Christian and Nilson)	2013	—	—	—	—	—	—	—	—	—		Non-album singles
"Ignition"	2013	—	—	—	—	—	—	—	—	—		Non-album singles
"Symphonica"	2013	—	31	—	—	—	—	—	—	—	NVPI: Gold	Non-album singles
"Legacy" (vs. Krewella)	2013	—	44	—	—	—	—	—	—	—	NVPI: Gold	Non-album singles
"S.O.T.U." (with Sunnery James & Ryan Marciano featuring Fast Eddie)	2013	—	—	—	89	—	—	—	—	—		Non-album singles
"Feet on the Ground" (with Anouk)	2014	80	—	—	—	—	—	—	—	—		Non-album singles
"Let Me Feel" (with Vicetone featuring When We Are Wild)	2014	—	—	—	—	—	—	—	—	—		Non-album singles
"Warriors" (with Volt & State)	2015	—	—	—	—	—	—	—	—	—		Non-album singles
"Lighthouse" (featuring Danny Shah)	2015	—	—	—	38	—	—	—	—	—		Non-album singles
"Harmony" (with Stadiumx)	2015	—	—	—	—	—	—	—	—	—		Non-album singles
"Future Funk" (with Nile Rodgers)	2016	—	—	—	—	—	—	—	—	—		Non-album singles
"Novell"	2016	—	—	—	—	—	—	—	—	—		Non-album singles
"The Moment (Novell)"	2016	—	—	—	—	—	—	—	—	—		Non-album singles
"Ready 2 Rumble"	2016	—	—	—	—	—	—	—	—	—		Non-album singles
"Take Me" (featuring Colton Avery)	2016	—	—	—	—	—	—	—	—	—		Non-album singles
"Crossroads" (with Navarra)	2016	—	—	—	—	—	—	—	—	—		Non-album singles
"Iconic" (with John Christian)	2017	—	—	—	—	—	—	—	—	—		Non-album singles
"Sober" (with Cheat Codes)	2017	—	—	—	—	—	—	—	—	—		Non-album singles
"Champion Sound" (with Teamworx)	2017	—	—	—	—	—	—	—	—	—		Non-album singles
"Only for Your Love" (with Florian Picasso)	2017	—	—	—	—	—	—	—	—	—		Non-album singles
"Prtcl" (featuring Spyder)	2018	—	—	—	—	—	—	—	—	—		Non-album singles
"Where Would We Be" (with ROZES)	2018	—	—	—	—	—	—	—	—	—		I Don't Know Where I'm Going, But I'm on My Way
"Duality"	2018	—	—	—	—	—	—	—	—	—		Non-album single
"Here We Go (Hey Boy, Hey Girl)" (with Dimitri Vegas & Like Mike)	2018	—	—	—	—	—	—	—	—	—		Tomorrowland 2018 EP
"Me on You" (with Taio Cruz)	2018	—	—	—	—	—	—	—	—	—		Non-album singles
"Rise" (with Stadiumx featuring Matluck)	2018	—	—	—	—	—	—	— (Note: "Rise" did not enter the Swedish Singellista Chart, but peaked at number 15 on the Swedish Heatseeker Chart.)	—	—		Non-album singles
"Be Somebody" (with Steve Aoki featuring Kiiara)	2018	—	—	—	—	—	—	—	—	—		Non-album singles
"Paradise" (with Deniz Koyu featuring Walk off the Earth)	2018	—	—	—	—	—	—	—	—	—		Non-album singles
"Bittersweet" (with Trilane & Kokaholla featuring Quarterback)	2018	—	—	—	—	—	—	—	—	—		Non-album singles
"My Way" (featuring Alice Berg)	2018	—	—	—	—	—	—	—	—	—		Non-album singles
"Distance" (with Olivia Holt)	2019	—	—	—	—	—	—	—	—	—		Non-album singles
"Ring the Alarm" (with David Guetta)	2019	—	—	—	—	—	—	—	—	—		Non-album singles
"Deep Dark Jungle" (with Teamworx)	2019	—	—	—	—	—	—	—	—	—		Non-album singles
"Sometimes" (with DallasK featuring XYLØ)	2019	—	—	—	—	—	—	—	—	—		Non-album singles
"Ups & Downs" (with W&W)	2019	—	—	—	—	—	—	—	—	—		Non-album singles
"Midnight Sun" (with Florian Picasso)	2019	—	—	—	—	—	—	—	—	—		Non-album singles
"Love You Forever" (with Stadiumx featuring Sam Martin)	2019	—	—	—	—	—	—	—	—	—		Non-album singles
"Everybody Clap" (with Dimitri Vegas & Like Mike)	2019	—	—	—	—	—	—	—	—	—		Non-album singles
"Dynamite" (with Mike Williams featuring Amba Shepherd)	2019	—	—	—	—	—	—	—	—	—		Non-album singles
"I See"	2020	—	—	—	—	—	—	—	—	—		Redefine
"Stay"	2020	—	—	—	—	—	—	—	—	—		Non-album singles
"Falling" (with Timmy Trumpet)	2020	—	—	—	—	—	—	—	—	—		Non-album singles
"Destiny" (with Deniz Koyu featuring Alexander Tidebrink)	2020	—	—	—	—	—	—	—	—	—		Non-album singles
"Burning" (featuring Jordan Grace)	2020	—	—	—	—	—	—	—	—	—		Non-album singles
"I Need You to Know" (with Armin van Buuren featuring Ifimay)	2020	—	—	—	—	—	—	—	—	—		Non-album singles
"Only for You" (with Sick Individuals featuring Xira)	2020	—	—	—	—	—	—	—	—	—		Non-album singles
"Nights with You"	2020	—	—	—	—	—	—	—	—	—		Non-album singles
"Into the Light" (with Timmo Hendriks featuring David Shane)	2021	—	—	—	—	—	—	—	—	—		Non-album singles
"Back to You"	2021	—	—	—	—	—	—	—	—	—		Non-album singles
"World Through Your Eyes" (with Teamworx featuring Joseph Feinstein)	2021	—	—	—	—	—	—	—	—	—		Non-album singles
"Okay" (with Marf featuring Wulf)	2021	—	—	—	—	—	—	—	—	—		Non-album singles
"We're Still Young" (with W&W featuring Olivia Penalva)	2021	—	—	—	—	—	—	—	—	—		Non-album singles
"Love Me Better"	2021	—	—	—	—	—	—	—	—	—		Non-album singles
"Acid is My DNA"	2021	—	—	—	—	—	—	—	—	—		Non-album singles
"Why Do I Call"	2021	—	—	—	—	—	—	—	—	—		Non-album singles
"Afterglow" (with Gattüso and Jared Lee)	2022	—	—	—	—	—	—	—	—	—		Non-album singles
"So Much Love" (with Almero)	2022	—	—	—	—	—	—	—	—	—		Non-album singles
"Lose My Mind"	2022	—	—	—	—	—	—	—	—	—		Non-album singles
"Pressure"	2022	—	—	—	—	—	—	—	—	—		Non-album singles
"All You Need is Love" (with Jonas Blue and Nico Santos)	2023	—	—	—	—	—	—	—	—	—		Non-album singles
"Forever" (with Nico & Vinz)	2023	—	—	—	—	—	—	—	—	—		Non-album singles
"Love You for the Summer" (with Öwnboss and Oaks)	2024	—	—	—	—	—	—	—	—	—		Non-album singles
"Where Do I Go" (with Vikkstar, Alpharock and Oaks)	2024	—	—	—	—	—	—	—	—	—		Non-album singles
"—" denotes a recording that did not chart or was not released in that territory.

=== As Monocule ===
Title	Year	Album	Ref.
"Time to Save" (with Tim van Werd featuring Mosimann)	2020	Monocule (Volume 1)	
"You Don't Know"	2020	Monocule (Volume 2)	
"Awakening"	2021	Non-album single	
"On My Mind"	2022	Non-album single	

=== As featured artist ===
List of singles as featured artist, with selected chart positions, showing year released and album name
Title	Year	Peak chart positions		Album
Title	Year	AUT	GER	Album
"Wild One Two" (Jack Back featuring David Guetta, Nicky Romero and Sia)	2012	43	43	Non-album single
"Let It Go" (Nervo featuring Nicky Romero)	2016	—	—	Collateral
"—" denotes a recording that did not chart or was not released in that territory.

=== Promotional singles ===
List of promotional singles, with selected chart positions and certifications, showing year released and album name
Title	Year	Peak chart positions	Certifications	Album
Title	Year	FRA	Certifications	Album
"Metropolis" (with David Guetta)	2012	41		Nothing but the Beat 2.0
"Iron" (with Calvin Harris)	2012	—	NVPI: Gold	18 Months
"—" denotes a recording that did not chart or was not released in that territory.

== Free releases ==
2012

- Freaky (with Fedde Le Grand)
- Slacking (with Fedde Le Grand featuring MC Gee)

== Remixes ==
2008

- Prunk Le Funk — Chronology (Nicky Romero Remix)

2009

- Mell Tierra and Sebastian D featuring Stanford — Maximize (Nicky Romero Remix)
- Steff Da Campo vs. Ecoustic featuring Lady Rio — Freakybeatza (Nicky Romero and Praia Del Sol Remix)
- Sidney Samson and Tony Cha Cha — Get on the Floor (Nicky Romero Remix)
- DJ Jean — Play That Beat (Nicky Romero Mix)
- Pizetta featuring Reagadelica — Klezmer (Nicky Romero Remix)
- Quintino featuring Mitch Crown — Heaven (Nicky Romero Remix)
- Firebeatz and Apster — Skandelous (Nicky Romero Remix)
- DJ Rose — Twisted (Nicky Romero Remix)
- Quintin vs. DJ Jean — Original Dutch (Nicky Romero Remix)
- Michael Mendoza featuring I Fan — Be Without You (Nicky Romero Remix)
- DJ Jose — Like That (Nicky Romero Bigroom Remix)

2010

- Ian Carey featuring Michelle Shellers — Keep on Rising (Nicky Romero Remix)
- Hardwell and Funkadelic — Get Down Girl (Nicky Romero Remix)
- Sol Noir — Superstring (Nicky Romero Remix)
- Sivana — Confusion (Nicky Romero Radio Edit)
- Grooveyard — Mary Go Wild (Nicky Romero Remix)
- Housequake — People Are People (Nicky Romero Remix)
- Fedde Le Grand featuring Mitch Crown — Rockin' High (Nicky Romero Remix)
- DJ Jesus Luz and Alexandra Prince — Dangerous (Nicky Romero Festival Mix)
- Ned Shepard — Chromatic (Nicky Romero & Nilson Remix)
- Green Velvet — Flash (Nicky Romero Remix)

2011

- Flo Rida — Turn Around (5,4,3,2,1) (Nicky Romero Remix)
- David Guetta featuring Flo Rida and Nicki Minaj — Where Them Girls At (Nicky Romero Remix)
- Enrique Iglesias and Usher featuring Lil Wayne — Dirty Dancer (Nicky Romero Club Mix)
- Junkie XL — Molly's E (Nicky Romero Dub Remix)
- David Guetta featuring Usher — Without You (Nicky Romero Remix)
- Erick Morillo and Eddie Thoneick featuring Shawnee Taylor — Stronger (Nicky Romero Remix)
- David Guetta featuring Sia — Titanium (Nicky Romero Remix)
- Tonite Only — Haters Gonna Hate (Nicky Romero 'Out of Space' Remix)
- Kelly Clarkson — What Doesn't Kill You (Stronger) (Nicky Romero Remix)
- Daft Punk — Aerodynamic (Nicky Romero Bootleg)

2012

- Madonna featuring Nicki Minaj and M.I.A. — Give Me All Your Luvin' (Nicky Romero Remix)
- Eva Simons — I Don't Like You (Nicky Romero Remix)
- Anakyn — Point Blank (Nicky Romero Edit)

2013

- Ludacris featuring David Guetta and Usher – Rest of My Life (Nicky Romero Remix)
- Calvin Harris featuring Ellie Goulding – I Need Your Love (Nicky Romero Remix)
- Zedd featuring Hayley Williams – Stay The Night (Nicky Romero Remix)
- R3hab and Lucky Date – Rip It Up (Nicky Romero Edit)

2014

- John Christian — Next Level (Nicky Romero Edit)
- Cygnus X — Superstring (Nicky Romero 2014 Rework)

2015

- One Direction — 18 (Nicky Romero Remix)
- Magnificence and Alec Maire featuring Brooke Forman — Heartbeat (Nicky Romero Edit)

2017

- Martin Garrix and David Guetta featuring Jamie Scott and Romy Dya — So Far Away (Nicky Romero Remix)
- Linkin Park featuring Kiiara — Heavy (Nicky Romero Remix)
- Trilane and YARO featuring Max Landry — Miss Out (Nicky Romero Edit)
- Stadiumx and Taylr Renee — Howl at the Moon (Nicky Romero Remix)
- SWACQ — Love (Nicky Romero Edit)
- The Chainsmokers — Young (Nicky Romero Remix)

2018

- Nicky Romero with Rozes — Where Would We Be (Nicky Romero Edit)
- Afrojack and Jewelz & Sparks — One More Day (Nicky Romero Remix)
- Nicky Romero and Taio Cruz — Me on You (Nicky Romero Edit)
- Martin Garrix featuring Mike Yung — Dreamer (Nicky Romero Remix)
- Jess Glynne — Thursday (Nicky Romero Remix)
- Steve Aoki featuring Ina Wroldsen — Lie to Me (Nicky Romero Remix)

2019

- Kygo and Rita Ora — Carry On (Nicky Romero Remix)
- David Guetta featuring Raye — Stay (Don't Go Away) (Nicky Romero Remix)
- Trilane — Never Forget (Nicky Romero Edit)
- Armin van Buuren featuring Ne-Yo — Unlove You (Nicky Romero Remix)

2020

- Martin Garrix featuring Clinton Kane — "Drown" (Nicky Romero Edit)
- Robin Schulz featuring Alida — "In Your Eyes" (Nicky Romero Remix)
- Teamworx, Mr. Sid and George Z — "Techno" (Nicky Romero Edit)
- Nicky Romero — "Toulouse" (2020 Edit)
- Afrojack and David Guetta — "Hero" (Nicky Romero Remix)
- John Dahlbäck — "Pyramid" (Nicky Romero Remix)

2023

- Bebe Rexha — "Heart Wants What It Wants" (Nicky Romero Remix)
- Calvin Harris and Ellie Goulding — "Miracle" (Nicky Romero Remix)

2024

- Calvin Harris and Ellie Goulding — "Free" (Nicky Romero Remix)

2025

- Marshmello, Ellie Goulding and Avaion — "Save My Love" (Nicky Romero Remix)
- David Guetta, Tones and I, Teddy Swims — "Gone Gone Gone" (Nicky Romero Remix)
- Armin van Buuren, Alok, Norma Jean Martine, LAWRENT — "Euphoria" (Nicky Romero Remix)
