= Creep City =

Creep City may refer to:

- "Creep City", a song on Jake Shears (album) (2018)
- "Creep City", a song on Phantom and the Ghost (2014)
