= Collateral (album) =

Studio album by Nervo
- Released: 24 July 2015
- Recorded: 2011–2015
- Genre: Dance; EDM
- Length: 53:37
- Label: Ultra
- Producer: Nervo; Nicky Romero; R3hab; Fabian Lenssen; ZROQ; Ivan Gough; Jeremy "Jebu" Bunawan; Autoerotique; Fred Falke; Nile Rodgers; Hook N Sling; Steve Aoki; Afrojack; Adrian Lux; Matt Schwartz; Tim Bergling

Alternative cover
- Japanese version cover

Singles from Collateral
- 1. "We're All No One" Released: 2 September 2011; 2. "You're Gonna Love Again" Released: 4 June 2012; 3. "Reason" Released: 10 September 2012; 4. "Hold On" Released: 9 April 2013; 5. "Rise Early Morning" Released: 1 December 2014; 6. "It Feels" Released: 23 February 2015; 7. "Haute Mess" Released: 27 April 2015; 8. "Hey Ricky" Released: July 2015; 9. "The Other Boys" Released: 23 October 2015; 10. "Bulletproof" Released: March 2016; 11. "Let It Go" Released: May 2016; 12. "Did We Forget" Released: 20 June 2016

Professional ratings
Review scores
Source	Rating
Renowned for Sound	3/5 stars
Rolling Stone	3.5/5 stars
We Got This Covered	3.5/5 stars

Collateral is the debut studio album by the Australian twin duo Nervo. It was released by Ultra Records on 24 July 2015.

== Track listing ==
Collateral standard version track listing
No.	Title	Writer(s)	Producer(s)	Length
1.	"Bulletproof" (featuring Harrison Miya)	Miriam Nervo; Olivia Nervo; Nick Rotteveel; Marcus van Wattum	Nervo; Nicky Romero	3:18
2.	"Hold On"	M. Nervo; O. Nervo; Fabian Lenssen; Fadil El Ghoul; Ferruccio Tebaldi; ZROQ	Nervo; Fabian Lenssen; R3hab; ZROQ	3:00
3.	"Did We Forget" (featuring Amba Shepherd)	M. Nervo; O. Nervo; Dave Henderson; Keith Robertson	Nervo; Autoerotique	4:10
4.	"Oh Diana"	M. Nervo; O. Nervo; Justin Bates	Nervo	3:20
5.	"Haute Mess"	M. Nervo; O. Nervo; Ivan Gough; Jeremy "Jebu" Bunawan	Nervo; Ivan Gough (co.); Jeremy "Jebu" Bunawan (co.)	2:49
6.	"Hey Ricky" (featuring Kreayshawn, Dev and Alisa)	M. Nervo; O. Nervo; Gough; Bunawan; Natassia Zolot; Devin Tailes	Nervo; Gough (add.); Bunawan (add.)	3:03
7.	"Let It Go" (featuring Nicky Romero)	M. Nervo; O. Nervo; Rotteveel; van Wattum	Nervo; Romero	3:25
8.	"Rainham Road"	M. Nervo; O. Nervo	Nervo	3:16
9.	"Rise Early Morning" (featuring Au Revoir Simone)	M. Nervo; O. Nervo; Lenssen; ZROQ	Nervo; Lenssen; ZROQ	3:20
10.	"The Other Boys" (featuring Kylie Minogue, Jake Shears and Nile Rodgers)	M. Nervo; O. Nervo; Rodgers; Fred Falke	Nervo; Fred Falke (add.); Nile Rodgers (add.)	4:56
11.	"Reason" (with Hook N Sling)	M. Nervo; O. Nervo; Anthony Maniscalco	Nervo; Hook N Sling	3:33
12.	"Right Thru Me" (featuring J Park)	M. Nervo; O. Nervo; Bates	Nervo	3:07
13.	"You're Gonna Love Again"	M. Nervo; O. Nervo; Tim Bergling	Nervo; Tim Bergling; Matt Schwartz (add.)	3:21
14.	"We're All No One" (Nervo Goes to Paris Remix; featuring Steve Aoki and Afrojack)	M. Nervo; O. Nervo; Aoki; Nick van de Wall	Nervo (and remixer); Steve Aoki; Afrojack	5:41
15.	"It Feels"	M. Nervo; O. Nervo; Charlie Bernardo; Prinz Adrian Johannes Hynne	Nervo; Adrian Lux; Schwartz	3:18
Total length:				53:37

Collateral Japanese edition bonus tracks
No.	Title	Length
16.	"Revolution" (with R3hab and Ummet Ozcan)
17.	"Like Home" (with Nicky Romero)

Collateral Japanese edition DVD
No.	Title	Length
1.	"Rise Early Morning" (featuring Au Revoir Simone; video)
2.	"It Feels" (video)
3.	"Haute Mess" (video)
4.	"Hey Ricky" (featuring Kreayshawn, Dev and Alisa; video)
5.	"Let It Go" (featuring Nicky Romero; video)

== Charts ==
Chart performance for Collateral
Chart (2015)	Peak position
Japanese Albums (Oricon)	167
US Top Dance Albums (Billboard)	14
US Heatseekers Albums (Billboard)	21

== Release history ==
Release history and formats for Collateral
Region	Date	Format	Label	Ref.
Various	24 July 2015	Digital download	Ultra Music	
Japan	5 August 2015	CD; CD+DVD	Avex Group	
Australia	7 August 2015	CD	Ultra Music	
