= Quintino =

- Gender: Male

Origin
- Origin: Latin
- Meaning: the fifth

Other names
- Derived: Quintinus
- Related names: see below

Quintino (Latin Quintinus, from Quintus) is a Latin-derived male given name meaning "the fifth".

== People ==
- Quintino Bocaiuva - Brazilian journalist and politician
- Quintino Vilas Boas Neto - Portuguese artist
- Quintino de Lacerda - Brazilian politician
- José Quintino Dias - Portuguese historical person
- Tomás Quintino Antunes - Portuguese journalist
- Quintino (DJ) - Dutch disc jockey (real name Quinten van den Berg)
- Aldo Quintino - American Actor

== Places ==
- Quintino Bocaiuva (Rio de Janeiro) - neighborhood of Rio de Janeiro
- Quintino Cunha - neighborhood of Fortaleza, Ceará
- Quintino Facci - neighborhood of Ribeirão Preto, São Paulo
- Quintino (Timbó) - neighborhood of Timbó, São Paulo
- Santo Quintino - borough (freguesia) of Sobral de Monte Agraço, Portugal
- Quintinos - borough of Carmo do Paranaíba, Minas Gerais, Brasil.

== Other ==
- Decididos de Quintino, Aliados de Quintino e Aliança de Quintino - historical carnival associations of Brazil.
- Igreja de São Quintino - historic Portuguese church.

== See also ==
- Quentin (disambiguation)
