= People Grinnin' =

Single by Nervo featuring the Child of Lov
- Released: 14 July 2016
- Recorded: 2016
- Genre: Pop; electro house
- Length: 3:05 (radio edit)
- Label: Big Beat/Atlantic/WMG
- Songwriter(s): Miriam Nervo; Olivia Nervo; Martijn William Zimri Teerlinck
- Producer(s): Nervo

Nervo singles chronology
"Did We Forget" (2016)	"People Grinnin'" (2016)	"Anywhere You Go" (2016)

The Child of Lov singles chronology
"People Grinnin'" (2016)

"People Grinnin'" is a song by the Australian duo Nervo, which features the vocals of the Child of Lov, who died in 2013. The song was released as a single on 14 July 2016 and reached number one on the US Billboard Dance Club Songs Chart during the week ending 3 December 2016.

The track and its music video (which is part of their "Made by Me" campaign to help address the gender disparity and skills shortage in the field of engineering) is dedicated to women pursuing a career in the world of technology, and was inspired by their experiences in this field. In an interview with Your EDM, the sisters explain how they came up with the song: "When we studied engineering, we were the only girls in the class. So when we were approached to get behind this project it just made sense. We loved the chance to show the world that there is engineering in every aspect of our lives. We're sound engineers but our whole show is only made possible through expert engineering. From the makeup we wear to the lights and the stage we perform on; engineering makes it all possible, including the music we make."

== Track listing ==
Digital download
No.	Title	Length
1.	"People Grinnin'" (featuring the Child of Lov)	3:05

Beatport exclusive Extended Mix
No.	Title	Length
1.	"People Grinnin'" (featuring the Child of Lov; extended mix)	4:15

Remixes Part 1
No.	Title	Length
1.	"People Grinnin'" (featuring the Child of Lov; Erick Morillo Remix)	7:33
2.	"People Grinnin'" (featuring the Child of Lov; Regilio Remix)	3:55
3.	"People Grinnin'" (featuring the Child of Lov; Audiorockers Remix)	4:01
4.	"People Grinnin'" (featuring the Child of Lov; Kyodee & the Wulf Remix)	4:15
5.	"People Grinnin'" (featuring the Child of Lov; Skltone Remix)	4:18
6.	"People Grinnin'" (featuring the Child of Lov; Mowe Remix)	3:41
Total length:		27:43

Remixes Part 2
No.	Title	Length
1.	"People Grinnin'" (featuring the Child of Lov; Calvo Remix)	4:27
2.	"People Grinnin'" (featuring the Child of Lov; Jolyon Petch Remix)	4:27
3.	"People Grinnin'" (featuring the Child of Lov; Brian Cross Remix)	5:06
4.	"People Grinnin'" (featuring the Child of Lov; Baut Remix)	4:11
5.	"People Grinnin'" (featuring the Child of Lov; Juke Remix)	3:32
6.	"People Grinnin'" (featuring the Child of Lov; Freakhouze Remix)	5:07
7.	"People Grinnin'" (featuring the Child of Lov; John J-C Carr Remix)	4:12
Total length:		31:02

== Charts ==
Chart performance for "People Grinnin'"
Chart (2016)	Peak position
US Dance Club Songs (Billboard)	1
