= Ummet Ozcan =

Dutch DJ and record producer (born 1982)

- Born: Ummet Ozcan; 16 August 1982 (age 44); Putten, Gelderland, Netherlands
- Genres: Electro house, big room house, progressive house, techno, hardstyle, tech trance (early)
- Occupations: Disc jockey, record producer, sound designer, record label owner
- Instruments: Piano, guitar, synthesizer, turntables, FL Studio, Tuvan throat singing
- Years active: 2006–present
- Label: Spinnin'
- Website: ummetozcan.com

Ummet Ozcan (Note: Turkish: Ümmet Özcan, pronounced [ymˈmet øzˈdʒan]) (born 16 August 1982) is a Dutch DJ and producer, specializing in the techno genre. In the past he has produced mainly big room house and electro house.

== Life and career ==
Ummet Ozcan is the son of Turkish parents; he was born and grew up in the Netherlands. He says that his Turkish background only unconsciously and barely recognizably influences his music, but he still considers Turkey as his country.

His releases signed to Spinnin' Records are supported by DJs like Sander van Doorn, Armin van Buuren, Tiësto, Calvin Harris and Hardwell. Özcan is also known for his softsynth and soundbank design for music software houses such as Rob Papen (Albino, Predator) and for hardware units such as the Access Virus.

His hits include "TimeWave Zero" and "Arcadia" on Doorn Records and "Shamballa" on Reset Records, all sublabels of Spinnin' Records. In his early years, Özcan produced techno-influenced trance music for release under Reset Records. After nearly five years, Ummet's production shifted focus towards the electronic dance music movement.

In late 2012, he started performing big room house alongside Dimitri Vegas & Like Mike and R3hab for release on the main Spinnin label. In recent years he dedicated himself to other sub-genres and gradually quit big room house. He produced remixes for worldwide known artists such as Tiësto ("Wasted") and Axwell & Ingrosso ("More Than You Know").

== Discography ==
=== Extended plays ===
- 2020: Alter Ego (as Baas) [OZ Records / Spinnin']
- 2023: Shaman EP [OZ Records]

=== Singles ===
==== As lead artist ====
List of singles as lead artist, with selected chart positions, showing year released and album name

Title	Year	Peak chart positions					Certifications
Title	Year	NLD	BEL	FRA	SWE	UK	Certifications
"The Code" (with W&W)	2013	94	—	—	—	—	
"Revolution" (with R3hab and NERVO)	2013	—	76	163	—	37	
"Raise Your Hands"	2014	—	47	96	—	—	
"Smash!"	2014	—	65	—	—	—	
"SuperWave"	2014	—	101	—	—	—	
"The Hum" (vs. Dimitri Vegas & Like Mike)	2015	—	1	60	—	—	BEA: Platinum
"Lose Control"	2015	—	—	—	—	—	
"On the Run"	2015	—	—	—	—	—	
"Change My Heart" (with Laurell)	2018	—	—	—	54	—	
"—" denotes a recording that did not chart or was not released in that territory.

=== Other charted songs ===
Title	Year	Peak chart positions	
Title	Year	NLD	BEL
"Melody" (Dimitri Vegas & Like Mike and Steve Aoki vs. Ummet Ozcan))	2016	—	12
"—" denotes a recording that did not chart or was not released.

=== Other singles ===
- 2007 Ummet Ozcan – Joypad [Blue Chip]
- 2007 Ummet Ozcan – The Light [Beatproviders]
- 2007 ElToro and Ummet Ozcan – Re-Charge [Beatproviders]
- 2007 Ummet Ozcan – Natural Waves [Work Hard Play Hard Holland]
- 2008 Ummet Ozcan – Deep Basic [Beatproviders]
- 2008 El Toro and Ummet Ozcan – Bits And Bytes [Beatproviders]
- 2009 Ummet Ozcan – Maya [Liquid]
- 2009 Ummet Ozcan – Timewave Zero [Doorn / Spinnin']
- 2009 Ummet Ozcan – Shamballa [Reset]
- 2009 MEM and Ummet Ozcan – Subzero [Beatproviders]
- 2009 Ummet Ozcan vs. W&W – Synergy [Reset]
- 2010 Ummet Ozcan – Insignia [Reset]
- 2010 Ummet Ozcan – Arcadia [Doorn / Spinnin']
- 2010 Sied van Riel and Ummet Ozcan – Serendipity [Reset]
- 2010 Ummet Ozcan – Trinity [Reset]
- 2010 Ummet Ozcan – Next Phase [Reset]
- 2010 Ummet Ozcan – Vimana [Reset]
- 2011 Ummet Ozcan – Insignia [Reset]
- 2011 Ummet Ozcan – Indigo [Reset]
- 2011 Ummet Ozcan – Transcend [Liquid]
- 2011 Ummet Ozcan – Reboot [Doorn / Spinnin']
- 2012 Ummet Ozcan – Cocoon [Reset]
- 2012 Ummet Ozcan – Miami Sundown [Reset]
- 2012 Ummet Ozcan – The Box [Reset]
- 2013 W&W and Ummet Ozcan – The Code [Revealed]
- 2013 Ummet Ozcan – Here & Now [Spinnin']
- 2013 Ummet Ozcan and DJ Ghost – Airport [Spinnin']
- 2013 Ummet Ozcan – The Cube [Spinnin']
- 2013 R3hab, Nervo and Ummet Ozcan – Revolution [Spinnin'] UK #38
- 2014 Ummet Ozcan – Raise Your Hands [Spinnin']
- 2014 Ummet Ozcan – Smash! [Spinnin']
- 2014 Ummet Ozcan – SuperWave [Spinnin]
- 2014 Calvin Harris and Ummet Ozcan – Overdrive [Fly Eye]
- 2014 Calvin Harris and Ummet Ozcan – Overdrive (Part 2) [Fly Eye]
- 2015 Dimitri Vegas & Like Mike and Ummet Ozcan – The Hum [Smash The House]
- 2015 Ummet Ozcan – Lose Control [Spinnin']
- 2015 Ummet Ozcan featuring Katt Niall – Stars [Spinnin']
- 2015 Ummet Ozcan – Kensei [Spinnin']
- 2015 Ummet Ozcan – On The Run [Spinnin']
- 2016 Ummet Ozcan – Wake Up The Sun [Spinnin']
- 2016 Ummet Ozcan – Spacecats [Spinnin']
- 2016 Dimitri Vegas, Like Mike and Steve Aoki vs. Ummet Ozcan – Melody [Smash The House]
- 2016 Tiesto and Ummet Ozcan – What You're Waiting For [Musical Freedom / Spinnin']
- 2016 Ummet Ozcan – Wickerman [Musical Freedom]
- 2016 Ummet Ozcan – Megatron [Spinnin']
- 2016 Ummet Ozcan – Don't Stop [Spinnin']
- 2016 Ummet Ozcan – Om Telolet Om [Free]
- 2017 Ummet Ozcan featuring Ambush – Bombjack [Spinnin']
- 2017 Ummet Ozcan vs. Dimitri Vegas & Like Mike – Jaguar [Free]
- 2017 Ummet Ozcan – Showdown [Spinnin']
- 2017 Ummet Ozcan featuring Chris Crone – Everything Changes [Spinnin']
- 2017 Ummet Ozcan and Lucas & Steve – Higher [Spinnin']
- 2017 Ummet Ozcan vs. Michael Jackson – Smooth Criminal [Free]
- 2018 Ummet Ozcan – Krypton [OZ Records / Spinnin']
- 2018 HYO feat. Ummet Ozcan – Sober [Scream Records]
- 2018: Ummet Ozcan and Laurell – Change My Heart [Spinnin']
- 2018: Ummet Ozcan – Omnia [OZ Records / Spinnin']
- 2018: Ummet Ozcan and Coone featuring Villain- Trash Moment [OZ Records / Spinnin']
- 2018: Ummet Ozcan and War – Low Rider [SPRS / Spinnin']
- 2018: Ummet Ozcan – The Cell [OZ Records / Spinnin']
- 2018: Ummet Ozcan and Pollyanna – Starchild [Spinnin']
- 2019: Ummet Ozcan – The Grid [OZ Records / Spinnin']
- 2019: Ummet Ozcan featuring Mo-Do – Eins Zwei [OZ Records / Spinnin']
- 2019: Ummet Ozcan, Arem Ozguc and Arman Aydin – Izmir [Spinnin']
- 2019: Ummet Ozcan – I Don't Care (featuring Robin Valo) [Spinnin']
- 2019: Dimitri Vegas & Like Mike, Ummet Ozcan and Brennan Heart – "Beast (All As One)" [Smash The House]
- 2019: Steve Aoki, Ummet Ozcan and Dzeko – "Popcorn" [Ultra Records]
- 2020: Ummet Ozcan and Harris & Ford – "Fight Back" [Spinnin']
- 2020: Ummet Ozcan – "Seesaw" [Spinnin']
- 2020: Ummet Ozcan and Le Shuuk – "Toast Hawaii" [OZ Records / Spinnin']
- 2020: Ummet Ozcan – "Underdog" [OZ Records / Spinnin']
- 2020: Ummet Ozcan and Faustix – "Angry Kids" [Spinnin']
- 2020: Ummet Ozcan and Jaxx & Vega – "Somewhere in My Memory (Home Alone Theme)" [Smash The House]
- 2020: Ummet Ozcan, Charly Lownoise & Mental Theo, Orange INC – "Wonderful Days" [Spinnin']
- 2021: Ummet Ozcan featuring Mila Falls – "The Moment" [Spinnin']
- 2021: Ummet Ozcan featuring Linney – "Porcelain" [Spinnin']
- 2021: Ummet Ozcan and Harris & Ford – "Million Dreams" [Spinnin']
- 2021: Ummet Ozcan featuring Ili – "Strange World" [Spinnin']
- 2021: Ummet Ozcan – "Reborn" [Spinnin']
- 2022: Ummet Ozcan – "Gargantua" [Spinnin']
- 2023: Altay, with Otyken
