= Razor Boy Music Publishing =

Swedish music publishing company

Razor Boy
- Genre: Privately held company
- Founded: 1 June 2008 (18 years ago)
- Headquarters: Stockholm, Sweden
- Key people: Fredrik Olsson; Anders Bagge
- Services: Music publishing, management
- Website: razorboymusicpub.com

Razor Boy Music Publishing is a Swedish independent music publishing company, established on 1 June 2008.

== Company profile ==
Founded and owned by Fredrik Olsson, who is managing the day-to-day operations creatively and administratively, Anders Bagge is a silent partner/co-owner. Razor Boy has since the start contracted a number of talented songwriters, who have achieved global success.

Songwriters signed to Razor Boy include Mim and Liv Nervo (a.k.a. The Nervo Twins), who have written hits, including "When Love Takes Over" by David Guetta featuring Kelly Rowland, as well as numerous songs with other major acts, including Kesha, Kylie Minogue, Pussycat Dolls, Miley Cyrus, and Armin van Buuren.

Jo Perry is another songwriter known for singles with Loick Essien, Peter Andre, Cheryl Cole and Union J. Perry has written all songs for the girl group Stooshe as well, including their debut song "Love Me" (featuring Travie McCoy) and "Black Heart", which later became one of the biggest hits of 2012/2013 in the UK.

Didrik Thott is a songwriter whose merits include tracks with many international stars, including Celine Dion, Westlife, Namie Amuro, Exile, Armin van Buuren.

Razor Boy also has another ten songwriters and producers work in the catalogue with cuts worldwide.

Since its start in 2008, Razor Boy has achieved numerous number-one singles and albums in the US, UK, Japan, Germany and various countries around the world.

== Selected published songs ==
- David Guetta feat. Kelly Rowland – "When Love Takes Over" (publisher)
- David Guetta feat. Kelly Rowland – "It's the Way You Love Me" (publisher)
- David Guetta – "Sound of Letting Go" (publisher)
- Kesha – "Boots and Boy" (publisher)
- Kesha – "VIP" (publisher)
- Cheryl Cole – "Only Human" (publisher)
- Kylie Minogue – "Put Your Hands Up (If You Feel Love)" (publisher)
- Stooshe – "Black Heart" (publisher)
- Stooshe – "Love Me" (publisher)
- Stooshe – "Slip" (publisher)
- Stooshe – "London with the Lights On" (publisher)
- Celine Dion – "Shadow of Love" (publisher)
- Union J – "Beautiful Life" (publisher)
- Allison Iraheta – "Don`t Waste the Pretty" (publisher)
- Charice – "Nothing" (publisher)
- Armin van Buuren feat. Sophie Ellis Bextor – "Not Giving Up on Love" (publisher)
- Armin van Buuren – "Broken Tonight" (publisher)
- Armin van Buuren feat. Nadia Ali – "Feels So Good" (publisher)
- Armina van Buuren feat. Laura V – "Drowning" (publisher)
- Kumi Koda – "Bambi" (publisher)
- Exile – "Rising Sun" (publisher)
- Kat-Tun – "Cosmic Child" (publisher)
- Kat-Tun – "My Secret" (publisher)
- Kat-Tun – "Dangerous" (publisher)
- Hey Say Jump – "Jump Around the World" (publisher)
- Girls Generation – "Library" (publisher)
- Girls Generation – "All My Love Is for You" (publisher)
- Girls Generation – "Flyers" (publisher)
- Namie Amuro – "Hot Girls" (publisher)
- Namie Amuro – "Only You" (publisher)
- Namie Amuro – "In the Spotlight (Tokyo)" (publisher)
- EXO – "3.6.5" (publisher)
