= Last Man Dancing =

Studio album by Jake Shears
- Released: June 2, 2023
- Genre: Disco-pop; acid house
- Length: 50:03
- Label: Boys Keep Swinging; Mute
- Producer: Ryland Blackinton; Le Chev; Vaughn Oliver; Alexander Ridha; Jake Shears

Jake Shears chronology
Jake Shears (2018)	Last Man Dancing (2023)

Singles from Last Man Dancing
- 1. "Too Much Music" Released: February 2, 2023; 2. "Devil Came Down the Dance Floor" Released: March 23, 2023; 3. "I Used to Be in Love" Released: April 19, 2023; 4. "Last Man Dancing" Released: May 23, 2023

Last Man Dancing is the second studio album by American singer Jake Shears, released on June 2, 2023, through Boys Keep Swinging and Mute Records. It includes collaborations with Kylie Minogue, Le Chev, Amber Martin and Big Freedia, and contributions from Jane Fonda and Iggy Pop. It was preceded by the release of four singles, including "Too Much Music", released alongside the album announcement on February 2.

== Background ==
The album began with and was built around Shears's and Kylie Minogue's collaboration "Voices", which was recorded in 2018. At the time Shears had "nowhere for it to go" as he was "making a southern, Honky-tonk record"—his self-titled debut album, and Minogue was making Golden. Shears stated that another of his inspirations was that "intimacy is missing from nightlife. The only way to replace that is to do it yourself. That's where [his] head was at with this record." Shears announced the album on February 2, 2023.

The album's first single, "Too Much Music", received heavy rotation on BBC Radio 2 and Shears performed in several media outlets. It charted on the component Singles Sales and Singles Download charts at number 27. The album debuted and peaked at number 18 on the Official Album Charts and entered the top ten in several component independent charts.

== Critical reception ==
Professional ratings
Aggregate scores
Source	Rating
Metacritic	84/100
Review scores
Source	Rating
AllMusic	4/5 stars
The Line of Best Fit	8/10
musicOMH	4.5/5 stars
NME	4/5 stars
DIY	3.5/5 stars

Last Man Dancing received a score of 84 out of 100 on review aggregator Metacritic based on five critics' reviews, indicating "universal acclaim". Heather Phares of AllMusic called it Shears's return to "dance music old and new", writing that he "still finds ways to make club-oriented music that's equally catchy and innovative" and that its "immaculately crafted tracks offer an impressive amount of range" as well as an "abundance of style and imagination". Writing for NME, Gary Ryan opined that it is Shears's "most cohesive attempt to merge th[e] two identities" of "an artist who straddles both the mainstream and the margins", noting that it is also "pure escapism and his most effortless-sounding set since bursting out of the traps nearly 20 years ago".

Like Phares, Michael Hubbard of musicOMH noted the album's two distinct halves, on both of which he felt Shears "offers his hand and guides us expertly through a hedonistic kaleidoscope of disco-pop homage, gay icons, convivial singalongs and, most surprisingly, an outrageously slapping run of bona fide future club classics of his own". Hubbard concluded by calling the album an "essential, repeatable work". Reviewing the album for The Line of Best Fit, David Cobbald described it as "a party to escape to when life gets a little bit too much, and it delivers on its mission statement with abundance", including both "slick disco production" in its first half and "deeper electronic sounds" with "each song blend[ing] seamlessly into the next as though it's being mixed by a DJ at the house party" in its second.

== Track listing ==
Last Man Dancing track listing
No.	Title	Writer(s)	Producer(s)	Length
1.	"Too Much Music"	Jason Sellards; Ryland Blackinton; Vaughn Oliver; Dominic Thomas	Blackinton; Oliver	4:38
2.	"Do the Television"	Sellards; Scott Hoffman; Ana Lynch; Oliver	Blackinton; Oliver	4:38
3.	"Voices" (featuring Kylie Minogue)	Sellards; Oliver Goldstein; Kylie Minogue; Oliver	Blackinton; Oliver	4:26
4.	"I Used to Be in Love"	Sellards; Michael Cheever; Alexander Ridha	Ridha	3:28
5.	"Really Big Deal"	Sellards; Stephen Oremus	Jake Shears; Blackinton	2:52
6.	"Last Man Dancing"	Sellards; Cheever; Ridha	Le Chev; Ridha^{[a]}	4:51
7.	"8 Ball" (featuring Le Chev)	Sellards; Cheever; Ridha	Le Chev; Ridha	4:30
8.	"Devil Came Down the Dance Floor" (featuring Amber Martin)	Sellards; Cheever; Amber Martin; Ridha	Le Chev; Ridha	3:44
9.	"Mess of Me"	Sellards; Ridha	Ridha	4:14
10.	"Doses" (featuring Big Freedia)	Sellards; Suzannah Powell; Ridha; Freddie Ross	Ridha	2:54
11.	"Radio Eyes"	Sellards; Cheever; Ridha	Ridha; Blackinton^{[a]}	5:29
12.	"Diamonds Don't Burn"	Sellards; Cheever	Le Chev	4:19
Total length:				50:03

Note

- ^{^[a]} signifies an additional producer.

Last Man Dancing (Digital "Devilishly Delicious Deluxe Dance Floor Edition")
No.	Title	Length
13.	"Meltdown"	2:53
14.	"Do the Television" (Totally Enormous Extinct Dinosaurs' Primetime Mix)	5:05
15.	"Too Much Music" (Lauer Remix)	4:35
16.	"I Used To Be In Love" (YAME Remix)	6:26
17.	"Meltdown" (Crush Club 12" Extended Mix)	5:43
18.	"Last Man Dancing" (Hifi Sean Remix)	3:04
19.	"Too Much Music" (The Reflex Revision)	7:06
Total length:		84:55

== Last Man Dancing Remixes EP ==
Several remixes from Last Man Dancing tracks and singles were released between April and September 2023. On October 13, Shears released an eight track EP containing all of them via Mute Records. All releases contained pictures of his late dog Toby (Nov. 2007-Mar. 2023) in the set for the album's artwork photoshoot. Remixers include album collaborators Big Freedia and Le Chev plus other guests such as Hifi Sean, YAME, Lauer, Erol Alkan and The Reflex.

No.	Title	Length
1.	"Doses" (Erol Alkan Rework)	5:39
2.	"Last Man Dancing" (Hifi Sean Cosmic Disco Mix)	3:04
3.	"I Used to Be in Love" (YAME Remix)	6:26
4.	"Too Much Music" (Lauer Remix)	4:35
5.	"I Used to Be in Love" (Le Chev Remix)	5:33
6.	"Too Much Music" (The Reflex Revision)	7:06
7.	"Doses" (Erol Alkan Rework Dub)	5:39
8.	"Last Man Dancing" (Hifi Sean Cosmic Disco Dub)	6:52
Total length:		44:56

== Personnel ==
- Mike Marsh – mastering
- Ryland Blackinton – mixing (tracks 1–3, 5)
- Vaughn Oliver – mixing (1–3)
- Alexander Ridha – mixing (4, 6–11)
- Carlos Alomar – guitar (1)
- Kylie Minogue – vocals (3)
- Craig Phunder – guitar (6)
- Jake Shears – artwork concept
- Rich Andrews – art direction, design
- Edward Cooke – photography
- Phoebe Shakespeare – set design

== Charts ==
Chart performance for Last Man Dancing
Chart (2023)	Peak position
Belgian Albums (Ultratop Wallonia)	197
Scottish Albums (OCC)	6
UK Albums (OCC)	18
UK Independent Albums (OCC)	4
