= Legacy (Nicky Romero and Krewella song) =

Single by Nicky Romero and Krewella
- Released: July 15, 2013
- Genre: Progressive house
- Length: 6:26
- Label: Protocol; Ultra
- Songwriters: Nick Rotteveel van Gotum; Jahan Yousaf; Yasmine Yousaf; Toby Gad
- Producers: Nicky Romero; Krewella

Nicky Romero singles chronology
"I Could Be the One" (2012)	"Legacy" (2013)	"Feet on the Ground" (2014)

Krewella singles chronology
"Enjoy the Ride" (2013)	"Legacy" (2013)	"Party Monster" (2013)

"Legacy", also titled "Legacy (Save My Life)", is a song by Dutch producer and DJ Nicky Romero and American electronic dance music band Krewella. The song was initially released on July 15, 2013, through Protocol Recordings via Beatport, where it topped the website's Top 100 chart on the same week. It was later released worldwide as a digital download on September 9, 2013.

== Music video ==
The music video premiered on YouTube on October 25, 2013. It was directed by Kyle Padilla and recorded late-August in Los Angeles.

== Track listing ==
Digital download

No.	Title	Length
1.	"Legacy (Radio Edit)"	3:12
2.	"Legacy"	6:26

The Remixes

No.	Title	Length
1.	"Legacy" (Candyland's OG Remix)	4:34
2.	"Legacy" (Don Diablo Remix) (featuring Sway)	3:22
3.	"Legacy" (Vicetone Remix)	5:37
4.	"Legacy" (Wildstylez Remix)	5:27
5.	"Legacy" (Kryder Remix)	4:36
6.	"Legacy" (Mike Candys Remix)	4:34

== Charts ==
=== Weekly charts ===
Chart (2014)	Peak position
Australia (ARIA)	44
US Hot Dance/Electronic Songs (Billboard)	22

=== Year-end charts ===
Chart (2014)	Position
US Hot Dance/Electronic Songs (Billboard)	80

== Release history ==
Region	Date	Label	Format	Release type
Netherlands	September 5, 2013	Spinnin' Records / Protocol Recordings	Digital download	2-track single
Worldwide	September 9, 2013	Protocol Recordings & Ultra Records	Digital download	1-track single (Radio Edit)
Canada	September 10, 2013	Protocol Recordings & Ultra Records	Digital download	1-track single (Radio Edit)
United States	October 8, 2013	Protocol Recordings & Ultra Records	Digital download	1-track single (Radio Edit)
United Kingdom	November 15, 2013	Protocol Recordings & Ultra Records	Digital download	6-track EP
Worldwide	November 18, 2013	Protocol Recordings & Ultra Records	Digital download	5-track EP (Remixes)
Canada	November 19, 2013	Protocol Recordings & Ultra Records	Digital download	5-track EP (Remixes)
United States	November 19, 2013	Protocol Recordings & Ultra Records	Digital download	5-track EP (Remixes)
Netherlands	March 20, 2014	Spinnin' Records / Protocol Recordings	Digital download	6-track EP (The Remixes)
