= Hold On (Nervo song) =

Single by Nervo

from the album Collateral
- Released: 9 April 2013
- Recorded: 2013
- Genre: Progressive house
- Length: 3:01 (radio edit)
- Label: Astralwerks
- Songwriter(s): Miriam Nervo; Olivia Nervo; Fadil El Ghoul; F. Lenssen
- Producer(s): Nervo; R3hab

Nervo singles chronology
"Like Home" (2012)	"Hold On" (2013)	"Revolution" (2014)

"Hold On" is a song by Australian twin sisters Nervo. The single was released digitally on 9 April 2013 and is included on their 2015 album, Collateral. Two additional remix extended plays were released in May and June 2013.

"Hold On" peaked at number one of the Hot Dance Club Songs in the United States for the week commencing 22 June 2013, making it Nervo's first number-one song on any chart.

== Critical reception ==
Magnetic Mag called the song "a deep, mood arousing vocal track that combines an atmospheric hook with a big room drop wrapped around that signature Nervo style of production. The pitch bent melody in correlation with the low-end kick and the contrasting intimate vocals makes this track almost impossible not to get into".

== Music video ==
A music video to accompany the release of "Hold On" was first released on YouTube on 19 April 2013.

== Track listing ==
Digital download
No.	Title	Length
1.	"Hold On" (radio edit)	3:01
Total length:		3:01

Remixes Part 1 (May 2013)
No.	Title	Length
1.	"Hold On" (Angger Dimas Remix)	5:33
2.	"Hold On" (Fred Falke Radio Remix)	3:46
3.	"Hold On" (Fred Falke Remix)	6:58
4.	"Hold On" (Loudpvck Remix)	4:08

Remixes Part 2 (June 2013)
No.	Title	Length
1.	"Hold On" (extended)	4:20
2.	"Hold On" (R3hab & Silvio Economo Remix)	4:55
3.	"Hold On" (Vicetone Extended Edit)	5:49
4.	"Hold On" (Dimension Remix)	4:59

== Chart performance ==
=== Weekly charts ===
Weekly chart performance for "Hold On"
Chart (2013–2021)	Peak position
Belgium (Ultratip Bubbling Under Wallonia)	37
Belgium Dance (Ultratop Wallonia)	29
Belgium Dance Bubbling Under (Ultratop Wallonia)	1
Slovakia (Rádio Top 100)	76
UK Singles (Official Charts Company)	182
US Dance Club Songs (Billboard)	1
US Hot Dance/Electronic Songs (Billboard)	23

=== Year-end charts ===
Year-end chart performance for "Hold On"
Chart (2013)	Position
US Hot Dance/Electronic Songs (Billboard)	63

== See also ==
- List of Billboard Dance Club Songs number ones of 2013
