= Igreja de São Quintino =

Church in Sobral de Monte Agraço, Portugal

Coordinates: 39.0058985°N 9.1461352°W

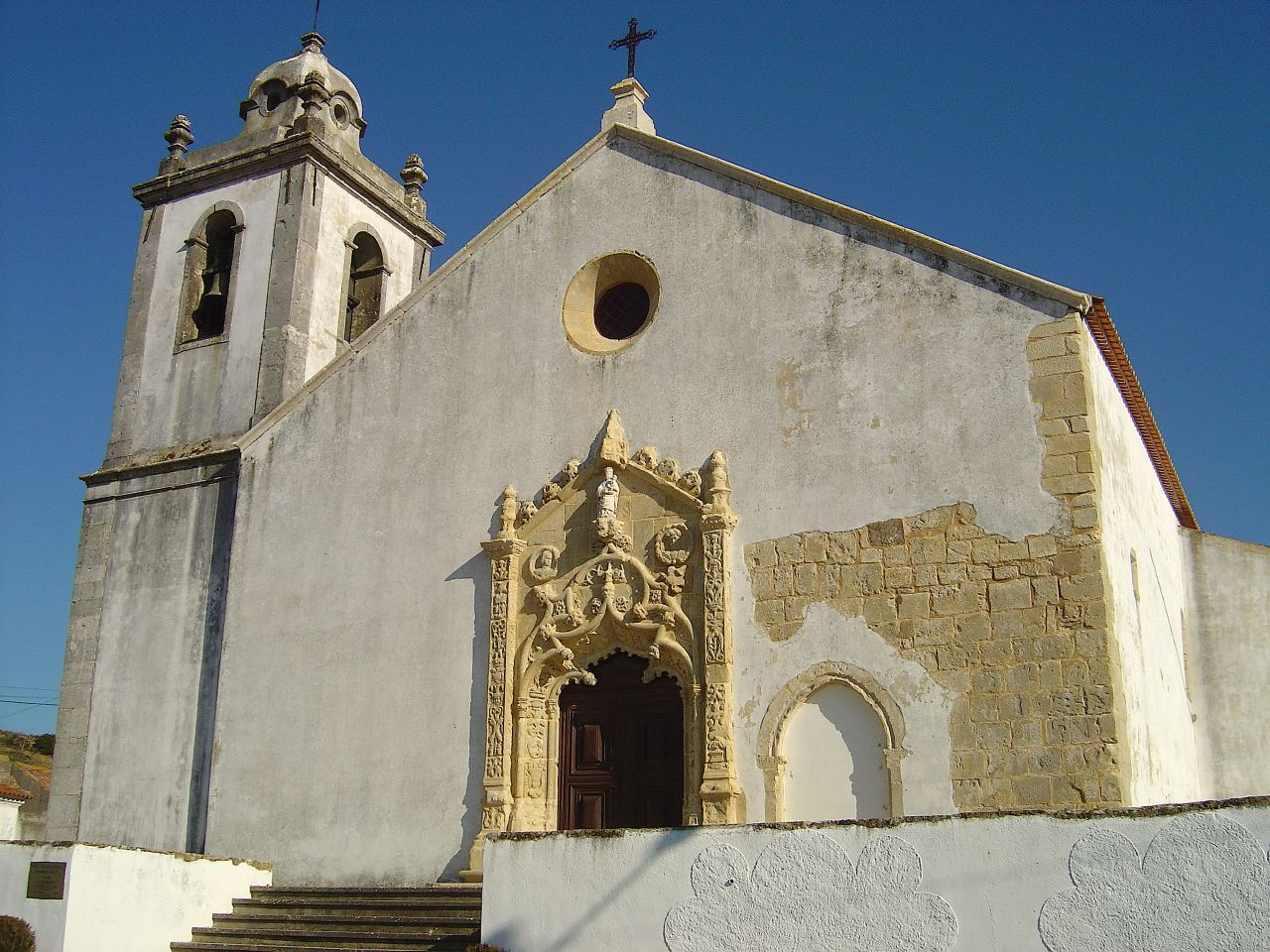
Santo Church. Quintino - Sobral de Monte. Agraç

Igreja de São Quintino is a church in Sobral de Monte Agraço, Portugal. It is classified as a National Monument.
