= Jake Shears =

American singer (born 1978)

- Shears in 2026

Background information
- Born: October 3, 1978 (age 48); Mesa, Arizona, U.S.
- Genres: Glam rock; alternative; pop
- Occupations: Singer; musician; songwriter; actor
- Instruments: Vocals; keyboards; guitar; flute
- Years active: 1999–2013, 2017–present
- Member of: Scissor Sisters

Jason F. Sellards (born October 3, 1978), known professionally by the stage name Jake Shears, is an American singer, songwriter, musician and actor. He is best known as the co-lead vocalist of New York City pop-rock band Scissor Sisters, who achieved considerable chart success in the 2000s before their indefinite hiatus in 2012. Since 2017, Shears has pursued a solo career; he released his debut solo studio album, Jake Shears, in August 2018 and his second album Last Man Dancing on June 2, 2023. In addition to his solo career, Shears has collaborated with several artists and made his Broadway debut in Kinky Boots in 2018.

== Early life ==
Shears was born in Mesa, Arizona. He grew up on San Juan Island, Washington, where he attended school at Friday Harbor High School and was bullied. His "first real concert was Siouxsie and the Banshees". At the age of 18, he moved into a dorm at the Northwest School in Seattle, Washington, to finish high school. Shears later attended Occidental College in Los Angeles, California. At the age of 19, he travelled to Lexington, Kentucky, to visit a classmate, where he met Scott Hoffman. Shears and Hoffman liked each other immediately and moved to New York a year later.

== Career ==
=== Early work ===
Shears attended New York's Eugene Lang College of Liberal Arts, where he studied fiction writing and was a classmate of Travis Jeppesen. He also wrote pieces for the gay magazine HX. In 2000, he worked as a music reviewer for Paper magazine.

=== Scissor Sisters ===
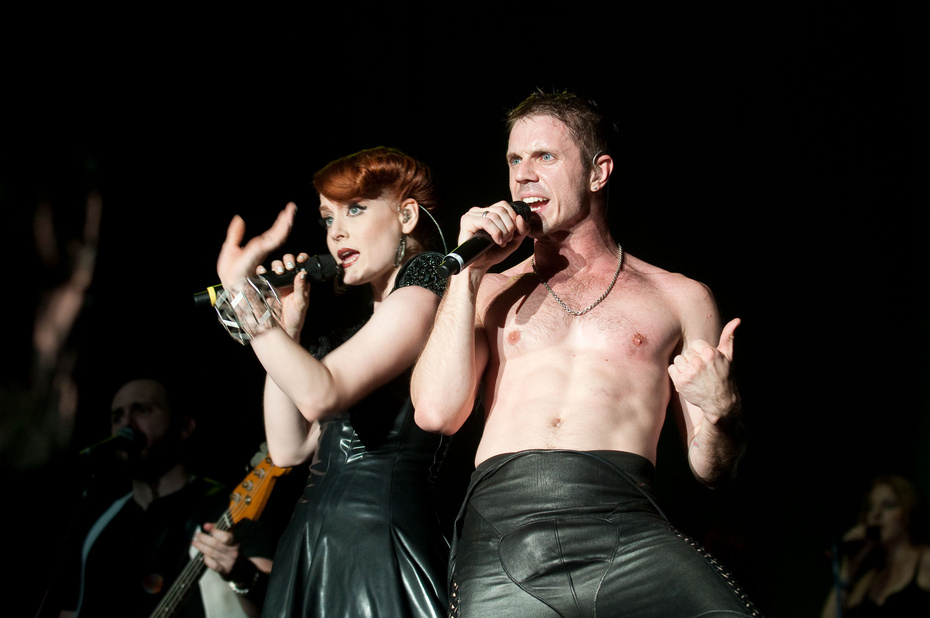
Shears performing with Scissor Sisters in Japan, 2010

Shears and Hoffman formed Scissor Sisters in 2001 as a performance art stunt, playing outrageous shows in clubs like Luxx, the heart of the electroclash scene in Williamsburg, Brooklyn, where Shears lived. After a couple of years struggling in New York (working with the record label A Touch of Class, who produced "Comfortably Numb" and "Filthy/Gorgeous"), Scissor Sisters finally found success in the United Kingdom and Ireland, ending 2004 with the biggest-selling album of the year in the UK. In concert, Shears is known for provocative dancing, flamboyant outfits, and near nudity. (During his early years while he was struggling to make it in New York, he would often earn extra money as a go-go dancer and male erotic dancer at male strip clubs.)

Shears' musical influences include The Bee Gees, Leo Sayer, ABBA, Blondie, David Bowie, Duran Duran, Roxy Music, The New York Dolls, Queen, Cher, Cyndi Lauper, Madonna, Paul McCartney, Pet Shop Boys, The Beatles, and Dolly Parton. The Scissor Sisters video for Filthy/Gorgeous was directed by John Cameron Mitchell after Shears met him at a gathering of the Radical Faeries. Shears attended Elton John's "stag" party before John's civil partnership ceremony with David Furnish in 2005. John and Shears discussed each other in The Observer in 2006.

=== Other work ===
Shears performed with Erasure's Andy Bell on "Thought It Was You", on Bell's 2005 album Electric Blue. He has also collaborated with Tiga on "Hot in Herre", "You Gonna Want Me", and "What You Need" from Tiga's album Ciao!. He also worked on Finnish house musician Luomo's "If I Can't". Together with Babydaddy, he co-wrote with Kylie Minogue on her hit single "I Believe in You" for her greatest hits compilation Ultimate Kylie. Shears and Minogue also co-wrote "Too Much" with Calvin Harris for Minogue's number one album Aphrodite. In 2011, Shears collaborated with John Garden to write the music for a musical version of the book Tales of the City. The show is directed by Jason Moore. Shears was featured on the track "Metemya" of Amadou and Mariam's 2012 album Folila. Shears also wrote the foreword to the award-winning '80s 7-inch vinyl cover art book Put the Needle on the Record. In 2013, he appeared on the Queens of the Stone Age album ...Like Clockwork, providing backing vocals on the song "Keep Your Eyes Peeled". He duetted with Cher on the track "Take it Like a Man" for her 2013 album Closer to the Truth.

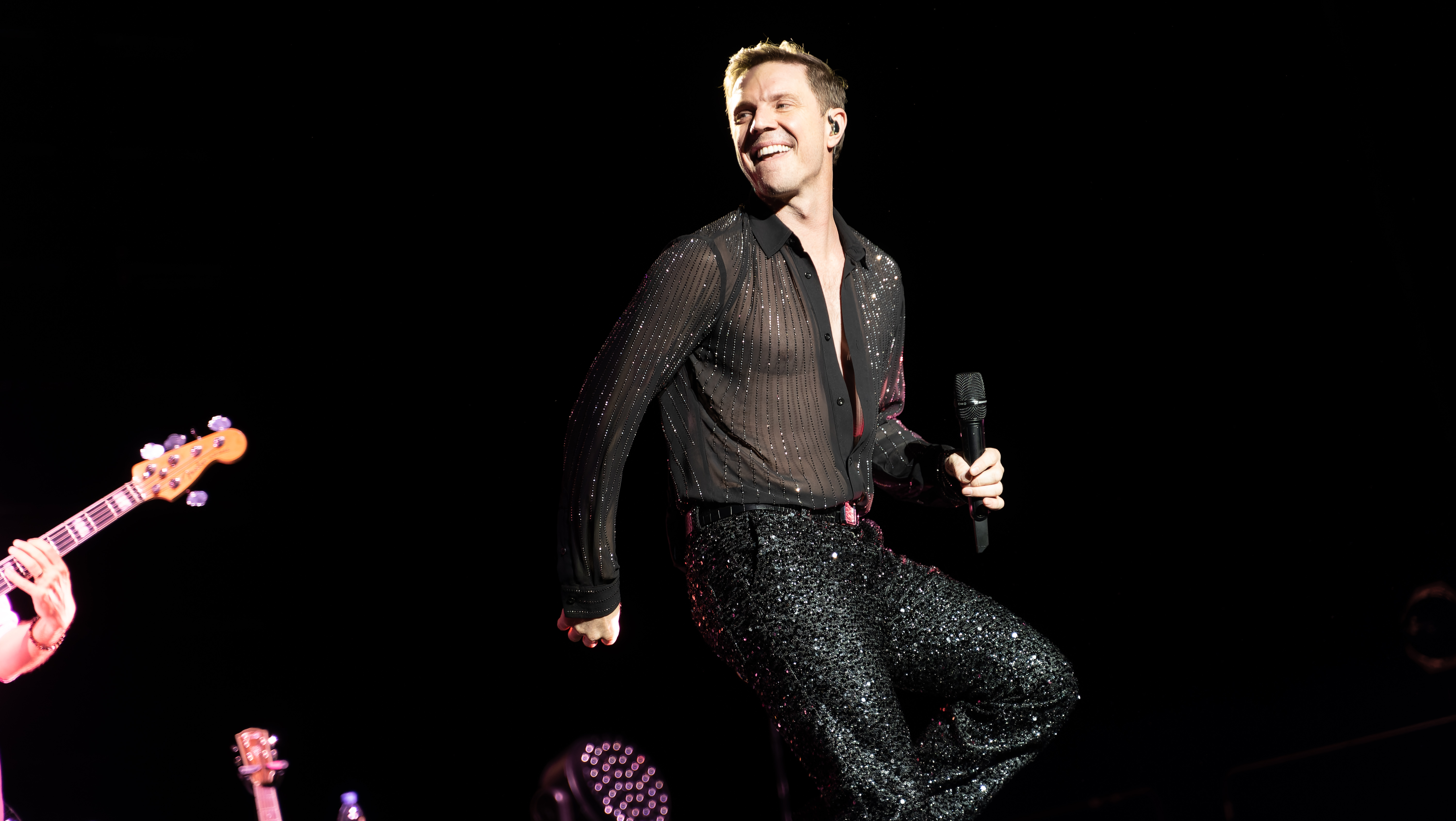
Shears performing at The O2 in 2023

In October 2017, Shears released his first song as a solo artist, "Creep City".

In January 2018, Shears made his Broadway debut starring as Charlie in Kinky Boots. He reprised the role at the Hollywood Bowl in July 2022. In February 2018, Shears published his autobiography, Boys Keep Swinging. Shears released his debut solo studio album, Jake Shears, on August 10, 2018, and received positive reviews. It peaked at N° 20 in the UK Charts.

In March 2019, Shears toured with Kylie Minogue as part of her Golden Tour.

In October 2019, Shears appeared as a collaborator on The Desert Sessions Vols. 11 & 12, most prominently as lead singer on Something You Can't See and backing vocals for Crucifire.

In January 2020, he appeared as the "Unicorn" on ITV's The Masked Singer, finishing in 6th place. Shears released the single "Meltdown" in February 2020.

On February 1, 2023, Shears released the single "Too Much Music". On June 2, 2023, Shears released his second studio album, Last Man Dancing, which contains collaborations with Kylie Minogue, Amber Martin and cameos from Jane Fonda and Iggy Pop. NME rated the album 4/5 stars.

In September 2023, he starred as the Emcee in his West End debut in the revival of Cabaret. His final performance was on March 9, 2024.

In March 2025, it was announced that Shears is featured on In the Garden, a concept album and musical by the artist Boyfriend set for release on May 9, 2025. The album reimagines the story of Adam and Eve but through Eve's lens. The project features Boyfriend as Eve alongside Billy Porter (narrator), Shears (Adam), Big Freedia (God), and Peaches (Serpent).

In 2025 he made his screen acting debut in Pillion, directed by Harry Lighton. Shears plays a gay biker, Kevin. Casting director Kahleen Crawford invited Shears for the film after she saw him in the musical Cabaret. Shears—who was not familiar with the gay biker and BDSM world that is portrayed in the film—read The Leatherman's Handbook to prepare for his role.

In September 2026, he is slated to debut as Frank-N-Furter in the Broadway revival of The Rocky Horror Show, taking over the role from Luke Evans.

== Personal life ==
Shears came out as gay to his parents at the age of 15 at the urging of Dan Savage, who later called his advice "the worst I've ever given" due to the abusive reaction of Shears' parents. In 2010, Shears participated in Savage's It Gets Better Project.

In 2012, Shears was interviewed about his experience. He spoke about his friend Anderson Cooper and said he felt gay celebrities "at least have the responsibility to come out".

Shears was in a relationship with Chris Moukarbel from 2004 to 2015.

== Awards and nominations ==
Awards and nominations for Jake Shears
Year	Awards	Work	Category	Result	Ref.
2007	Virgin Media Music Awards	Himself	Most Fanciable Male	Nominated	
2018	Best Art Vinyl	Jake Shears	Best Art Vinyl	Nominated	
2019	Classic Pop Readers' Awards	Boys Keep Swinging	Book of the Year	Nominated	
2022	Berlin Music Video Awards	"All I Want"	Best Director	Nominated	

== Discography ==
=== Albums ===
List of albums, with selected details and chart positions
Title	Details	Peak chart positions	
Title	Details	UK	UK Ind.
Jake Shears	Released: August 10, 2018; Label: Freida Jean; Formats: CD, digital download, streaming	20	4
Last Man Dancing	Released: June 2, 2023; Label: Mute; Formats: CD, digital download, streaming	18	4

=== Extended plays ===
List of extended plays, with selected details
Title	Details
B-Sides	Released: October 18, 2019; Label: Freida Jean Records; Formats: digital download, streaming

=== Singles ===
List of singles, showing year released and album name
Title	Year	Album
"Creep City"	2018	Jake Shears
"Sad Song Backwards"	2018	Jake Shears
"Big Bushy Mustache"	2018	Jake Shears
"Meltdown"	2020	Non-album single
"Do the Television"	2021	Last Man Dancing
"Amazing" (Apple Music only)	2022	Non-album single
"Too Much Music"	2023	Last Man Dancing
"Devil Came Down the Dance Floor" (with Amber Martin)	2023	Last Man Dancing
"I Used to Be In Love"	2023	Last Man Dancing
"Last Man Dancing"	2023	Last Man Dancing

==== As featured artist ====
List of singles as a featured artist, showing year released and album name
Title	Year	Album
"Disappearer" (AVEC featuring Jake Shears)	2013	Non-album single
"The Other Boys" (NERVO featuring Kylie Minogue, Jake Shears & Nile Rogers)	2015	Collateral
"Sensation" (Bright Light Bright Light featuring Jake Shears)	2020	Fun City
"All I Want" (Boys Noize featuring Jake Shears)	2021	Non-album single
"Neon Lights" (Annie featuring Jake Shears)	2021	Neon Lights
"Free Your Mind" (Arielle Free featuring Jake Shears)	2023	Non-album single
"Fire & Ice" (Purple Disco Machine featuring Jake Shears)	2025	Non-album single

=== Guest appearances ===
List of non-single guest appearances, with other performing artists, showing year released and album name
Title	Year	Other artist(s)	Album
"Tools Down"	2018	The Presets	Hi Viz
"Dirty Pleasures"	2024	Purple Disco Machine, Lorenz Rhode	Paradise

== Tours ==
Supporting act

- Kylie Minogue – Golden Tour (2019)
- Duran Duran – Future Present Tour (2023)
- Jamiroquai – Lytham Festival (June 2023)

== See also ==
- LGBT culture in New York City
- List of LGBT people from New York City
