= Revolution (R3hab and Nervo and Ummet Ozcan song) =

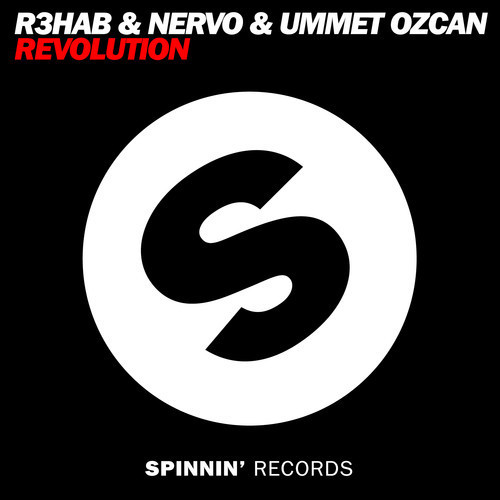

Single by R3hab, Nervo and Ummet Ozcan
- Released: 20 January 2014
- Recorded: 2013
- Genre: Big room house, Electro house
- Length: 5:03 (vocal mix); 3:23 (radio mix); 4:03 (instrumental mix)
- Label: Spinnin'
- Songwriters: Fadil El Ghoul; Miriam Nervo; Olivia Nervo; Ummet Ozcan
- Producers: R3hab; Nervo; Ummet Ozcan

R3hab singles chronology
"Chasing Summers" (2013)	"Revolution" (2014)	"Flashlight" (2014)

Nervo singles chronology
"Hold On" (2013)	"Revolution" (2014)	"Ready For the Weekend" (2014)

Ummet Ozcan singles chronology
"The Code" (2013)	"Revolution" (2014)	"Raise Your Hands" (2014)

Music video
- "Revolution" on YouTube

"Revolution" is a song by Dutch DJ and record producer R3hab, Australian twin sisters Nervo and Dutch dance musician Ummet Ozcan. It was released through Spinnin' Records. It peaked at number 37 on the UK Singles Chart.

== Music video ==
A music video to accompany the release of "Revolution" was published to YouTube on 17 December 2013. It was directed by Jaakko Manninen and Hannu Aukia, and produced by Sophie McNeil. As of June 2021, it has over 44 million views.

== Track listing ==
Digital download – single #1
No.	Title	Length
1.	"Revolution" (instrumental mix)	4:03

Digital download – single #2
No.	Title	Length
1.	"Revolution" (vocal mix)	5:03

Digital download – single #3
No.	Title	Length
1.	"Revolution" (radio mix)	3:23

Digital download – single #4
No.	Title	Length
1.	"Revolution" (original mix)	6:49

Digital download (The Remixes)
No.	Title	Length
1.	"Revolution" (Audien Remix)	4:26
2.	"Revolution" (Chocolate Puma Remix)	6:09
3.	"Revolution" (Acapella)	3:09

UK/Australian Remixes
No.	Title	Length
1.	"Revolution" (Audien Remix)	4:26
2.	"Revolution" (Chocolate Puma Remix)	6:09
3.	"Revolution" (Shockone Remix)	4:12
4.	"Revolution" (Show n Prove Remix)	3:14
5.	"Revolution" (Sunship Remix)	5:57

Digital download – remix single
No.	Title	Length
1.	"Revolution" (Mavay Remix)	4:18

== Chart performance ==
Chart performance for "Revolution"
Chart (2013–2014)	Peak position
Belgium Dance (Ultratop Flanders)	30
Belgium (Ultratip Bubbling Under Flanders)	26
France (SNEP)	163
Ireland (IRMA)	67
Poland (Video Chart)	5
Scotland Singles (Official Charts)	25
UK Singles (Official Charts)	37
UK Dance (Official Charts)	12
US Dance Airplay (Billboard)	3

== Release history ==
Release history and formats for "Revolution"
Country	Date	Format	Release	Cat. No.	Label
Netherlands United States Canada	11 November 2013	Beatport-exclusive	Instrumental Mix	SP746	Spinnin'
Netherlands United States Canada	25 November 2013	Digital download	Instrumental Mix	SP746	Spinnin'
Netherlands United States Canada	6 January 2014	Beatport-exclusive	Vocal Mix	SP799	Spinnin'
Netherlands United States Canada	20 January 2014	Digital download	Vocal Mix	SP799	Spinnin'
United Kingdom	20 April 2014	Digital download	Remixes - EP	3BEAT172	3 Beat
Netherlands United States Canada	26 May 2014	Beatport-exclusive	The Remixes	SPRS025	SPRS
Netherlands United States Canada	9 June 2014	Digital download	The Remixes	SPRS025	SPRS
Australia	9 June 2014	Digital download	Remixes – EP	OMG468E	Onelove
