= The Other Boys =

2015 single by Nervo featuring Kylie Minogue, Jake Shears and Nile Rogers

Single by Nervo featuring Kylie Minogue, Jake Shears and Nile Rodgers

from the album Collateral
- Released: 23 October 2015
- Recorded: 2015
- Genre: Pop; disco
- Length: 2:59 (radio edit)
- Label: Ultra
- Songwriters: Miriam Nervo; Olivia Nervo; Nile Rodgers; Fred Falke
- Producers: Nervo; Nile Rodgers; Fred Falke

Nervo singles chronology
"Hey Ricky" (2015)	"The Other Boys" (2015)	"Bulletproof" (2016)

Kylie Minogue singles chronology
"Right Here, Right Now" (2015)	"The Other Boys" (2015)	"Only You" (2015)

Jake Shears singles chronology
"The Other Boys" (2015)	"Creep City" (2018)

Nile Rodgers singles chronology
"Magic" (2015)	"The Other Boys" (2015)	"Overcome" (2016)

Music video
- "The Other Boys" on YouTube

"The Other Boys" is a song performed by Australian twin sisters Nervo featuring Kylie Minogue, Jake Shears and Nile Rodgers. It is included on Nervo's debut studio album, Collateral. The single was released on 23 October 2015.

Miriam Nervo said of the collaboration, "These guys [Kylie Minogue and Jake Shears] are such strong artists that they put their creative stamp on everything so I think it was a real creative thing, very natural, that just worked really well." adding "I love Nile's guitar bit! It's amazing, it just brought it to a whole new level, it was the icing on the cake."

== Critical reception ==
Mike Wass of Idolator said "Nervo's production looks to the past for inspiration, but is definitely rooted in the here and now, while Kylie and Jake trade vocal blows on the soaring, gender-blind chorus." He later added, "The Other Boys" is an "irresistible, disco-tinged floor-filler".

Justin Harp from Digital Spy said "The floor-filler combines electro-pop with disco beats in a way that seems tailor-made for Minogue and Shears to duet."

== Music video ==
The music video was filmed in August 2015 in London's Brick Lane. Minogue posted photos of the video shoot on her instagram account on 27 August. In it she is wearing a vintage Comme des Garçons dress and Casadei boots. On 16 October, Nervo said on their Facebook page that they "Can't wait to show you guys the video".

The music video premiered on 28 October 2015 via Ultra Music's YouTube page.

== Track listing ==
Remixes
No.	Title	Length
1.	"The Other Boys" (radio edit)	2:59
2.	"The Other Boys" (Bojan Handbag Anthem Remix)	4:30
3.	"The Other Boys" (Florian Picasso Remix)	4:30
4.	"The Other Boys" (Teenage Mutants Remix)	5:28
5.	"The Other Boys" (Viglietti Remix)	4:24

12" UK Remixes
No.	Title	Length
1.	"The Other Boys" (original exclusive UK edit)	3:07
2.	"The Other Boys" (Rhythm Masters Remix)	6:03
3.	"The Other Boys" (Mr Gonzo Alternate Mix)	4:27
4.	"The Other Boys" (Michael Mandal & Forbes Remix)	5:45

== Charts ==
Chart performance for "The Other Boys"
Chart (2015)	Peak position
Argentina (Los 40 Principales)	5
US Dance Club Songs (Billboard)	1

== Release history ==
Release history and formats for "The Other Boys"
Region	Date	Format	Label	Ref.
Various	23 October 2015	Digital download (Remix EP)	Ultra Music	

== See also ==
- List of number-one dance singles of 2015 (U.S.)
