= Jake Shears (album) =

Studio album by Jake Shears
- Released: August 10, 2018
- Length: 45:08
- Label: Freida Jean (Absolute UK)
- Producer: Jake Shears; Kevin Ratterman

Jake Shears chronology
Jake Shears (2018)	Last Man Dancing (2023)

Singles from Jake Shears
- 1. "Creep City" Released: May 25, 2018; 2. "Big Bushy Mustache" Released: August 3, 2018; 3. "Sad Song Backwards" Released: September 28, 2018

Jake Shears is the self-titled debut solo album by Jake Shears, released on August 10, 2018. "Creep City" serves as the album's lead single.

== Recording and composition ==
The album was recorded in Louisville with Kevin Ratterman, as well as members of My Morning Jacket.

== Promotion ==
"Creep City" serves as the album's lead single. The music video was directed by Mac Boucher.

The second single was "Sad Song Backwards". It was accompanied by a lyric video.

"Big Bushy Moustache" was released as the third single. Its video was directed by Mac Boucher too, and consists on Shears strutting in New Orleans, urging other men to join him in the celebration of facial hair. It features a cameo by Queens of the Stone Age's Josh Homme (who had previously collaborated with Scissor Sisters on the promotion of 2010 Magic Hour).

"Everything I Ever Need" was released as the fourth single, with a video (also directed by Boucher) inspired by Elton John and Freddie Mercury.

Shears toured the album in the United States and will support Kylie Minogue touring Australia in 2019.

== Critical reception ==
Professional ratings
Aggregate scores
Source	Rating
Metacritic	78/100
Review scores
Source	Rating
Albumism	4/5 stars
AllMusic	3.5/5 stars
The Guardian	3/5 stars
MusicOMH	4/5 stars
NME	4/5 stars

Jake Shears received generally positive reviews from music critics. At Metacritic, which assigns a normalized rating out of 100 to reviews from mainstream critics, the album has an average score of 78 based on 12 reviews, indicating "generally favorable reviews".

== Track listing ==
Jake Shears track listing
No.	Title	Length
1.	"Introduction"	0:25
2.	"Good Friends"	3:30
3.	"Big Bushy Mustache"	3:35
4.	"Sad Song Backwards"	4:17
5.	"Everything I'll Ever Need"	4:05
6.	"All for What"	4:35
7.	"S.O.B."	3:51
8.	"Creep City"	3:25
9.	"The Bruiser"	5:38
10.	"Clothes Off"	3:50
11.	"Palace in the Sky"	4:08
12.	"Mississippi Delta (I'm Your Man)"	3:49

=== B-Sides EP ===
The B-Sides EP was released in 2019, a year after the album.

B-Sides EP track listing
No.	Title	Length
1.	"Whatever It Takes"	3:52
2.	"Fit Ain't One Thing"	3:37
3.	"Arrington Fields"	5:42

== Charts ==
Chart performance for Jake Shears
Chart (2018)	Peak position
Scottish Albums (OCC)	17
UK Albums (OCC)	20
UK Independent Albums (OCC)	4
