= You're Gonna Love Again =

Single by Nervo

from the album Collateral
- Released: 4 June 2012
- Recorded: 2011
- Genre: Progressive house
- Length: 3:21 (radio edit); 5:47 (extended mix)
- Label: Astralwerks
- Songwriters: Miriam Nervo; Olivia Nervo; Tim Bergling
- Producers: Nervo; Avicii

Nervo singles chronology
"Livin' My Love" (2012)	"You're Gonna Love Again" (2012)	"Like Home" (2012)

"You're Gonna Love Again" is a song by Australian twin sisters Nervo featuring uncredited songwriting and production from Swedish DJ Avicii. The single was released digitally on 4 June 2012 in Australia and the United States and is included on their 2015 album, Collateral.

"You're Gonna Love Again" was leaked in 2011 and reached number one on the Hype Machine chart.

== Music video ==
A music video to accompany the release of "You're Gonna Love Again" was released on YouTube on 2 July 2012. It features Australian actress Cleopatra Coleman.

== Track listing ==
Digital download
No.	Title	Length
1.	"You're Gonna Love Again" (radio edit)	3:21
Total length:		3:21

Remix EP digital download
No.	Title	Length
1.	"You're Gonna Love Again" (extended mix)	5:47
2.	"You're Gonna Love Again" (Marco V Vocal Remix)	7:11
3.	"You're Gonna Love Again" (Pixel Cheese Remix)	5:49
4.	"You're Gonna Love Again" (Alex Kenji Remix)	5:32
5.	"You're Gonna Love Again" (Robin Rocks & Rubio Remix)	5:46
6.	"You're Gonna Love Again" (Pleasurecraft 'Happily Never After' Remix)	5:56
7.	"You're Gonna Love Again" (MYNC Stadium Remix)	6:09

== Chart performance ==
Chart performance for "You're Gonna Love Again"
Chart (2012)	Peak position
Belgium Dance (Ultratop Flanders)	29
Belgium (Ultratip Bubbling Under Flanders)	55
France (SNEP)	129
US Dance Club Songs (Billboard)	4

== Release history ==
Release history and formats for "You're Gonna Love Again"
Country	Date	Format	Label
Australia	4 June 2012	Digital download	Astralwerks
United States	4 June 2012	Digital download	Astralwerks
United Kingdom	19 August 2012	Digital download	Astralwerks
