= I Could Be the One =

2012 single by Avicii and Nicky Romero

Single by Avicii and Nicky Romero
- Released: 26 December 2012
- Genre: Progressive house; electro house
- Length: 3:28 (radio edit); 7:35 (original mix)
- Label: LE7ELS; Universal Music
- Songwriters: Nick Rotteveel; Arash Pournouri; Tim Bergling; Linus Wiklund; Jonnali Parmenius; Måns Wredenberg
- Producers: Avicii; Nicky Romero; Arash Pournouri

Avicii singles chronology
| "Dancing in My Head" (2012) | "I Could Be the One" (2012) | "X You" (2013) |

Nicky Romero singles chronology
| "Like Home" (2012) | "I Could Be the One" (2012) | "Legacy" (2013) |

Music video
- "I Could Be the One" on YouTube

"I Could Be the One" is a song by Swedish DJ Avicii and Dutch DJ Nicky Romero, which features uncredited vocals from Swedish singer Noonie Bao. The song was written by Avicii, Romero, Bao, Arash Pournouri, Linus Wiklund and Måns Wredenberg, and produced by the former two and Pournouri. The song was released as a digital download in Sweden and the Netherlands on 26 December 2012. It peaked at number three on the Swedish Singles Chart. Internationally, the single topped the charts in Hungary and the United Kingdom, peaked within the top 10 in Australia, Belgium, the Czech Republic, Denmark, Finland, the Netherlands, Norway and the Republic of Ireland and the top 20 of the charts in Austria and New Zealand.

== Background and release ==
Before its official release, the track had been undergoing various name changes. Initially without a title, it was first played by Avicii at the Super Glow event in DC Armory, Washington, USA on 18 November 2011. It was later given the working title "Nicktim", which is a combination of both producers' first names (Nick Rotteveel and Tim Bergling). The instrumental track contained a sample from "D.A.N.C.E." by Justice, which was later removed in the final version.

A year later, a vocal version of the track was premiered on 4 November 2012 through Avicii's "LE7ELS" podcast, as well as on Nicky Romero's podcast "Protocol Radio" a week later. After fully mastering the track, they settled on using the track name "I Could Be the One (Nicktim)" while the artists are stated as Avicii vs Nicky Romero.

In 2017, the track's vocalist and songwriter Noonie Bao revealed to Spotify that despite working on the track, as well as another one on his 2013 album True, she had never actually met Avicii until a number of years later.

== Critical reception ==
Robert Copsey of Digital Spy gave the song a mixed-to-positive review, stating:

The person in question is Dutch house producer Nicky Romero, a man who is slightly better acquainted with the current crop of mainstream club poppers, including Calvin Harris, David Guetta and Bingo Players. As such, "I Could Be the One" is a battle between Balearic-style EDM and squiggly, chart-friendly breakdowns that hit all the right places. The result, predictably, is a peaceful truce..

== Commercial performance ==
"I Could Be the One" peaked at number three on the Swedish Singles Chart. The single also saw massive success worldwide, particularly in the United Kingdom, where the single entered at number one on the UK Singles Chart on 17 February 2013 ― for the week ending 23 February 2013 ― becoming both Avicii and Nicky Romero's first chart-topping single in Britain. On the UK Dance Chart, "I Could Be the One" debuted at number one ahead of Baauer's "Harlem Shake", which entered the chart at number three.

== Music video ==
A music video to accompany the release of "I Could Be the One" was first released onto YouTube on 24 December 2012 at a total length of 4 minutes and 46 seconds. It was directed by Peter Huang and won first prize for non-European music video at the Young Director Award 2013 in Cannes.

The video stars Inessa Frantowski as a woman who works in an office. Gig Morton also appears as one of her coworkers. The woman is dissatisfied with her job, morning routine, and colleagues' attitudes. In one scene, she is seen waking up in a room next to a used condom and a man in bed with her; when she opens the doors in her room, it reveals a balcony overlooking a beach. She finds a "To-Do List" in the room, with the only 'job' being to "not give a fuck".

Subsequently, there are several shots of her appearing to enjoy this freedom: she walks down a beach and destroys a little girl's sandcastle, eats a selection of foods in a restaurant before kissing a waiter, and dances with a man at a nightclub before the two have sex aboard a yacht. However, she then wakes up in her own apartment, revealing the prior events to be a dream. She sees a therapist and is prescribed additional medication.

In a late sequence, the woman dances around a meadow in "hippie"-styled clothing, after attempting to follow an online ad to "free herself." She subsequently smokes a large cannabis cigarette, in the same clothing, and envisions riding a horse with a man while inside of another strip club. The video then returns to her office, where she sits at her desk listening to her colleagues' conversations; becoming increasingly agitated, she begins to destroy the office. After throwing paperwork, destroying a fax machine, and assaulting some of her colleagues, she flees the office.

The woman is shown, again, partying at a strip club. Bursting out the office door, the final scene shows her booking a one-way ticket to Barbados on her phone. As she runs across the road to her car, she is hit by a delivery van labelled "2Late." It is unknown whether she survives.

In France, the video music was broadcast during the day then was ban before 10 p.m following obscene images, use of drugs and alcohol, sexual scenes, nudity and incitement to debauchery on it. The video was broadcast with a warning Not advised to kids under 10 years old or 12 years old (in French : déconseillé aux moins de 10 ou 12 ans) or without warning. French music channel Trace Urban broadcast it after 11 p.m. with a warning Not advised to kids under 16 years old (in French : déconseillé aux moins de 16 ans).

== Track listings ==
Digital download
| No. | Title | Length |
|---|---|---|
| 1. | "I Could Be the One" (Nicktim) (Radio Edit) | 3:28 |
| 2. | "I Could Be the One" (Nicktim) (Instrumental Mix) | 7:35 |
| 3. | "I Could Be the One" (Nicktim) (Original Mix) | 7:35 |
| 4. | "I Could Be the One" (Nicktim) (Audrio Remix) | 7:16 |
| 5. | "I Could Be the One" (Nicktim) (Didrick Remix) | 5:40 |

Digital download - Remixes
| No. | Title | Length |
|---|---|---|
| 1. | "I Could Be the One" (John Christian Remix) | 5:28 |
| 2. | "I Could Be the One" (Dank Remix) | 5:02 |
| 3. | "I Could Be the One" (Bent Collective Remix) | 7:32 |
| 4. | "I Could Be the One" (DubVision Remix) | 6:48 |

Digital download - Noonie Bao Acoustic Mix
| No. | Title | Length |
|---|---|---|
| 1. | "I Could Be the One" (Noonie Bao Acoustic Mix) | 3:51 |
| 2. | "I Could Be the One" (Noonie Bao Acoustic Instrumental Mix) | 3:57 |

== Credits and personnel ==
- Producers – Avicii, Nicky Romero, Ash Pournouri
- Lyrics – Linus Wiklund, Noonie Bao, Måns Wredenberg
- Vocals – Noonie Bao
- Label – Universal Music Group

== Charts ==
=== Weekly charts ===
| Chart (2013) | Peak; position |
|---|---|
| Australia (ARIA) | 4 |
| Austria (Ö3 Austria Top 40) | 15 |
| Belgium (Ultratop 50 Flanders) | 8 |
| Belgium (Ultratop 50 Wallonia) | 9 |
| Canada Hot 100 (Billboard) | 65 |
| Czech Republic Airplay (ČNS IFPI) | 6 |
| Denmark (Tracklisten) | 9 |
| Euro Digital Song Sales (Billboard) | 3 |
| Finland (Suomen virallinen lista) | 2 |
| France (SNEP) | 22 |
| Germany (GfK) | 37 |
| Hungary (Dance Top 40) | 3 |
| Hungary (Rádiós Top 40) | 1 |
| Iceland (Tonlist) | 26 |
| Ireland (IRMA) | 3 |
| Netherlands (Dutch Top 40) | 7 |
| Netherlands (Single Top 100) | 15 |
| New Zealand (Recorded Music NZ) | 12 |
| Norway (VG-lista) | 4 |
| Poland Dance (ZPAV) | 2 |
| Russia Airplay (TopHit) | 2 |
| Scottish Singles Sales (Official Charts) | 1 |
| Slovakia Airplay (ČNS IFPI) | 6 |
| Spain (Promusicae) | 36 |
| Sweden (Sverigetopplistan) | 3 |
| Switzerland (Schweizer Hitparade) | 26 |
| UK Singles (Official Charts) | 1 |
| UK Dance (Official Charts) | 1 |
| Ukraine Airplay (TopHit) | 41 |
| US Bubbling Under Hot 100 (Billboard) | 1 |
| US Hot Dance/Electronic Songs (Billboard) | 10 |
| US Dance Club Songs (Billboard) | 1 |
| US Pop Airplay (Billboard) | 34 |

=== Year-end charts ===
| Chart (2013) | Position |
|---|---|
| Australia (ARIA) | 36 |
| Austria (Ö3 Austria Top 40) | 61 |
| Belgium (Ultratop 50 Flanders) | 35 |
| Belgium Dance (Ultratop Flanders) | 5 |
| Belgium (Ultratop 50 Wallonia) | 37 |
| Belgium Dance (Ultratop Wallonia) | 7 |
| France (SNEP) | 82 |
| Hungary (Dance Top 40) | 9 |
| Hungary (Rádiós Top 40) | 41 |
| Netherlands (Dutch Top 40) | 37 |
| Netherlands (Single Top 100) | 74 |
| Russia Airplay (TopHit) | 19 |
| Sweden (Sverigetopplistan) | 7 |
| Ukraine Airplay (TopHit) | 139 |
| UK Singles (Official Charts Company) | 27 |
| US Dance Club Songs (Billboard) | 14 |
| US Hot Dance/Electronic Songs (Billboard) | 27 |

| Chart (2014) | Position |
|---|---|
| Hungary (Dance Top 40) | 90 |

== Certifications ==
| Region | Certification | Certified units/sales |
|---|---|---|
| Australia (ARIA) | 4× Platinum | 280,000^{‡} |
| Belgium (BRMA) | Gold | 15,000^{*} |
| Brazil (Pro-Música Brasil) | 2× Platinum | 120,000^{‡} |
| Germany (BVMI) | Gold | 150,000^{‡} |
| Italy (FIMI) | Platinum | 30,000^{‡} |
| Mexico (AMPROFON) | 3× Platinum | 180,000^{‡} |
| Netherlands (NVPI) | 3× Platinum | 60,000^{^} |
| New Zealand (RMNZ) | Platinum | 15,000^{*} |
| Spain (Promusicae) | Platinum | 60,000^{‡} |
| United Kingdom (BPI) | 2× Platinum | 1,200,000^{‡} |
| United States (RIAA) | Platinum | 1,000,000^{‡} |
Streaming
| Denmark (IFPI Danmark) | 2× Platinum | 3,600,000^{†} |
^{*} Sales figures based on certification alone.^{^} Shipments figures based on certification alone.^{‡} Sales+streaming figures based on certification alone.^{†} Streaming-only figures based on certification alone.

== Release history ==
| Region | Date | Format | Label |
|---|---|---|---|
| Italy | 14 December 2012 | Contemporary hit radio | Universal Music |
| Sweden | 26 December 2012 | Digital download | Avicii Music |
| Netherlands | 26 December 2012 | Digital download | Avicii Music |
| United Kingdom | 10 February 2013 | Digital download | Universal Music |
| United States | 12 March 2013 | Contemporary hit radio | LE7ELS; Casablanca; Republic |
| Sweden | 15 March 2013 | Digital download (remixes) | Avicii Music |
| Netherlands | 15 March 2013 | Digital download (remixes) | Avicii Music |
| United Kingdom | 17 March 2013 | Digital download (remixes) | Universal Music |
| United States | 15 April 2013 | Digital download | Avicii Music |

== See also ==
- List of number-one dance singles of 2013 (U.S.)
