= Toulouse (song) =

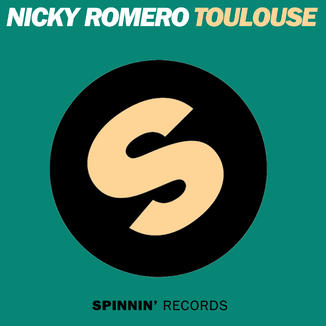

Single by Nicky Romero
- Released: 19 December 2011
- Recorded: 2011
- Genre: Dutch house; big room house
- Length: 6:05 (single version); 4:20 (video edit)
- Label: Spinnin'
- Songwriter: Nicky Romero
- Producer: Nicky Romero

Nicky Romero singles chronology
"Toulouse" (2011)	"Wild One Two" (2012)

Music video
- "Toulouse" on YouTube

"Toulouse" is a song by Dutch DJ and music producer Nicky Romero. It was released as a single on 19 December 2011 in the Netherlands and 2 January 2012 in the United States through Spinnin' Records. A music video for the song was uploaded to YouTube on 9 May 2012.

In mid 2012, a version with vocals from Bobby Anthony was released.

On 20 August 2020 an edit was released for the song with its music video following a few weeks later.

== Music video ==
The music video for the song, lasting four minutes and twenty seconds, was unofficially uploaded on 9 May 2012 to YouTube. It was directed by Timo Pierre Rositzki and has garnered over 459 million views as of June 2022. On 8 May 2017 the official video was taken down due to a copyright claim by Spinnin' Records, the label for the song. However, from June that year, the copyright claim was retracted. Throughout the video, several people can be seen wearing Guy Fawkes masks. Despite the fact that the song was named "Toulouse", the music video was filmed in Hamburg, Germany, including in the Reeperbahn district.

== Track listing ==
- Spinnin' — SP451

Single release
No.	Title	Length
1.	"Toulouse"	6:05

- Spinnin' — SP487

Toulouse (The Remixes)
No.	Title	Length
1.	"Toulouse" (Chocolate Puma Remix)	7:04
2.	"Toulouse" (Tommy Trash Remix)	5:45

- Spinnin' — TBA
  Toulouse (2020 Edit)
  No.	Title	Length
  1.	"Toulouse" (2020 Edit)	4:26

== Charts ==
Chart (2012)	Peak position
Netherlands (Single Top 100)	92
Netherlands Dance (Single Top 100)	17
Global Dance Songs (Billboard)	24

== Release history ==
Region	Date	Label	Format	Catalogue no.
Netherlands	19 December 2011	Spinnin'	Digital download	SP451
United States	2 January 2012	Spinnin'	Digital download	SP451
