= Like Home =

Single by Nicky Romero and Nervo
- Released: 12 November 2012
- Recorded: 2012
- Genre: Progressive house
- Length: 5:31
- Label: Protocol
- Songwriters: Nicky Romero; Miriam Nervo; Olivia Nervo
- Producers: Nicky Romero; Miriam Nervo; Olivia Nervo

Nicky Romero singles chronology
"Wild One Two" (2012)	"Like Home" (2012)	"I Could Be the One" (2012)

Nervo singles chronology
"You're Gonna Love Again" (2012)	"Like Home" (2012)	"Hold On" (2013)

Music video
- "Like Home" on YouTube

"Like Home" is a song by Dutch DJ and producer Nicky Romero and Australian twin sisters Nervo. It was the third single released from Romero's label, Protocol Recordings. It was also the second song from the label to top the Beatport Top 100 chart. It peaked at number 33 on the UK Singles Chart.

== Music video ==
A music video to accompany the release of "Like Home" was directed by Kyle Padilla and released on YouTube on 21 February 2013.

== Track listing ==
No.	Title	Length
1.	"Like Home" (radio edit)	3:20
2.	"Like Home" (original mix)	5:31
3.	"Like Home" (Dannic Remix)	6:09
4.	"Like Home" (Dillon Francis Remix)	3:46
5.	"Like Home" (Gregor Salto Remix)	5:33
6.	"Like Home" (Karetus Remix)	4:38

== Chart performance ==
Chart performance for "Like Home"
Chart (2012–13)	Peak position
Belgium Dance (Ultratop Flanders)	27
Belgium (Ultratip Bubbling Under Flanders)	76
Belgium Dance (Ultratop Wallonia)	33
Belgium Dance Bubbling Under (Ultratop Wallonia)	1
Belgium (Ultratip Bubbling Under Wallonia)	23
Netherlands (Single Top 100)	81
Ireland (IRMA)	53
Scottish Singles Sales (Official Charts)	16
Sweden (Sverigetopplistan)	37
UK Dance (Official Charts)	9
UK Singles (Official Charts)	33
US Dance Airplay (Billboard)	19

== Certifications ==
Certifications for "Like Home"
Region	Certification	Certified units/sales
Netherlands (NVPI)	2× Platinum	40,000^{^}
Sweden (GLF)	Gold	20,000^{‡}
^{^} Shipments figures based on certification alone.^{‡} Sales+streaming figures based on certification alone.

== Release history ==
Release history and formats for "Like Home"
Country	Date	Format	Label
Various	12 November 2012	Beatport-exclusive	Protocol Recordings
Various	17 December 2012 (Remixes)	Beatport-exclusive	Protocol Recordings
Netherlands	21 February 2013	Digital download	Protocol Recordings
Belgium	21 February 2013	Digital download	Protocol Recordings
Luxembourg	21 February 2013	Digital download	Protocol Recordings
Switzerland	8 March 2013	Digital download	Sirup Music
Austria	8 March 2013	Digital download	Sirup Music
Germany	8 March 2013	Digital download	Sirup Music
United States	25 March 2013	Digital download	Protocol Recordings
United Kingdom	23 April 2013	Digital download	Positiva/Virgin
Australia	3 May 2013	Digital download	Astrx (MoSA)
Canada	28 May 2013	Digital download	Awesome Music
