= Nicky Romero =

Dutch DJ (born 1989)

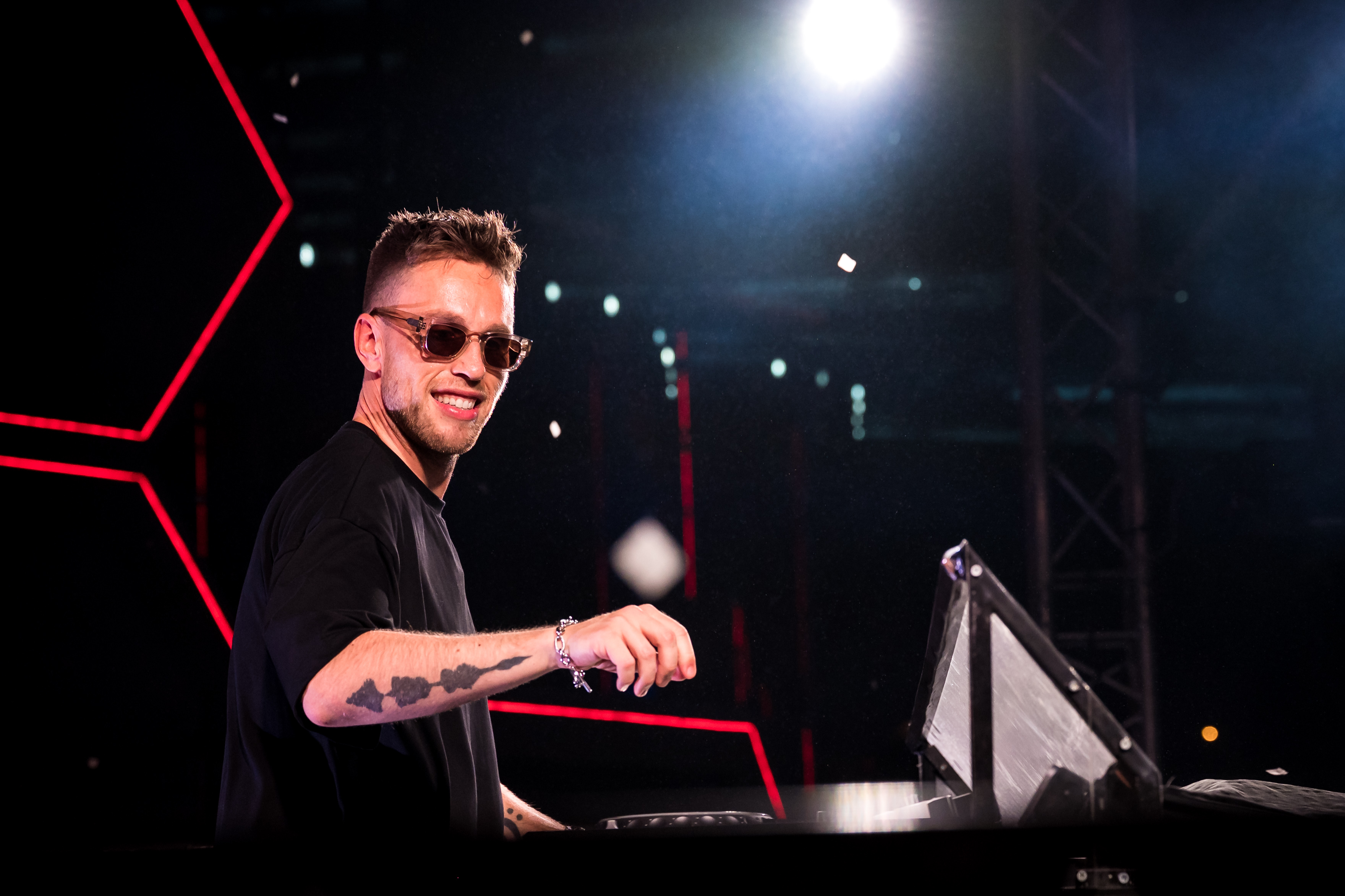
- Nicky Romero at S2O Thailand 2023

Background information
- Also known as: Monocule
- Born: Nick Rotteveel; 6 January 1989 (age 37); Amerongen, Utrecht, Netherlands
- Genres: EDM; tech house; electro house; progressive house; big room house; future bass; dance-pop; psychedelic trance
- Occupations: Musician; DJ; record producer; remixer
- Instruments: Keyboards; synthesizers
- Years active: 2007–present
- Labels: Protocol; Toolroom; Cr2; Spinnin'; Revealed
- Website: nickyromero.com

Nick Rotteveel (Dutch pronunciation: [nɪk ˈrɔtəveːl]; born 6 January 1989), professionally known as Nicky Romero or Monocule, is a Dutch DJ, record producer and remixer from Amerongen, Utrecht Province. He has worked with, and received support from DJs, such as Tiësto, Fedde le Grand, Sander van Doorn, David Guetta, Calvin Harris, Armand van Helden, Avicii and Hardwell. He currently ranks at number 20 on DJ Mag's annual Top 100 DJs poll. He is known for his viral hit song "Toulouse".

== Early life ==
Nick Rotteveel was born and raised in Amerongen, Netherlands. He moved to Kingston, Ontario, Canada for a year, and later moved back to the Netherlands to continue his education where he did his final semesters in France.

== Career ==
Romero signed to Once Records and released the tracks "Privilege" and "Qwerty". It was followed by the track "Funktion One" was released, which was mixed by Azucar (from Madskillz and Gregor Salto) and later added "Hear My Sound". In 2009 he remixed Tony Cha Cha's track "Get on the Floor" and a bootleg for David Guetta entitled "When Love Takes Over". Both tracks increased his profile and the Ministry of Sound contacted him to do some remixes on their label. He also made a remix for the Dirty South track "Alamo".

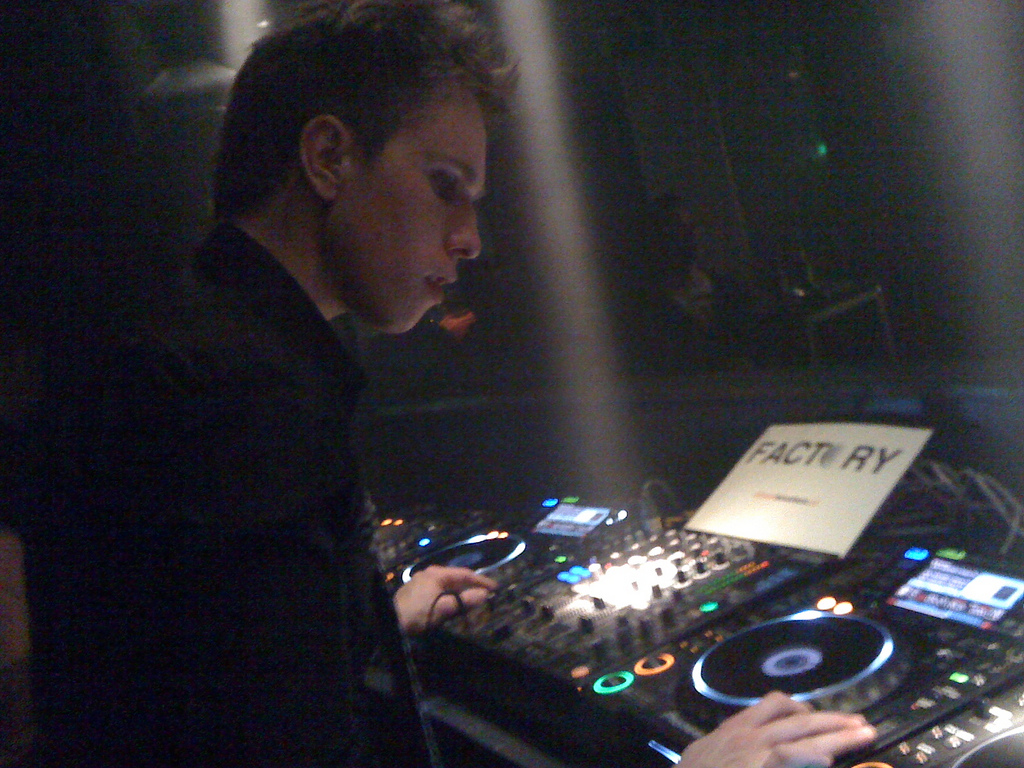
Romero in 2011

In 2010 Nicky Romero came up with a new track called "My Friend" (released on Spinnin' Records) which features a sample from the well known Groove Armada track of the same name.

"My Friend" has been played by DJs and record producers such as Tiësto, Axwell, Fedde Le Grand, Sander van Doorn and many more. The track reached Number 4 at Beatport worldwide overall chart, Number 1 at Dance-Tunes chart and several other famous DJ charts. 2011 saw Romero release plenty of remixes such as "Where Them Girls At" by David Guetta featuring Flo Rida and Nicki Minaj, "What A Feeling" by Alex Gaudino featuring Kelly Rowland, "Stronger" by Erick Morillo and Eddie Thoneick featuring Shawnee Taylor, "Where Is The Love" by Eddie Thoneick and "Rockin' High" by Ben Liebrand.

=== 2012–2013: Mainstream success ===
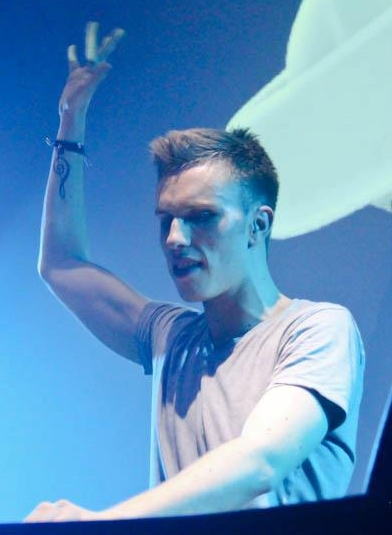
Nicky Romero in Czech Republic, 2013

In 2012, Romero achieved popularity with the recording "Toulouse", which became a mainstay on the Beatport Top Ten for a significant period of time. Recognizing his talent, MTV named him an EDM artist to watch in 2012. His popularity has risen in recent years, and he has attained a joint residency with David Guetta at party hot spot Ibiza for the summer of 2012.

In October 2012, Nicky Romero received the DJ Mag 'Highest New Entry' award on DJ Mag's top 100 DJs fan poll, and with spot number 17, he is one of the highest new entries ever, together with Skrillex and Dash Berlin. In that same year, Romero collaborated with Swedish DJ/Producer, Avicii, to produce the highly anticipated single "I Could Be the One" which became a massive success across Europe, particularly in the United Kingdom, where the single debuted at number one on the UK Singles Chart on 17 February 2013 ― for the week ending on 23 February 2013 ― becoming both Romero and Avicii's first chart-topper in the UK. On the UK Dance Chart, "I Could Be the One" debuted at number one ahead of Baauer's "Harlem Shake", which entered at number two.

Following "I Could Be the One" in 2013, Romero released his long-awaited single, "Symphonica", that reached No. 1 on the overall Beatport Top 100 chart. His next release, a collaboration with Krewella, "Legacy" also saw Beatport chart success hitting the No. 1 spot. Romero then took on a collaboration with Sunnery James & Ryan Marciano, "S.O.T.U.", that he released on Steve Angello's Size Records. Amid his 2013 releases, he performed as a resident at The Light Las Vegas and he also played numerous major festivals including Ultra Music Festival, Coachella, Electric Daisy Carnival Las Vegas and Puerto Rico, Sensation White, and Tomorrowland, amongst others. One of his most notable gigs was at TomorrowWorld where he was one of the first music acts to present an interactive performance experience using Google Glass.

In October 2013, Romero ranked at number 7 on DJ Mag's Top 100 DJs annual fan poll. He helms his own weekly radio show, Protocol Radio and his own record label, Protocol Recordings.

=== 2014–present: Studio work ===
In June 2014 he released a song called "Feet On The Ground" with vocals by the Dutch singer Anouk. Beside his music, he is up for different kinds of charity projects, as '10.000 Hours – People Planet Party' which is made to help renovate playgrounds for disadvantaged kids.

"Legacy" was used as the backing track by Australian television network Channel Seven in on-air promotions for the 2014 season return of hit show Revenge. After the advertisement's high rotation during the high rating 2014 Australian Open, the song charted in Australia at number 50. In August 2014, Nicky partnered with EDM lifestyle brand Electric Family to produce a collaboration bracelet for which 100% of the proceeds are donated to Fuck Cancer. In November 2015, Romero indicated that he had been suffering from anxiety which forced him to reduce his touring commitments and scale back his studio work.

In 2018, Nicky Romero released a song with ROZES, titled "Where Would We Be".

=== Other productions ===
In addition to all "Nicky Romero" singles, he also co-produced the track "Right Now" (featuring David Guetta) from Rihanna's seventh studio album Unapologetic, which was released on 19 November 2012. Before his performance at Tomorrowland, he mentioned in an interview with MTV that he was also working on a new project with Rihanna. He co-wrote and produced "It Should Be Easy" by Britney Spears for her eighth studio album Britney Jean.

Romero also co-produced "Bang My Head" (featuring Sia) and "No Money No Love" from David Guetta's 2014 album titled Listen. Furthermore, he co-produced "Dragon Night" from Sekai no Owari's second studio album Tree.

== Other ventures ==
=== Protocol Recordings ===
Protocol Recordings
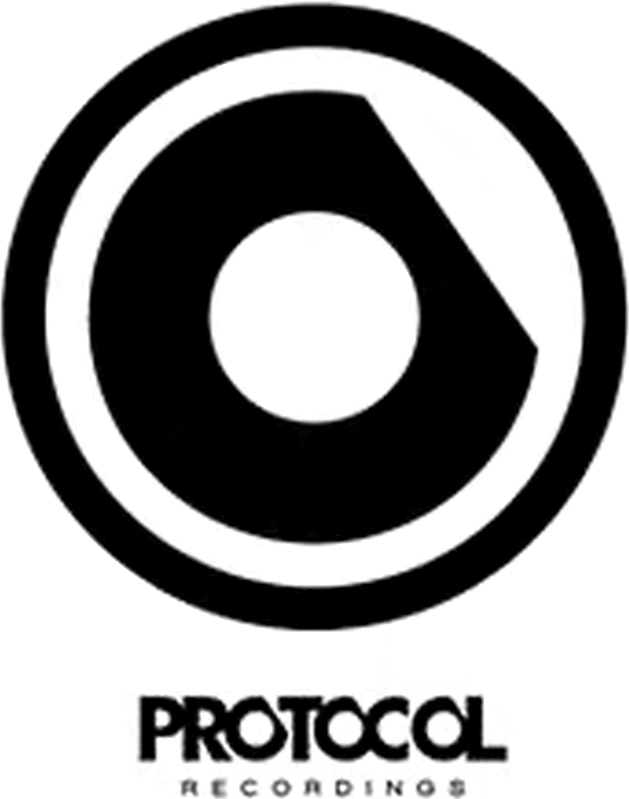
- Founded: May 8, 2012
- Founder: Nicky Romero
- Genre: House; electro house; progressive house; big room house
- Country of origin: Netherlands
- Location: Amsterdam, Netherlands
- Official website: protocolrecordings.com

Protocol Recordings is a Dutch record label founded on 8 May 2012 by electronic music producer and DJ Nicky Romero. They have released music by notable underground electronic artists such as Blasterjaxx, Don Diablo, R3hab, Vicetone, Stadiumx, Thomas Gold, Arno Cost and Volt & State. The label's first release was "WTF!?" by Nicky Romero and ZROQ.

Protocol Recordings has become a successful record label as a result of releases by Nicky Romero. The most successful international single from the label was Like Home by Nicky Romero and Australian duo NERVO, which reached 37th place in Sweden, 15th place in the general chart and 5th place in the dance chart of the Netherlands and 33rd place in the singles chart and 9th place in the dance chart of the United Kingdom.

Five releases have reached number one on the Beatport Top 100. Four of these have been produced by Nicky Romero and another, Howl At The Moon, produced by Hungarian duo StadiumX, which reached 59th place in the French SNEP chart.

Protocol Radio is a weekly podcast and syndicated radio show created in 2013 and is hosted by Nicky Romero. It comprises upcoming releases on Protocol Recordings and tracks that he supports.

In 2019, Romero joined fellow DJ, Steve Aoki, in his investment in the Rogue esports team.

In 2021 Nicky Romero expanded his output by delivering an in-depth music production masterclass for aspiring DJs and producers.

== Filmography ==
Romero made a cameo appearance in the 2015 film We Are Your Friends, starring Zac Efron. He appeared in the ending, playing himself during the movie's Summerfest party.
