= Nervo (DJs) =

Australian musical sibling duo

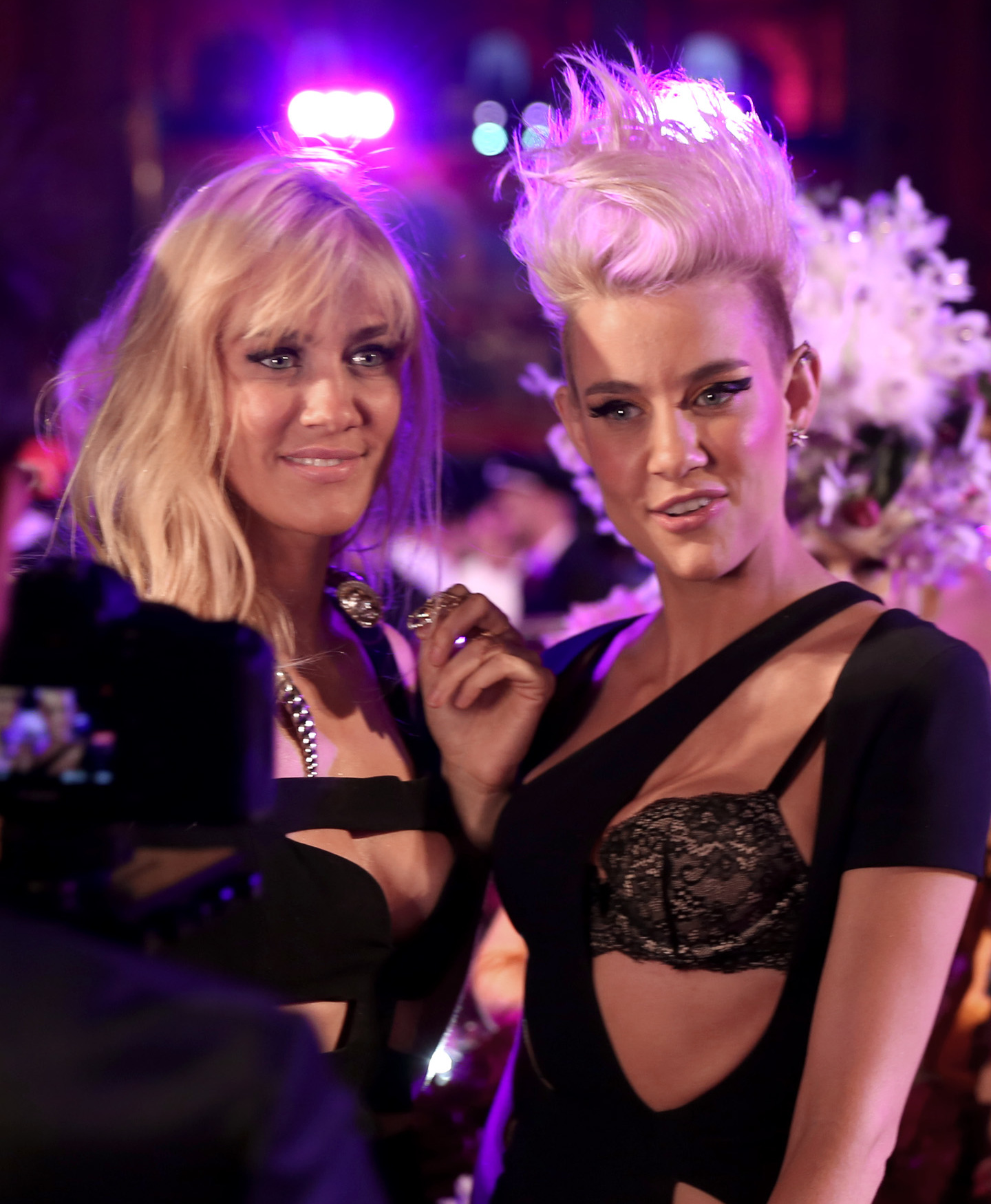
- Olivia (left) and Miriam Nervo at Life Ball 2014

Background information
- Also known as: Mim and Liv; The Nervo Twins
- Origin: Melbourne, Victoria, Australia
- Genres: EDM; electro house; progressive house
- Years active: 2004–present
- Labels: Ultra; Virgin; EMI; Spinnin'; Terminal; Moi Fox; Big Beat; Monstercat; Armada; Thrive Music
- Members: Miriam Nervo; Olivia Nervo
- Website: nervomusic.com

Nervo (stylised as NERVO) are an Australian DJ duo comprising twin sisters Olivia and Miriam Nervo (born 18 February 1982). After signing with Sony/ATV Music Publishing at 18 years of age, the sisters pursued careers as songwriting partners. In 2008, they signed with Fredrik Olsson and his Swedish music publishing company Razor Boy Music Publishing, which led to co-writing the Grammy Award-winning single, "When Love Takes Over", performed by David Guetta and Kelly Rowland. They have been producing and releasing their own music under the Nervo name since 2005, and released their debut album Collateral in 2015.

== Early life ==
The Nervo twins were born in Ivanhoe, Melbourne, on the night of 18 February 1982. In 2012, the twins told a reporter that they "almost have the same birthday", but in 2021 they said they share a birthday. Olivia was born first. Their parents were Flaviana Benedetti and Garry Nervo, who had established a dental practice together in 1975 in Whittlesea, Victoria, Australia, north of Melbourne. The Italian-heritage family included older sister Adele and younger brother Morris. Around 1992 the family moved to Ivanhoe, Victoria. The twins studied at Genazzano FCJ College, a girls school in Kew, where they participated in rowing and swimming, but were mainly involved in music. They completed Year 12 and graduated in 1999. The twins began their careers as models with the Australian Chadwick Models Agency.

== Career ==
When the sisters were sixteen, a modeling agency took an interest in the pair, but Liv Nervo stated in April 2012 that music "was always the focus" for them.

The sisters were accepted into the Opera Australia Academy, but decided to pursue a music career instead. A contract was then signed with Sony/ATV Music Publishing and the duo subsequently embarked on a songwriting career. Initial recognition for the pair occurred following the single "Negotiate with Love", written for British pop singer, Rachel Stevens, which reached tenth position in the United Kingdom (UK) music charts in 2005. Also in 2005, the duo released the single "Boobjob", which received substantial airplay in their native Australia. The duo went on to write for Kesha, Richard Grey, Sophie Ellis-Bextor, Ashley Tisdale and the Pussycat Dolls. Olivia Nervo is also credited by Dork with writer, background-vocal and additional-vocal contributions connected to Kesha, including work on "Boots & Boys", "VIP" and "Radio Radio Radio".

When their publishing deal was set to expire they considered dropping their songwriting career due to a dissatisfaction with the modest level of success they had experienced while with the major publisher. Instead they were persuaded to give it another chance by signing with Fredrik Olsson (Music Executive) and his Swedish music publishing company Razor Boy Music Publishing in 2008. The move reaped quick rewards when the new publisher arranged a writing session with Kelly Rowland through Universal A&R Max Gousse. The group co-wrote Guetta and Rowland's number one dance hit, "When Love Takes Over" which went on to win a Grammy Award, in addition to reaching the top position on numerous charts around the world. The song was also ranked the No. 1 dance pop collaboration of all time by Billboard.

The duo's official logo

In March 2010, Nervo announced a worldwide recording deal with Virgin Records/EMI Music, which included a joint venture to release new artists that Nervo discover and produce. They also served as ambassadors at the L'Oreal Fashion Festival. A month later, Nervo released their club single "This Kind of Love" through their independent UK-based dance record label, Loaded Records. It went number one on the world club charts, number two on the Music Week club charts and number six on the Music Week pop charts. In June 2010, Allison Iraheta released the single "Don't Waste the Pretty", co-written by Nervo. The twins also worked on records for Kylie Minogue's eleventh Aphrodite, Britney Spears, Cheryl Cole, Sophie Ellis-Bextor, Armin Van Buuren and for Kelly Rowland's self-titled, third studio album. They also released the single "Irresistible" on Positiva/Armada, which reached number one on the UK Club Chart.

In 2012, NERVO were announced as spokesmodels for CoverGirl, appearing in promotional and digital campaigns for the brand's Outlast Stay Brilliant Nail Gloss collection. Glamour also profiled the duo in connection with the campaign. The campaign also included commercial and print advertising work.

In July, after DJing at Belgium's Tomorrowland, they wrote a track with Afrojack, "The Way We See The World (Tomorrowland Anthem)" and followed this with "We're All No One" featuring Afrojack and Steve Aoki which reached number 27 on the UK Dance charts. In August, Nervo signed with modeling agency, Wilhelmina Models. They were also featured in Pacha magazine. They wrote the track "Night of Your Life" performed by Jennifer Hudson on David Guetta's new album Nothing but the Beat. They wrote, vocally produced and arranged Agnes Carlsson's single "Don't Go Breaking My Heart". The group also wrote Nicole Scherzinger's single "Try With Me".

In 2011, the sisters began hosting a monthly show on Sirius Radio called "Nervonation".

The single "You're Gonna Love Again" was leaked in 2011 and reached the No. 1 position on the Hype Machine chart. It was officially released in 2012.

Nervo began their 2013 music production schedule with "Like Home", with Nicky Romero, followed by the Nervo single "Hold On", which was released to iTunes on 9 April. The music video for "Hold On" was released on 19 April and uploaded to their VEVO channel on YouTube. In June 2013, Nervo were featured on the cover of Spanish magazine S Moda and a feature article that included further posed photographs was published on the magazine's website in May. In July 2013 Nervo wrote Daichi Miura's single "GO FOR IT". In November they also worked on records for Daichi Miura's fourth "The Entertainer", which reached No. 5 on the Japan chart. In 2013, NERVO performed as part of BBC Radio 1's Ibiza coverage, appearing on a line-up that also included Pete Tong, Solomun, George FitzGerald and Chris Malinchak. On 24 February 2015, the twins released a new single titled "It Feels." In March, they also collaborated with Kreayshawn, Dev and Alisa Ueno for "Hey Ricky". Both "Hey Ricky" and "It Feels" appear on their forthcoming debut artist album Collateral, set for release on 24 July 2015.

Also, from Collateral, was "The Other Boys" featuring Kylie Minogue, Jake Shears and Nile Rodgers, was a remix single that was released on 23 October 2015.

In 2016, the Nervo song "People Grinnin'" served as the foundation for a video produced by eight universities led by the University of South Wales. The video was part of an Australian campaign to attract more women to engineering programs. In the video, the Nervo twins are shown as futuristic androids designed by women engineers.

In 2017, A3 enlisted Nervo for his remix of Guns N' Roses' "November Rain".

In 2018, the duo's collaboration with Sofi Tukker, the Knocks and Alisa Ueno on the former's “Best Friend” (used in a 2017 television commercial for iPhone X) gave Nervo their first number one on Billboard's Dance/Mix Show Airplay Chart in its January 20, 2018 issue. In June, the Fédération Internationale de Volleyball (FIVB) and Nervo teamed up to have their song "Worlds Collide" be the anthem for the FIVB Volleyball Nations League (VNL) for men and women. Nervo first performed "Worlds Collide" live in Ottawa, Canada for the Canada vs. USA men's match on June 10. Nervo also performed the song live at the Women's VNL Finals in Nanjing, China and the Men's VNL Finals in Lille, France.

In October 2021, Nervo's song "Horizon" was used in a mini art film created within the Las Vegas mega-club Omnia. This mini art film was the first installment of One. One is a project series with content focused on storytelling, music, dance, and exotic locations, all with a dance music sound and Cirque du Soleil flair.

=== Film and television ===
In May 2013, the duo filmed scenes for the soap opera One Life to Live that included dialogue in addition to their performing DJ roles. The women also appeared on episode 6 of the TV show Styled to Rock.

They are profiled in the 2020 documentary film Underplayed, which examines gender inequality in electronic music. In connection with the film, NERVO were featured in the October issue of FASHION magazine, where they discussed their experiences as women in electronic music, their participation in the documentary, and balancing motherhood with their music careers.

In 2021, NERVO released the single "Pickle" with Paris Hilton and Tinie Tempah. Entertainment Focus reported that the track featured vocals from Hilton, a rap from Tinie Tempah, and backing vocals and production from NERVO, while Beat Night MX reported that the single was released through Smash The House.

In 2023, Mim and Liv were part of BePlaying: The Voices Behind the Sound. They discussed starting out in music, moving to London at the age of 19, collaborations with artists including Paris Hilton and Natasha Bedingfield, and how motherhood and grief influenced their later compositions.

== Advocacy ==
NERVO have campaigned against child trafficking and forced child labour, partnering with organisations including Our Hopeland. In 2022, the duo released music and performed at Tomorrowland to raise awareness of the issue.

== Personal lives ==
The Nervo twins collaborated with the child advocacy group Hopeland on a campaign to raise awareness of child labour, child trafficking and the movement of children into orphanages for profit. They wrote a song called "Is Someone Looking For Me" as part of the campaign.

=== Miriam ===
On 31 December 2018, the twins announced via an Instagram post that they were both pregnant. In February 2019 Miriam gave birth to a daughter with her partner, radio and television announcer Oriol Sabat. Miriam and Oriol had another daughter in February 2022.

=== Olivia ===
In May 2019 Olivia Nervo gave birth to a daughter with businessman Matthew Pringle. In March 2021, DJane Mag reported that the twins had posted on Instagram about Pringle's deception, stating that he had not told Liv that he already had another long-term partner and family, and that Liv's daughter had not met Pringle, her biological father.

The story was also reported in New Zealand by The New Zealand Herald, which published a feature on Nervo, Pringle and the circumstances surrounding their relationship. In 2026, Nervo's case received public attention in connection with reproductive coercion. In March 2026, her case was raised by Natalie Fleet MP during a Westminster Hall debate on reproductive coercion. Fleet said that Nervo's story was important to hear "in the public interest", and described it as an example of how reproductive coercion, post-separation abuse and family court proceedings can intersect. Stella Creasy MP also intervened in the debate, describing the case as raising issues relevant to the family courts review announced by Baroness Levitt. Responding for the Government, Justice Minister Alex Davies-Jones acknowledged that Olivia and Mim Nervo had worked with parliamentarians to raise awareness of reproductive coercion and post-separation abuse, while stating that she could not comment on individual cases or court decisions. The National Business Review also reported on the debate in New Zealand, describing Pringle as being at the centre of a campaign to better recognise reproductive coercion in law.

In January 2026, the Good Law Project published an article about Nervo’s campaign concerning reproductive coercion. The article stated that Good Law Project was assisting Nervo in telling her story, and included an update that some details were reinstated on 18 February 2026 following legal correspondence. The case later received further public attention when it was reported by The Guardian in relation to calls for reproductive coercion to be recognised as a standalone offence. UCL News also highlighted the Guardian article, identifying Professor Sonja Ayeb-Karlsson of UCL Risk & Disaster Reduction as commenting on coercive control in the article.

The case was also discussed by Women's Agenda, which described Nervo's experience as part of a broader debate about how reproductive coercion is framed and recognised by legal and social systems.

In May 2026, the Good Law Project reported that Meta had reinstated a video about Nervo’s reproductive coercion campaign after previously restricting it in the UK. The organisation said Meta had initially cited “a legal request related to a report from a third party”. The Transparency Project later discussed the incident, stating that it could see no legitimate basis for the removal of the Good Law Project post, while noting that other posts about the case might have raised separate reporting-restriction issues depending on their content.

The story was also reported in New Zealand by The New Zealand Herald, which published a feature on Nervo, Pringle and the circumstances surrounding their relationship.

In September 2026, Cosmopolitan UK published a feature on reproductive coercion that included the experiences of Nervo and another woman, identified as Ebony Keeley. The article described Nervo's account of her relationship with Matthew Pringle, including her discovery during pregnancy that he had maintained other relationships and already had a child. Nervo said that she later understood her experience as reproductive coercion and discussed its impact on her and her daughter.

== Discography ==
- Collateral (2015)

== DJ Magazine Top 100 DJs ==
Year	Position	Ref.
2012	46	
2013	16	
2014	21	
2015	24	
2016	45	
2017	42	
2018	27	
2019	24	
2020	20	
2021	18	
2022	40	
2023	48	
2024	50	
2025	63	

== See also ==
- List of Billboard number-one dance club songs
- List of artists who reached number one on the U.S. Dance Club Songs chart
- List of artists who reached number one on the U.S. dance airplay chart
