= Steve Aoki discography =

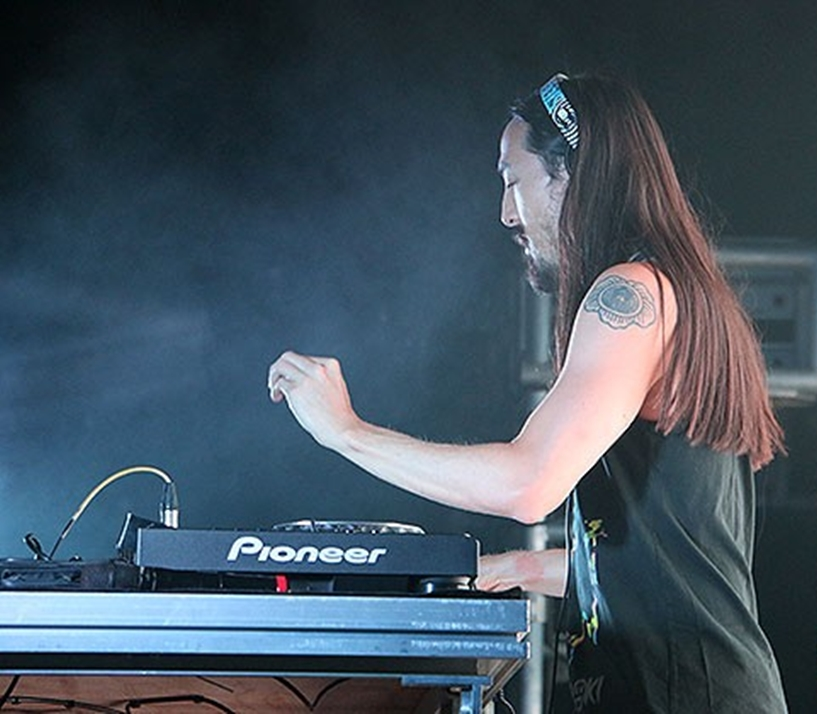
- Studio albums: 9
- EPs: 5
- Compilation albums: 1
- Singles: 108
- Music videos: 46
- Remix albums: 5

American electro house DJ and producer Steve Aoki has released nine studio albums, five extended plays, and over 100 singles (including four as a featured artist).

== Albums ==
=== Studio albums ===
List of studio albums, with selected chart positions
Title	Details	Peak chart positions									Certifications
Title	Details	US	US Dance	US Ind.	AUT	BEL (FL)	BEL (WA)	CAN	SWI	UK Dance	Certifications
Wonderland	Released: January 10, 2012 (US); Labels: Dim Mak, Ultra; Formats: CD, streaming, digital download	59	6	7	—	199	—	—	—	—	
Neon Future I	Released: September 30, 2014 (US); Labels: Ultra, Dim Mak; Formats: CD, streaming, digital download	32	1	4	64	68	96	18	71	—	RIAA: Gold
Neon Future II	Released: May 12, 2015; Labels: Ultra, Dim Mak; Formats: CD, streaming, digital download	66	2	7	—	93	132	25	—	36	
Steve Aoki Presents Kolony	Released: July 21, 2017; Label: Ultra; Formats: LP, streaming, digital download	195	5	31	—	136	—	—	—	—	
Neon Future III	Released: November 9, 2018; Labels: Ultra, Dim Mak; Formats: CD, streaming, digital download	153	1	43	—	—	—	69	—	—	
Neon Future IV	Released: April 3, 2020; Labels: Ultra, Dim Mak; Formats: CD, streaming, digital download	—	11	—	—	—	—	—	—	—	
Hiroquest: Genesis	Released: September 16, 2022; Labels: Dim Mak, DJ Kid Millionaire; Formats: CD, streaming, digital download	—	4	—	—	—	—	—	—	—	
Hiroquest 2: Double Helix	Released: November 17, 2023; Label: Dim Mak, DJ Kid Millionaire; Formats: CD, streaming, digital download	—	—	—	—	—	—	—	—	—	
Paragon	Released: June 28, 2024; Label: DJ Kid Millionaire; Formats: CD, streaming, digital download	—	—	—	—	—	—	—	—	—	
Hiroquest 3: Paragon	Released: June 27, 2025; Label: Dim Mak, DJ Kid Millionaire; Formats: CD, LP, streaming, digital download	—	—	—	—	—	—	—	—	—	
"—" denotes a recording that did not chart or was not released in that territory.

=== Compilation albums ===
List of compilation albums
Title	Details
Neon Future Odyssey	Released: October 2, 2015 (US); Labels: Ultra, Dim Mak; Formats: LP, streaming, digital download

=== Remix albums ===
List of remix albums
Title	Details
Wonderland (Remixed)	Released: July 10, 2012 (US); Labels: Dim Mak, Ultra; Formats: Digital download, streaming
Neon Future III (Remixes)	Released: February 15, 2019 (US); Labels: Dim Mak, Ultra; Formats: Digital download, streaming
Neon Future IV (Remixes)	Released: May 22, 2020 (US); Labels: Dim Mak, Ultra; Formats: Digital download, streaming
Hiroquest: Genesis Remixed	Released: November 11, 2022; Labels: Dim Mak, DJ Kid Millionaire; Formats: Digital download, streaming
Hiroquest: Double Helix Remixed	Released: January 26, 2024; Labels: Dim Mak, DJ Kid Millionaire; Formats: Digital download, streaming

=== DJ mix albums ===
List of remix albums
Title	Details
I Love Techno 2010 (Mixed by Steve Aoki)	Released: October 4, 2010 (US); Labels: Lektroluv, N.E.W.S.; Formats: Digital download
Tomorrowland 2018: Steve Aoki (DJ Mix)	Released: July 20, 2018 (US); Labels: independent; Formats: Digital download
Tomorrowland Around The World 2020: Steve Aoki (DJ Mix)	Released: August 5, 2020 (US); Labels: independent; Formats: Digital download
Tomorrowland Winter 2022: Steve Aoki at Crystal Garden (DJ Mix)	Released: March 26, 2022 (US); Labels: independent; Formats: Digital download
Tomorrowland Winter 2022: Steve Aoki at Mainstage (DJ Mix)	Released: March 30, 2022 (US); Labels: independent; Formats: Digital download
Tomorrowland 2022: Steve Aoki at Mainstage, Weekend 2 (DJ Mix)	Released: August 26, 2022 (US); Labels: independent; Formats: Digital download

=== Mixtapes ===
List of mixtapes, with selected chart positions
Title	Details	Peak chart positions	
Title	Details	US Dance	US Heat.
Pillowface and His Airplane Chronicles	Released: October 16, 2007 (US); Label: Thrive; Formats: CD, digital download	8	23

=== Video albums ===
List of video albums
Title	Details
Deadmeat: Live at Roseland Ballroom	Released: October 9, 2012 (US); Labels: Dim Mak, Ultra; Formats: DVD

== Extended plays ==
List of extended plays, with selected chart positions
Title	Details	Peak chart positions
Title	Details	US Dance
It's the End of the World as We Know It	Released: December 11, 2012 (US); Label: Dim Mak; Format: Digital download, streaming	—
A Light That Never Comes (Remixes) (featuring Linkin Park)	Released: January 21, 2014 (US); Labels: Dim Mak, Warner Bros.; Format: Digital download, streaming	—
4OKI	Released: July 29, 2016 (US); Label: Dim Mak; Format: Digital download, streaming	24
5OKI	Released: April 27, 2018 (US); Label: Dim Mak; Format: Digital download, streaming	—
6OKI - Rave Royale	Released: January 22, 2021; Label: Dim Mak; Format: Digital download, streaming	—
"—" denotes a recording that did not chart or was not released in that territory.

== Singles ==
=== As lead artist ===
List of singles as lead artist, with selected chart positions and certifications, showing year released and album name
Title	Year	Peak chart positions										Certifications	Album
Title	Year	US	US Dance	AUS	BEL (FL)	BEL (WA)	CAN	FRA	GER	NLD	UK	Certifications	Album
"I'm in the House" (featuring Zuper Blahq)	2010	—	— (Note: "I'm in the House" did not enter the Hot Dance/Electronic Songs, but peaked at number 19 on the Dance/Electronic Digital Song Sales chart.)	—	43	—	—	—	—	40	29		Non-album singles
"Brrrat!" (with Armand Van Helden)	2010	—	—	—	—	—	—	—	—	—	—		Non-album singles
"Wake Up Call" (with Sidney Samson)	2010	—	—	—	—	—	—	—	—	—	—		Non-album singles
"Turbulence" (with Laidback Luke featuring Lil Jon)	2011	—	— (Note: "Turbulence" did not enter the Hot Dance/Electronic Songs chart, but peaked at number 27 on the Dance/Electronic Digital Song Sales chart.)	37	—	—	—	—	—	—	66		Non-album singles
"No Beef" (with Afrojack featuring Miss Palmer)	2011	—	— (Note: "No Beef" did not enter the Hot Dance/Electronic Songs chart, but peaked at number 48 on the Dance/Electronic Digital Songs chart.)	—	— (Note: "No Beef" did not enter the Flanders Ultratop 50, but peaked at number five on the Ultratip chart.)	— (Note: "No Beef" did not enter the Wallonia Ultratop 50, but peaked at number 21 on the Ultratip chart.)	—	42	—	23	25	NVPI: Gold	Non-album singles
"Earthquakey People" (featuring Rivers Cuomo)	2011	—	—	—	—	—	—	—	—	—	—		Wonderland
"Tornado" (with Tiësto)	2011	—	— (Note: "Tornado" did not enter the Hot Dance/Electronic Songs chart, but peaked at number 39 on the Dance/Electronic Digital Song Sales chart.)	—	—	—	—	—	—	—	—		Non-album single
"Ladi Dadi" (featuring Wynter Gordon)	2011	—	—	—	— (Note: "Ladi Dadi" did not enter the Flanders Ultratop 50, but peaked at number 45 on the Ultratip chart.)	—	—	—	—	—	—		Wonderland
"Livin' My Love" (featuring LMFAO and Nervo)	2012	—	— (Note: "Livin' My Love" did not enter the Hot Dance/Electronic Songs chart, but peaked at number 28 on the Dance/Electronic Digital Song Sales chart.)	—	—	—	68	—	—	—	—		Wonderland
"Cudi the Kid" (featuring Kid Cudi and Travis Barker)	2012	—	—	—	—	—	—	—	—	—	—		Wonderland
"Beat Down" (with Angger Dimas featuring Iggy Azalea)	2012	—	—	—	— (Note: "Beat Down" did not enter the Flanders Ultratop 50, but peaked at number 59 on the Ultratip chart.)	—	—	—	—	59	44		Wonderland (Remixed)
"Phat Brahms" (with Angger Dimas vs. Dimitri Vegas & Like Mike)	2012	—	—	—	—	—	—	—	—	—	—		Non-album single
"Singularity" (with Angger Dimas featuring My Name Is Kay)	2013	—	—	—	—	—	—	—	—	—	—		It's the End of the World as We Know It
"Omega" (featuring Miss Palmer and Dan Sena)	2013	—	—	—	—	—	—	—	—	—	—		It's the End of the World as We Know It
"Boneless" (with Chris Lake and Tujamo)	2013	— (Note: "Boneless" did not enter the Billboard Hot 100, but peaked at number 25 on the Bubbling Under Hot 100 Singles chart.)	17	—	— (Note: "Boneless" did not enter the Flanders Ultratop 50, but peaked at number 23 on the Ultratip chart.)	44	— (Note: "Boneless" did not enter the Billboard Canadian Hot 100, but peaked at number 74 on the Hot Canadian Digital Song Sales chart.)	96	49	—	162	ARIA: Gold; BVMI: Gold	Non-album singles
"Flight" (with R3hab)	2013	—	—	—	—	—	—	—	—	—	—		Non-album singles
"A Light That Never Comes" (with Linkin Park)	2013	65	8	56	—	— (Note: "A Light That Never Comes" did not enter the Wallonia Ultratop 50, but peaked at number 22 on the Ultratip chart.)	51	81	8	—	34		Recharged
"Bring You to Life (Transcend)" (with Rune RK featuring RAS)	2013	—	44	—	—	—	—	—	—	—	—		Non-album singles
"Can't Stop the Swag" (with Coone)	2014	—	—	—	—	—	—	—	—	—	—		Non-album singles
"Feedback" (with Autoerotique vs. Dimitri Vegas & Like Mike)	2014	—	—	—	—	—	—	—	—	—	—		Non-album singles
"Freak" (with Diplo and Deorro featuring Steve Bays)	2014	—	33	—	— (Note: "Freak" did not enter the Flanders Ultratop 50, but peaked at number 68 on the Ultratip chart.)	—	—	—	—	—	—		Non-album singles
"Rage the Night Away" (featuring Waka Flocka Flame)	2014	—	20	—	—	—	—	—	—	—	—		Neon Future I
"Delirious (Boneless)" (with Chris Lake and Tujamo featuring Kid Ink)	2014	90	9	—	—	—	81	—	—	—	—	RIAA: Gold; MC: Platinum	Neon Future I
"Free the Madness" (featuring Machine Gun Kelly)	2014	—	—	—	—	—	—	—	—	—	—		Neon Future I
"Get Me Outta Here" (featuring Flux Pavilion)	2014	—	28	—	—	—	—	—	—	—	—		Neon Future I
"Born to Get Wild" (featuring will.i.am)	2014	—	—	—	— (Note: "Born to Get Wild" did not enter the Flanders Ultratop 50, but peaked at number 58 on the Ultratip chart.)	—	—	—	—	—	—		Neon Future I
"Cake Face"	2015	—	—	—	—	—	—	—	—	—	—		Non-album single
"I Love It When You Cry (Moxoki)" (with Moxie Raia)	2015	—	22	—	—	—	—	—	—	—	—		Neon Future II
"Darker Than Blood" (featuring Linkin Park)	2015	—	36	—	—	—	—	—	—	—	—		Neon Future II
"Lightning Strikes" (with NERVO and Tony Junior)	2015	—	—	—	—	—	—	—	—	—	—		Neon Future II
"The Power of Now" (with Headhunterz)	2015	—	—	—	—	—	—	—	—	—	—		Neon Future Odyssey
"Phenomena" (with Borgore)	2015	—	—	—	—	—	—	—	—	—	—		Neon Future Odyssey
"Feel (The Power of Now)" (with Headhunterz)	2016	—	—	—	—	—	—	—	—	—	—		Non-album singles
"Can't Go Home" (with Felix Jaehn featuring Adam Lambert)	2016	—	35	—	—	—	—	—	—	—	—		Non-album singles
"Melody" (with Dimitri Vegas & Like Mike vs. Ummet Ozcan)	2016	—	—	—	12	—	—	—	—	—	—	BEA: Gold	Non-album singles
"Back 2 U" (with Boehm featuring Walk the Moon)	2016	—	23	—	—	—	—	—	—	—	—		Non-album singles
"How Else" (featuring Rich the Kid and iLoveMakonnen)	2016	—	47	—	—	—	—	—	—	—	—		Steve Aoki Presents Kolony
"ILYSM" (with Autoerotique)	2016	—	—	—	—	—	—	—	—	—	—		4OKI
"Dope Girlz" (with Shaun Frank)	2016	—	—	—	—	—	—	—	—	—	—		4OKI
"Bring the Funk Back" (with Reid Stefan)	2016	—	—	—	—	—	—	—	—	—	—		4OKI
"What We Started" (with Don Diablo and Lush & Simon featuring BullySongs)	2016	—	—	—	—	— (Note: "What We Started" did not enter the Wallonia Ultratop 50, but peaked at number 13 on the Ultratip chart.)	—	—	—	—	—		Neon Future III
"Kids" (with Morten)	2016	—	—	—	—	—	—	—	—	—	—		4OKI
"Be Yourself" (with Deorro)	2016	—	—	—	—	—	—	—	—	—	—		Non-album singles
"Supernova (Interstellar)" (with Marnik featuring Lil Jon)	2016	—	—	—	—	—	—	—	—	—	—		Non-album singles
"Just Hold On" (with Louis Tomlinson)	2016	52	7	20	26	38	40	8	32	27	2	RIAA: Gold; ARIA: Platinum; BEA: Gold; BPI: Platinum; BVMI: Gold; MC: Platinum; SNEP: Gold	Neon Future III
"Alive" (featuring Young Egypt)	2017	—	—	—	—	—	—	—	—	—	—		Non-album single
"Without U" (with DVBBS featuring 2 Chainz)	2017	—	—	—	—	—	—	—	—	—	—		Steve Aoki Presents Kolony
"Night Call" (featuring Lil Yachty and Migos)	2017	—	— (Note: "Night Call" did not enter the Hot Dance/Electronic Songs chart, but peaked at number 20 on the Dance/Electronic Digital Song Sales chart.)	—	—	—	—	—	—	—	—		Steve Aoki Presents Kolony
"Lit" (with Yellow Claw featuring Gucci Mane and T-Pain)	2017	—	34	—	—	—	—	—	—	—	—		Steve Aoki Presents Kolony
"Darker Than the Light That Never Bleeds" (Chester Forever Steve Aoki Remix) (with Linkin Park)	2017	—	— (Note: "Darker than the Light That Never Bleeds" did not enter the Hot Dance/Electronic Songs chart, but peaked at number 20 on the Dance/Electronic Digital Song Sales chart.)	—	—	—	—	—	—	—	—		Non-album single
"$4,000,000" (with Bad Royale featuring Ma$e and Big Gigantic)	2017	—	—	—	—	—	—	—	—	—	—		Steve Aoki Presents Kolony
"All Night" (with Lauren Jauregui)	2017	— (Note: "All Night" did not enter the Billboard Hot 100, but peaked at number 36 on the Hot Digital Song Sales chart.)	9	—	—	—	—	196	—	—	—		Neon Future III
"We Are Legend" (with Dimitri Vegas & Like Mike featuring Abigail Breslin)	2017	—	—	—	—	—	—	—	—	—	—		Non-album single
"Azukita" (featuring Daddy Yankee, Play-N-Skillz and Elvis Crespo)	2018	—	16	—	—	—	—	131	—	—	—	RIAA: 2× Platinum (Latin)	Neon Future III
"PLUR Genocide" (with Carnage featuring Lockdown)	2018	—	—	—	—	—	—	—	—	—	—		Battered Bruised & Bloody
"Mayhem" (with Quintino)	2018	—	—	—	—	—	—	—	—	—	—		5OKI
"Pika Pika" (with LOOPERS)	2018	—	—	—	—	—	—	—	—	—	—		5OKI
"It's Time" (with Laidback Luke featuring Bruce Buffer)	2018	—	—	—	—	—	—	—	—	—	—		5OKI
"Anthem" (with Hardwell featuring Kris Kiss)	2018	—	—	—	—	—	—	—	—	—	—		5OKI
"Moshi Moshi" (with Vini Vici featuring Mama Aoki)	2018	—	—	—	—	—	—	—	—	—	—		5OKI
"Pretender" (featuring Lil Yachty and AJR)	2018	—	24	—	—	—	—	—	—	—	—		Neon Future III
"Bella Ciao" (with Marnik)	2018	—	—	—	—	—	—	—	—	—	—		Non-album singles
"Shakalaka" (with Deorro, MAKJ and Max Styler)	2018	—	—	—	—	—	—	—	—	—	—		Non-album singles
"Lie to Me" (featuring Ina Wroldsen)	2018	—	—	—	—	—	—	—	—	—	—		Neon Future III
"Be Somebody" (with Nicky Romero featuring Kiiara)	2018	—	30	—	—	—	—	—	—	—	—		Neon Future III
"Jaleo" (with Nicky Jam)	2018	—	19	—	—	—	—	—	—	—	—		Non-album single
"Hoovela" (with Twiig)	2018	—	—	—	—	—	—	—	—	—	—		Neon Future III
"Waste It on Me" (featuring BTS)	2018	89	6	61	—	—	64	—	98	—	57	RIAA: Gold; MC: Platinum	Neon Future III
"Are You Lonely" (with Alan Walker featuring Isák)	2019	—	33	—	—	—	—	—	—	—	—		Neon Future IV
"Hit Your Heart" (with Dagny)	2019	—	—	—	—	—	—	—	—	—	—		Non-album single
"Play It Cool" (with Monsta X)	2019	—	20	—	—	—	—	—	—	—	—		Neon Future IV
"Do It Again" (with Alok)	2019	—	—	—	—	—	—	—	—	—	—		Neon Future IV
"Rave" (with Showtek and Makj featuring Kris Kiss)	2019	—	—	—	—	—	—	—	—	—	—		Neon Future IV
"Crash Into Me" (with Darren Criss)	2019	—	48	—	—	—	—	—	—	—	—		Neon Future IV
"Hava" (with Timmy Trumpet featuring Dr Phunk)	2019	—	—	—	—	—	—	—	—	—	—		Neon Future IV
"Let It Be Me" (featuring Backstreet Boys)	2019	—	12	— (Note: "Let It Be Me" did not enter the ARIA Singles Chart, but peaked at number 39 on the ARIA Digital Track Chart.)	— (Note: "Let It Be Me" did not enter the Flanders Ultratop 50, but peaked at number 36 on the Ultratip chart.)	—	—	—	—	—	—		Neon Future IV
"Send It" (with Will Sparks)	2019	—	—	—	—	—	—	—	—	—	—		Non-album single
"I Wanna Rave" (with Bassjackers)	2019	—	—	—	—	—	—	—	—	—	—		Neon Future IV and The Biggest
"2 in a Million" (with Sting and Shaed)	2019	—	39	—	—	—	—	—	—	—	—		Neon Future IV
"Popcorn" (with Ummet Ozcan and Dzeko)	2019	—	—	—	—	—	—	—	—	—	—		Neon Future IV
"Maldad" (with Maluma)	2020	—	—	—	—	—	—	—	—	—	—		Neon Future IV
"Halfway Dead" (featuring Global Dan and Travis Barker)	2020	—	38	—	—	—	—	—	—	—	—		Neon Future IV
"Love You More" (featuring Lay and will.i.am)	2020	—	—	—	—	—	—	—	—	—	—		Neon Future IV
"One True Love" (with Slushii)	2020	—	—	—	—	—	—	—	—	—	—		Neon Future IV
"I Love My Friends" (featuring Icona Pop)	2020	—	—	—	—	—	—	—	—	—	—		Neon Future IV
"Dale Cintura (Kuliki)" (with Darell and Farina featuring Play-N-Skillz, Kiko El Crazy and Toño Rosario)	2020	—	—	—	—	—	—	—	—	—	—		Non-album single
"Last of Me" (featuring Runn)	2020	—	—	—	—	—	—	—	—	—	—		Arknights
"Imagine" (with Frank Walker featuring AJ Mitchell)	2020	—	42	—	—	—	—	—	—	—	—		Non-album singles
"Lies" (with Kream)	2020	—	—	—	—	—	—	—	—	—	—		Non-album singles
"Tarantino" (with Timmy Trumpet featuring Starx)	2020	—	—	—	—	—	—	—	—	—	—		6OKI – Rave Royale
"My Way" (with Aloe Blacc)	2020	—	—	—	—	—	—	—	—	—	—		Non-album singles
"End Like This" (with Yellow Claw featuring Runn)	2020	—	—	—	—	—	—	—	—	—	—		Non-album singles
"BIB" (with K?d)	2021	—	—	—	—	—	—	—	—	—	—		6OKI – Rave Royale
"Close to You" (with Brennan Heart featuring PollyAnna)	2021	—	—	—	—	—	—	—	—	—	—		Non-album singles
"Mambo" (with Willy William featuring El Alfa, Sean Paul, Sfera Ebbasta and Play-N-Skillz)	2021	—	41	—	—	—	—	—	—	—	—		Non-album singles
"Give Me the Night" (with George Benson)	2021	—	—	—	—	—	—	—	—	—	—		Non-album singles
"Used to Be" (with Kiiara and Wiz Khalifa)	2021	—	10	—	—	—	—	—	—	—	—		Non-album singles
"Aire" (with Farruko)	2021	—	36	—	—	—	—	—	—	—	—		Non-album singles
"Rubble to Gold" (with Jungleboi featuring Sam Calver)	2021	—	—	—	—	—	—	—	—	—	—		Non-album singles
"Complicated" (with Yves V featuring Ryan Caraveo)	2021	—	—	—	—	—	—	—	—	—	—		Non-album singles
"Losing My Religion" (with Gattüso featuring Mkla)	2021	—	—	—	—	—	—	—	—	—	—		Non-album singles
"Siliwa Hay" (with Chemical Surf and Zafrir featuring Max-Africana)	2021	—	—	—	—	—	—	—	—	—	—		Non-album singles
"Music Means Love Forever" (with Armin van Buuren)	2021	—	—	—	—	—	—	—	—	—	—		Non-album singles
"Aurora" (with Ninja Attack)	2021	—	—	—	—	—	—	—	—	—	—		Non-album singles
"End of the World" (with End of the World)	2021	—	—	—	—	—	—	—	—	—	—		Non-album singles
"Equal in the Darkness" (with Jolin Tsai and Max)	2021	—	—	—	—	—	—	—	—	—	—		Non-album singles
"Stars Don't Shine" (featuring Global Dan)	2021	—	—	—	—	—	—	—	—	—	—		Hiroquest: Genesis
"Typical" (with Alok featuring Lars Martin)	2021	—	—	—	—	—	—	—	—	—	—		Non-album singles
"Welcome to the Playhouse" (with DJ Diesel)	2022	—	—	—	—	—	—	—	—	—	—		Non-album singles
"Da Homies" (with MT11)	2022	—	—	—	—	—	—	—	—	—	—		Non-album singles
"Kult" (with Grandson featuring Jasiah)	2022	—	—	—	—	—	—	—	—	—	—		Hiroquest: Genesis
"Stop The World" (with Marnik and Leony)	2022	—	—	—	—	—	—	—	—	—	—		Hiroquest: Genesis
"Save Me" (with HRVY)	2022	—	—	—	—	—	—	—	—	—	—		Hiroquest: Genesis
"Kong 2.0" (with Natanael Cano)	2022	—	—	—	—	—	—	—	—	—	—		Hiroquest: Genesis
"Just Us Two" (with Taking Back Sunday)	2022	—	—	—	—	—	—	—	—	—	—		Hiroquest: Genesis
"Whole Again" (with KAAZE featuring John Martin)	2022	—	—	—	—	—	—	—	—	—	—		Hiroquest: Genesis
"The Whistle" (with Timmy Trumpet and DJ Aligator)	2022	—	—	—	—	—	—	—	—	—	—		Hiroquest: Genesis
"Ultimate" (with Santa Fe Klan featuring Snow Tha Product)	2022	—	—	—	—	—	—	—	—	—	—		Hiroquest: Genesis
"New York" (with Regard and Mazie)	2023	—	32	—	—	—	—	—	—	—	—		Hiroquest 2: Double Helix
"Diferente" (with CNCO)	2023	—	46	—	—	—	—	—	—	—	—		Hiroquest 2: Double Helix
"Hungry Heart" (with Galantis and Hayley Kiyoko)	2023	—	39	—	—	—	—	—	—	—	—		Hiroquest 2: Double Helix
"Wild" (with Vini Vici)	2023	—	—	—	—	—	—	—	—	—	—		Hiroquest 2: Double Helix
"Older" (with Dixie D'Amelio and Jimmie Allen)	2023	—	—	—	—	—	—	—	—	—	—		Non-album single
"2 Much 2 Handle" (with Alok)	2023	—	—	—	—	—	—	—	—	—	—		Hiroquest 2: Double Helix
"Invítame a un Café" (with Ángela Aguilar)	2023	—	—	—	—	—	—	—	—	—	—		Hiroquest 2: Double Helix
"Motor" (with Quintino)	2023	—	—	—	—	—	—	—	—	—	—		Hiroquest 2: Double Helix
"Won't Forget This Time" (with Kaaze & John Martin)	2023	—	—	—	—	—	—	—	—	—	—		Hiroquest 2: Double Helix
"Locked Up" (with Trinix featuring Akon)	2023	—	—	—	—	—	—	—	—	—	—		Hiroquest 2: Double Helix
"Kids" (with Tony Junior)	2023	—	—	—	—	—	—	—	—	—	—		Hiroquest 2: Double Helix
"Paranoia" (with Danna Paola)	2023	—	—	—	—	—	—	—	—	—	—		Hiroquest 2: Double Helix
"Lighter" (with Paris Hilton)	2023	—	—	—	—	—	—	—	—	—	—		Hiroquest 2: Double Helix
"Heavenly Hell" (with Ne-Yo)	2024	—	—	—	—	—	—	—	—	—	—		Paragon and Hiroquest 3: Paragon
"Nervous System" (with Koven)	2024	—	—	—	—	—	—	—	—	—	—		Moments In Everglow
"Beautiful" (with B Jones)	2024	—	—	—	—	—	—	—	—	—	—		Hiroquest 3: Paragon
"My Life" (with David Guetta, Swae Lee and PnB Rock)	2025	—	25	—	—	—	—	—	—	—	—		Hiroquest 3: Paragon
"Radio" (with Trippie Redd, Jessica Baio and KABU)	2025	—	—	—	—	—	—	—	—	—	—		Hiroquest 3: Paragon
"Rio Amazing" (with Ludmilla)	2025	—	—	—	—	—	—	—	—	—	—		Hiroquest 3: Paragon
"1-11" (with Öwnboss)	2025	—	—	—	—	—	—	—	—	—	—		Hiroquest 3: Paragon
"Forget Tonight" (with Tyler Hubbard)	2025	—	18	—	—	—	—	—	—	—	—		Hiroquest 3: Paragon
"Legacy"	2025	—	—	—	—	—	—	—	—	—	—		Non-album singles
"Stewpid" (with Gabry Ponte)	2025	—	—	—	—	—	—	—	—	—	—		Non-album singles
"Get Down" (with Blasterjaxx)	2025	—	—	—	—	—	—	—	—	—	—		Non-album singles
"Freak On"	2026	—	—	—	—	—	—	—	—	—	—		Non-album singles
"Yapaque" (with Farruko and Greeicy)	2026	—	15	—	—	—	—	—	—	—	—		Non-album singles
"—" denotes a recording that did not chart or was not released in that territory.

=== As featured artist ===
List of singles as featured artist, with selected chart positions, showing year released and album name
Title	Year	Peak chart positions							Album
Title	Year	US Dance Air.	AUS	AUS Dance	BEL (FL)	NLD	UK	UK Dance	Album
"Warp 1.9" (The Bloody Beetroots featuring Steve Aoki)	2009	—	51	10	— (Note: "Warp 1.9" did not enter the Flanders Ultratop 50, but peaked at number 23 on the Ultratip chart.)	—	—	—	Romborama
"New Noise" (The Bloody Beetroots featuring Steve Aoki and Refused)	2010	—	—	—	—	—	—	—	Non-album single
"We're All No One" (Nervo featuring Afrojack and Steve Aoki)	2011	15	—	—	— (Note: "We're All No One" did not enter the Flanders Ultratop 50, but peaked at number 56 on the Ultratip chart.)	89	135	27	Collateral
"Muñecas" (Note: "Muñecas" is also included on Steve Aoki's eighth studio album Hiroquest 2: Double Helix.) (Tini featuring La Joaqui and Steve Aoki)	2023	—	—	—	—	—	—	—	Cupido
"—" denotes a recording that did not chart or was not released in that territory.

== Other charted songs ==
List of songs, with selected chart positions, showing year released and album name
Title	Year	Peak chart positions						Album
Title	Year	US Dance	AUS	CAN	FRA	JPN	KOR	Album
"Back to Earth" (featuring Fall Out Boy)	2014	— (Note: "Back to Earth" did not enter the Hot Dance/Electronic Songs chart, but peaked at number 38 on the Dance/Electronic Digital Song Sales chart.)	—	— (Note: "Back to Earth" did not enter the Billboard Canadian Hot 100, but peaked at number 60 on the Hot Canadian Digital Song Sales chart.)	—	85	—	Neon Future I
"Home We'll Go (Take My Hand)" (featuring Walk off the Earth)	2015	—	—	62	—	—	—	Neon Future II & Sing It All Away
"The Truth Untold" (BTS featuring Steve Aoki)	2018	—	100	—	90	—	2	Love Yourself: Tear
"Why Are We So Broken" (featuring blink-182)	2018	36	—	—	—	—	—	Neon Future III
"—" denotes a recording that did not chart or was not released in that territory.

== Guest appearances ==
List of non-single guest appearances, with other performing artists, showing year released and album name
Year	Title	Other artist(s)	Album
2008	"1967 Poem"	Junkie XL	Booming Back at You
2009	"Warp 7.7"	The Bloody Beetroots	Romborama
2009	"Warp 1977"	The Bloody Beetroots, Bobermann	Christmas Vendetta Spares of Romborama
2011	"Misfits"	Travis Barker	Give the Drummer Some
2011	"Codebreaker"	Atari Teenage Riot	Is This Hyperreal?
2013	"Steve French"	Flux Pavilion	Freeway
2016	"Fight"	Various Artists	The Angry Birds Movie: Original Motion Picture Soundtrack
2017	"Smoke My Dope"	Lil Uzi Vert	Bright: The Album
2018	"The Truth Untold (전하지 못한 진심)"	BTS	Love Yourself: Tear
2018	"Motto"	David Guetta, Lil Uzi Vert, G-Eazy, Mally Mall	7
2018	"How Long"	Tom Morello and Tim McIlrath	The Atlas Underground
2018	"Lonely"	Alan Walker, Isák, Omar Noir	Different World
2019	"Play It Cool"	Monsta X	Take.2 We Are Here
2022	"Burrow"	Kid Cudi, Don Toliver, Dot da Genius	Entergalactic
2024	"I Just Wanna Get"	Kid Cudi, Layzie Bone, Krayzie Bone	Insano: Nitro Mega

== Remixes ==
Incomplete list of remixes, showing original artist(s)
Title	Original artists
"Dancing Machine" (Steve Aoki Remix)	The Jackson 5
"Gladiator" (Steve Aoki and DJ AM Remix)	Autoerotique
"Gifted" (Steve Aoki Remix)	NASA (featuring Kanye West, Lykke Li and Santigold)
"Part of Me" (Steve Aoki Remix)	Chris Cornell
"She Loves Everybody" (Steve Aoki Remix)	Chester French
"Spaceman" (Steve Aoki and The Bloody Beetroots Remix)	The Killers
"Rise" (Steve Aoki Remix)	Fact
"The Wind Blows" (Steve Aoki Remix)	All American Rejects
"Misery" (Steve Aoki Remix)	Good Charlotte
"Pets Dance" (Steve Aoki Remix)	S.P.A.
"Dancin' Til Dawn" (Steve Aoki Remix)	Lenny Kravitz
"Magic" (Steve Aoki Remix)	Robin Thicke
"Skin Divers" (Steve Aoki Remix)	Duran Duran (featuring Timbaland)
"Forever" (Steve Aoki Remix)	Drake (featuring Kanye West, Lil Wayne and Eminem)
"(If You're Wondering If I Want You To) I Want You To" (Steve Aoki Remix)	Weezer
"Echoes" (Steve Aoki Remix)	Klaxons
"Red Step" (Steve Aoki Remix)	Bassnectar
"Mr. Taxi" (Steve Aoki Remix)	Girls' Generation
"Looks Like Sex" (Steve Aoki Remix)	Mike Posner
"Government Hooker" (Steve Aoki Remix)	Lady Gaga
"What You Need" (Steve Aoki Remix)	Tiga
"Kill the F* DJ" (Steve Aoki Remix)	Army of the Universe
"No Stopping Us" (Steve Aoki Remix)	Dirtyphonics (featuring Foreign Beggars)
"Pursuit of Happiness" (Steve Aoki Remix)	Kid Cudi (featuring MGMT and Ratatat)
"Push 'Em" (Steve Aoki and Travis Barker Remix)	Travis Barker and Yelawolf
"Get Ready" (Steve Aoki Remix)	2 Unlimited
"Celebrate" (Steve Aoki Remix)	Empire Of The Sun
"Last Year" (Steve Aoki Mainstage Remix)	Borgore
"Kanye" (Steve Aoki and Twoloud Remix)	The Chainsmokers (featuring sirenXX)
"Dangerous" (Steve Aoki Remix)	David Guetta (featuring Sam Martin)
"Grindhouse" (Steve Aoki Remix)	Botnek
"Neon Future" (Steve Aoki 2045 Remix)	Steve Aoki
"La Prisión" (Steve Aoki Remix)	Maná
"The Shape" (Steve Aoki Edit)	Florian Picasso
"D2B" (Steve Aoki Remix)	Max Styler (with Charlie Darker)
"El Sonidito" (Steve Aoki and Reid Stefan Dia De Los Muertos Remix)	Hechizeros Banda
"Punch-Out" (Steve Aoki Remix)	Minor Circuit
"Drop It Down Low" (Steve Aoki Edit)	Henry Fong (featuring Richie Loop)
"Back 2 U" (Steve Aoki and Bad Royale Remix)	Steve Aoki (with Boehm featuring Walk the Moon)
"Spoonman" (Steve Aoki Remix)	Soundgarden
"Bored to Death" (Steve Aoki Remix)	Blink-182
"Welcome to the Black Parade" (Steve Aoki 10th Anniversary Remix)	My Chemical Romance
"Hey Baby" (Steve Aoki Remix)	Dimitri Vegas & Like Mike (vs. Diplo featuring Deb's Daughter)
"UTAI IV: Reawakening" (Steve Aoki Remix)	Kenji Kawai
"The Best" (Steve Aoki Remix)	Mangchi
"Rolex" (Steve Aoki Remix)	Ayo & Teo
"Thriller" (Steve Aoki Midnight Hour Remix)	Michael Jackson
"Mi Gente" (Steve Aoki Remix)	J Balvin and Willy William
"One More Light" (Steve Aoki Chester Forever Remix)	Linkin Park
"MIC Drop" (Steve Aoki Remix)	BTS
"What the Funk" (Steve Aoki Remix)	Oliver Heldens (featuring Danny Shah)
"All Falls Down" (Steve Aoki Remix)	Alan Walker (featuring Noah Cyrus and Digital Farm Animals)
"Shine Good" (Steve Aoki Remix)	Garmiani (featuring Julimar Santos)
"Night Call" (MAKJ and Steve Aoki Remix)	Steve Aoki (featuring Lil Yachty and Migos)
"All Night" (Steve Aoki Remix)	Steve Aoki (with Lauren Jauregui)
"Sober Up" (Steve Aoki Remix)	AJR
"Lonely" (Steve Aoki Remix)	Matoma (featuring MAX)
"Ashes" (Steve Aoki Deadpool Demix)	Celine Dion
"Girls" (Steve Aoki Remix)	Rita Ora (featuring Cardi B, Bebe Rexha and Charli XCX)
"Pop It Off" (Steve Aoki Remix)	Henry Fong and Vlien Boy (featuring Lisa Mercedez)
"Pretender" (Steve Aoki and Max Styler Remix)	Steve Aoki (featuring Lil Yachty and AJR)
"Me On You" (Steve Aoki Vibes Are Everything Remix)	Nicky Romero and Taio Cruz
"Me On You" (Steve Aoki Double Time Fun Time Remix)	Nicky Romero and Taio Cruz
"Feeling of Falling" (Steve Aoki Remix)	Cheat Codes and Kim Petras
"Waste It on Me (Steve Aoki The Bold Tender Sneeze Remix)	Steve Aoki (featuring BTS)
"Why Are We So Broken" (Steve Aoki Bottles of Beer on the Wall Remix)	Steve Aoki (featuring Blink-182)
"Are You Lonely" (Steve Aoki Remix)	Steve Aoki with Alan Walker (featuring Isák)
"Warp 2.019" (Steve Aoki and Kayzo Remix)	The Bloody Beetroots
"Beyond the Game" (Steve Aoki Remix)	WCG Inc
"The Digital" (Steve Aoki Remix)	Elephant Heart
"Big Boi" (Steve Aoki Remix)	Big Boi and Sleepy Brown (featuring CeeLo Green)
"The Way I Are" (Steve Aoki Pimpin Remix)	Timbaland (featuring Keri Hilson and D.O.E. and Sebastian)
"Flames" (Steve Aoki Remix)	R3hab, Zayn and Jungleboi
"Maldad" (Steve Aoki's "Que Más" Remix)	Steve Aoki and Maluma
"Mr. Navigator" (Steve Aoki's 'I Am The Captain Now' Remix)	Armin van Buuren and Tempo Giusto
"Ninja Re Bang Bang" (Steve Aoki Remix)	Kyary Pamyu Pamyu
"Lies" (VIP Mix)	Steve Aoki and Kream
"Banned From the Roxy" (Steve Aoki's Basement Tapes Remix)	Crass
"Fav Boyz" (Steve Aoki's Gold Star Remix)	A.C.E (featuring Thutmose)
"Ryu's Theme" (The Moe's Steve Aoki Remix)	Capcom Sound Team
"Not Tonight" (Tomorrow Sounds Good Steve Aoki Remix)	JJ Lin
"Adrenalina" (Steve Aoki Remix)	Senhit and Flo Rida
"No Beef" (Steve Aoki's 11 Years Later Remix)	Afrojack and Steve Aoki (featuring Miss Palmer)
"Nxde" (Steve Aoki Remix)	(G)I-dle
"Paranoia" (Steve Aoki and Stephen Hurtley Remix)	Steve Aoki and Danna Paola
