= Laidback Luke discography =

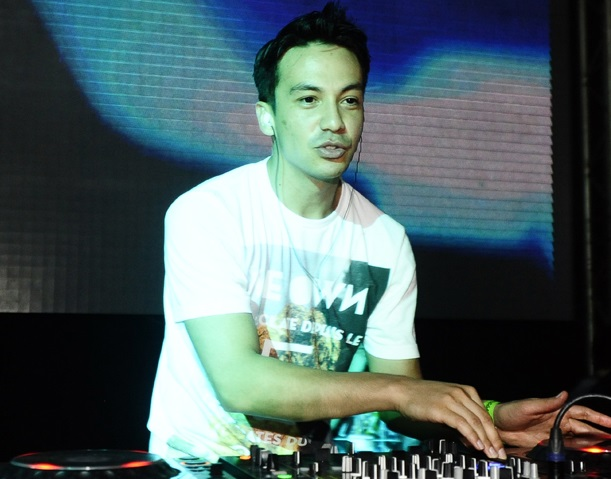
- Laidback Luke in August 2012

Laidback Luke is Filipino-born Dutch electronic musician.

== Studio albums ==
List of studio albums
Title	Album details
Electronic Satisfaction	Released: July 1, 2002; Label: United Recordings; Format: Digital download, CD
Focus	Released: November 6, 2015; Label: Mixmash Records; Format: CD, vinyl, digital download

== Extended plays ==
List of extended plays
Title	Album details
Mixmash E.P. Vol. 1	Released: May 31, 2004; Label: Mixmash; Formats: Digital download, CD
B2B	Released: March 20, 2020; Label: Mixmash; Formats: Digital download

== Compilation albums ==
List of compilation albums
Title	Album details
Psyched-Up (The Early Works '96-'98)	Released: November 30, 1999; Label: Touché; Format: Digital download

== Mix albums ==
List of mix albums
Title	Album details
Windmill Skill	Released: August 1, 2003; Label: United; Formats: CD, digital download

== Singles ==
=== As lead artist ===
List of singles as lead artist, with selected chart positions, showing year released and album name
Title	Year	Peak chart positions								Album
Title	Year	NLD	AUS	AUT	BEL	FRA	GER	IRE	UK	Album
"Rocking with the Best"	2000	92	—	—	—	—	—	—	—	Non-album singles
"Popmusic" (featuring Jay Underground)	2002	94	—	—	—	—	—	—	—	Non-album singles
"We Can Not Get Enough! (Dance Valley Theme 2003)" (featuring MC Marxman)	2003	5	—	—	—	—	—	—	—	Non-album singles
"More Than Special" (featuring Pimsmit)	2004	98	—	—	—	—	—	—	—	Non-album singles
"Get Dumb" (with Swedish House Mafia)	2007	45	—	—	—	—	—	—	—	Non-album singles
"It" (with Angello and Ingrosso)	2008	—	—	—	—	—	—	—	—	Non-album singles
"Chaa Chaa" (with Sebastian Ingrosso)	2008	—	—	—	—	—	—	—	—	Chaa Chaa EP
"Show Me Love" (with Steve Angello featuring Robin S.)	2008	—	—	64	—	25	93	25	11	Non-album singles
"Leave the World Behind" (with Swedish House Mafia featuring Deborah Cox)	2009	75	—	—	64	—	—	—	—	Non-album singles
"Blau!" (with Lee Mortimer)	2009	—	—	—	—	—	—	—	—	Blau! EP
"Step by Step" (with Gregor Salto featuring Mavis Acquah)	2010	65	—	—	—	—	—	—	—	Non-album single
"Till Tonight" (featuring Jonathan Mendelsohn)	2010	83	—	—	91	—	—	—	—	Till Tonight EP
"Timebomb" (featuring Jonathan Mendelsohn)	2010	—	—	—	—	—	—	—	—	Timebomb EP
"Turbulence" (with Steve Aoki featuring Lil Jon)	2011	—	37	—	—	—	—	—	66	Non-album single
"Natural Disaster" (vs. Example)	2011	—	92	—	99	—	—	—	37	Playing in the Shadows
"1234" (featuring Chuckie and Martin Solveig)	2012	—	—	—	—	—	—	—	—	Non-album singles
"We Are the Stars" (featuring Martell)	2012	—	—	—	—	—	—	—	—	Non-album singles
"Night Like This" (with Angger Dimas featuring Polina)	2012	—	—	—	—	—	—	—	—	Non-album singles
"Dynamo" (with Hardwell)	2013	—	—	—	—	—	—	—	—	Non-album singles
"More" (with Dimitri Vegas & Like Mike)	2013	—	—	—	—	—	—	—	—	Non-album singles
"Blow" (with Martin Solveig)	2013	—	—	—	80	—	—	—	—	Non-album singles
"Mufasa" (with Peking Duk)	2013	—	—	—	—	—	—	—	—	Non-album singles
"Collide" (with Project 46)	2014	—	—	—	—	—	—	—	—	Non-album singles
"Flashing Lights" (with D.O.D)	2014	—	—	—	—	—	—	—	—	Non-album singles
"We're Forever" (with Marc Benjamin featuring Nuthin' Under A Million)	2014	—	—	—	—	—	—	—	—	Non-album singles
"Bae" (featuring Gina Turner)	2014	—	—	—	107	—	—	—	—	Non-album singles
"Stepping to the Beat"	2014	—	—	—	—	—	—	—	—	Non-album singles
"Memories" (with Project 46)	2014	—	—	—	—	—	—	—	—	Non-album singles
"Go" (with Uberjak'd)	2014	—	—	—	—	—	—	—	—	Non-album singles
"S.a.x." (with Tujamo)	2015	—	—	—	48	—	—	—	—	Non-album singles
"Beat of the Drum" (with Angger Dimas featuring Mina)	2015	—	—	—	—	—	—	—	—	Non-album singles
"Outer Space (XXX)" (with Shelco Garcia and TEENWOLF featuring Kris Kiss)	2015	—	—	—	—	—	—	—	—	Non-album singles
"Snap That Neck" (with Chocolate Puma)	2015	—	—	—	—	—	—	—	—	Non-album singles
"Get It Right" (with Moska featuring Terri B!)	2015	—	—	—	—	—	—	—	—	Non-album singles
"Let It Go" (featuring Trevor Guthrie)	2015	—	—	—	—	—	—	—	—	Focus
"The Chase" (featuring Aruna)	2016	—	—	—	—	—	—	—	—	Focus
"Move To The Sound" (with Afrojack featuring Hawkboy)	2016	—	—	—	—	—	—	—	—	Non-album singles
"Front 2 The Back" (with Mike Cervello)	2016	—	—	—	—	—	—	—	—	Non-album singles
"Fcukin Beats" (with Twoloud)	2016	—	—	—	—	—	—	—	—	Non-album singles
"To The Beat" (with Yves V featuring Hawkboy)	2016	—	—	—	—	—	—	—	—	Non-album singles
"Promiscuous" (with Will Sparks featuring Alicia Madison)	2016	—	—	—	—	—	—	—	—	Non-album singles
"Mad Men" (with Kura)	2016	—	—	—	—	—	—	—	—	Non-album singles
"XOXO" (with Ralvero featuring INA)	2017	—	—	—	—	—	—	—	—	Non-album singles
"Paradise" (with Made In June featuring Bright Lights)	2017	—	—	—	—	—	—	—	—	Non-album singles
"With Me" (with Florian Picasso featuring Bright Lights)	2017	—	—	—	—	—	—	—	—	Non-album singles
"Like This" (with Konih)	2017	—	—	—	—	—	—	—	—	Non-album singles
"Rise" (with Mark Villa)	2017	—	—	—	—	—	—	—	—	Non-album singles
"It's Time" (with Steve Aoki featuring Bruce Buffer)	2018	—	—	—	—	—	—	—	—	5OKI
"Milkshake (Better Than Yours)" (with Ale Mora featuring Shermanology)	2018	—	—	—	—	—	—	—	—	Non-album singles
"We Are One" (with Jewelz & Sparks featuring Pearl Andersson)	2018	—	—	—	—	—	—	—	—	Non-album singles
"Oh Yes (Rockin' With The Best)" (with Keanu Silva)	2019	—	—	—	—	—	—	—	—	Non-album singles
"Party Starter" (with Mark Bale)	2019	—	—	—	—	—	—	—	—	Non-album singles
"Keep On Rockin'" (with Pyrodox)	2019	—	—	—	—	—	—	—	—	Non-album singles
"Bam Bam" (with Raven & Kreyn)	2019	—	—	—	—	—	—	—	—	Non-album singles
"Make That Thang Go" (with Unity)	2019	—	—	—	—	—	—	—	—	Non-album singles
"Can't Hold My Tongue" (featuring Sxmson)	2020	—	—	—	—	—	—	—	—	Non-album singles
"The Illest" (with Swanky Tunes)	2020	—	—	—	—	—	—	—	—	B2B EP
"Hot Sauce" (with Funky Craig)	2020	—	—	—	—	—	—	—	—	B2B EP
"Bass Test" (with Mark Bale)	2020	—	—	—	—	—	—	—	—	B2B EP
"We Found Love" (with Steff da Campo)	2020	—	—	—	—	—	—	—	—	Non-album singles
"U Don't" (with Domastic)	2020	—	—	—	—	—	—	—	—	Non-album singles
"Heart On My Sleeve" (with Gattüso featuring Sarah Reeves)	2020	—	—	—	—	—	—	—	—	Non-album singles
"Rolling Stone" (featuring David Goncalves)	2020	—	—	—	—	—	—	—	—	Non-album singles
"Dance It Off" (featuring Ally Brooke)	2020	—	—	—	—	—	—	—	—	Non-album singles
"Good Again" (featuring Shiah Maisel)	2021	—	—	—	—	—	—	—	—	Non-album singles
"If There is Love" (with Raphi)	2021	—	—	—	—	—	—	—	—	Non-album singles
"Kong" (with Carta)	2021	—	—	—	—	—	—	—	—	Non-album singles
"Over & Over" (with Rak-Su)	2021	—	—	—	—	—	—	—	—	Non-album singles
"Call It House" (with DJs from Mars)	2021	—	—	—	—	—	—	—	—	Non-album singles
"Home Alone" (with Lost Boy and Dubdogz)	2021	—	—	—	—	—	—	—	—	Non-album singles
"Never Alone" (with Gattüso)	2021	—	—	—	—	—	—	—	—	Non-album singles
"Brand New" (with Teez)	2022	—	—	—	—	—	—	—	—	Non-album singles
"All I Own" (with Mutya Buena)	2023	—	—	—	—	—	—	—	—	Non-album singles
"—" denotes a recording that did not chart or was not released in that territory.

== Remixes ==
1996

- Green Velvet – The Stalker (LBL Remix)

1998

- Lambda – Hold on Tight (LBL Remix)
- DJ Hyperactive – Wide Open (LBL Remix)

2000

- Jark Prongo - Rocket Base (LBL Remix)
- L.S.G. - Quick Star (Laidback Luke's Housetechmania Remix)

2003

- Daft Punk – Crescendolls (LBL Remix)
- Patrick Alavi – To Be (LBL Remix)

2004

- Steve Angello – Voices (LBL Remix)

2005

- MYPD – You're Not Alone (LBL Remix)

2006

- Hardrox – Feel the Hard Rock (LBL Remix)
- Another Chance – The Sound of Eden (LBL Remix)

2007

- TV Rock and Dukes of Windsor – The Others (LBL Remix)
- DJ DLG and Laidback Luke – Ambition (LBL Remix)
- David Guetta featuring Cozi – Baby When the Light (LBL Remix)
- Denis Naidanow – Ascension (LBL Remix)

2008

- Natalie Williams – U Don't Know (LBL Remix)
- Roger Sanchez – Again (LBL Remix)
- Paul Johnson – Get Get Down (LBL Remix)
- Juice String – Sex Weed (LBL Remix)
- David Guetta featuring Tara McDonald – Delirious (LBL Remix)
- TV Rock featuring Rudy – Been a Long Time (LBL Remix)
- Steve Angello – Gypsy (LBL Remix)
- The Black Ghosts – Repetition Kills You (LBL Remix)
- Martin Solveig – I Want You (LBL Remix)
- Roger Sanchez featuring Terri B – Bang That Box (LBL Remix)
- Joachim Garraud – Are U Ready (LBL Remix)
- Chromeo – Fancy Footwork (LBL Remix)
- Tocadisco – Streetgirls (LBL Remix)
- Surkin – White Knight Two (LBL Remix)
- Daft Punk – Teachers (LBL Rework)
- Dada Life – Rubber Band Boogie (LBL Remix)
- Ray Parker Jr. – Ghostbusters Theme (LBL Remix)
- Michael Jackson - Thriller (Laidback Luke Remix)
- Daft Punk - Teachers (Laidback Luke's 2008 Rework)

2009

- David Guetta featuring Kelly Rowland – When Love Takes Over (LBL Remix)
- Tiësto – I Will Be Here (LBL Remix)
- Mstrkrft featuring John Legend – Heartbreaker (LBL Remix)
- Junior Sanchez featuring Good Charlotte – Elevator (LBL Remix)
- Avicii – Ryu (LBL Edit)
- The Black Eyed Peas – I Gotta Feeling (LBL Remix)
- Dizzee Rascal featuring Chrome – Holiday (LBL Remix)
- Martin Solveig featuring Dragonette – Boys & Girls (LBL Remix)
- Sandro Silva – Prom Night (LBL Remix)
- Depeche Mode – Fragile Tension (LBL Remix)
- Robbie Rivera – Rock the Disco (LBL Edit)
- Calvin Harris – You Used to Hold Me (LBL Remix)
- Korgis – Need Your Lovin' (Laidback Luke Remix)

2010

- Tiësto - Flight 643 (Laidback Luke 2010 Rework)
- Wynter Gordon – Dirty Talk (Laidback Luke Remix)
- Moby – Wait For Me (Laidback Luke Remix)
- Christina Aguilera – Not Myself Tonight (Laidback Luke Remix)
- Carte Blanche featuring Kid Sister – Do! Do! Do! (Laidback Luke Remix)
- Bad Boy Bill featuring Eric Jag – Got That Feeling (Laidback Luke Remix)
- Lil Jon featuring Kee – Give It All You Got (Laidback Luke Remix)
- iSquare – Hey Sexy Lady (Laidback Luke Remix)
- Kissy Sell Out - Garden Friends (Laidback Luke Remix)

2011

- Benny Benassi featuring Gary Go – Cinema (Laidback Luke Remix)
- Alice Deejay – Better Off Alone (Laidback Luke Remix)
- Jump Jump Dance Dance – 2.0 (Laidback Luke Remix)
- Laura LaRue – Un, Deux, Trois (Laidback Luke Remix)
- Chris Lake - Sundown (Laidback Luke Remix)
- Skream featuring Sam Frank – Where You Should Be (Laidback Luke Remix)
- Anjulie – Brand New Bitch (Laidback Luke Remix)
- GTA featuring Zashanell – U & I (Laidback Luke Remix)
- Chris Brown featuring Benny Benassi – Beautiful People (Laidback Luke Edit)
- Patric La Funk – Time And Time Again (Laidback Luke Edit)
- Pitbull featuring Marc Anthony – Rain Over Me (Laidback Luke Remix)
- David Guetta featuring Nicki Minaj – Turn Me On (David Guetta and Laidback Luke Remix)

2012

- Aaron Smith featuring Luvli – Dancin' (Laidback Luke Remix)
- Madonna featuring Nicki Minaj and M.I.A. – Give Me All Your Luvin’ (Laidback Luke Remix)
- Felix Cartal featuring Polina – Don't Turn On the Lights (Laidback Luke Remix)
- Rita Ora - How We Do (Laidback Luke Remix)
- Congorock - Ivory (Laidback Luke Edit)
- Mariah Carey - Triumphant (Laidback Luke Dub)
- Sato Goldschlag featuring Wynter Gordon - Hey Mr. Mister (Laidback Luke Remix)
- Dragonette - Let It Go (Laidback Luke Remix)
- Sub Focus featuring Alice Gold - Out The Blue (Laidback Luke Remix)
- Tiësto and Mark Knight featuring Dino - Beautiful World (Laidback Luke Remix)
- Kerli - Zero Gravity (Laidback Luke Remix)
- Savoy and Heather Bright - We Are The Sun (Laidback Luke Remix)
- Martel - Ricochet (Laidback Luke Remix)
- Karmin - Hello (Laidback Luke Remix)
- Chuckie and Junxterjack - Make Some Noise (Laidback Luke Remix)
- Austin Leeds featuring Jason Caesar - Close Your Eyes (Laidback Luke Remix)
- Yolanda Be Cool featuring Arama Mara - Before Midnight (Laidback Luke Remix)

2013

- Wallpaper. - Good 4 It (Laidback Luke Goes Melbourne Remix)
- Robin Thicke featuring T.I. and Pharrell - Blurred Lines (Laidback Luke Remix)
- Donna Summer - MacArthur Park (Laidback Luke Remix)
- Calvin Harris featuring Ayah Marar - Thinking About You (Laidback Luke Remix)

2014

- Alex Metric - Heart Weighs A Ton featuring Stefan Storm (Laidback Luke 'Jack' Remix)

2015

- Kryoman - Loaded (Laidback Luke Remix)
- Jack Eye Jones - Story (Laidback Luke Remix)

2016

- Timmy Trumpet - Mantra (Laidback Luke Edit)
- Max Vangeli and De Kibo - Feel The Music (Laidback Luke Remix)

2018

- Kura - Lambo (Laidback Luke Remix)
- Tiësto and Dzeko featuring Preme and Post Malone - Jackie Chan (Laidback Luke Remix)
- Afrojack featuring Mightyfools - Keep It Low (Laidback Luke Remix)
- Armin van Buuren featuring Conrad Sewell - Sex, Love & Water (Laidback Luke Remix)

2019

- De Jeugd van Tegenwoordig - Let The Tits Out (Laidback Luke Remix)
- Calvin Harris and Rag'n'Bone Man - Giant (Laidback Luke Remix)
- Avicii - SOS (Laidback Luke Tribute Remix)
- Afrojack and Jewelz & Sparks featuring Emmalyn - Switch (Laidback Luke Remix)
- Deorro, Henry Fong and Elvis Crespo - Pica (Laidback Luke Remix)
- Knife Party featuring Harrison - Death & Desire (Laidback Luke Remix)

2021

- Illenium and Nurko featuring Valerie Broussard - Sideways (Laidback Luke Remix)
- Laidback Luke and Rak-Su - Over & Over (VIP Mix)
