= Miss Palmer =

Miss Palmer can refer to:

- Stage name of Alyssa Palmer, featured artist on "No Beef"
- Miss Palmer, the nurse of the Happy Dale Mental Hospital in Runaway: A Twist of Fate
