= Josh Stevens =

American singer (born 1983)

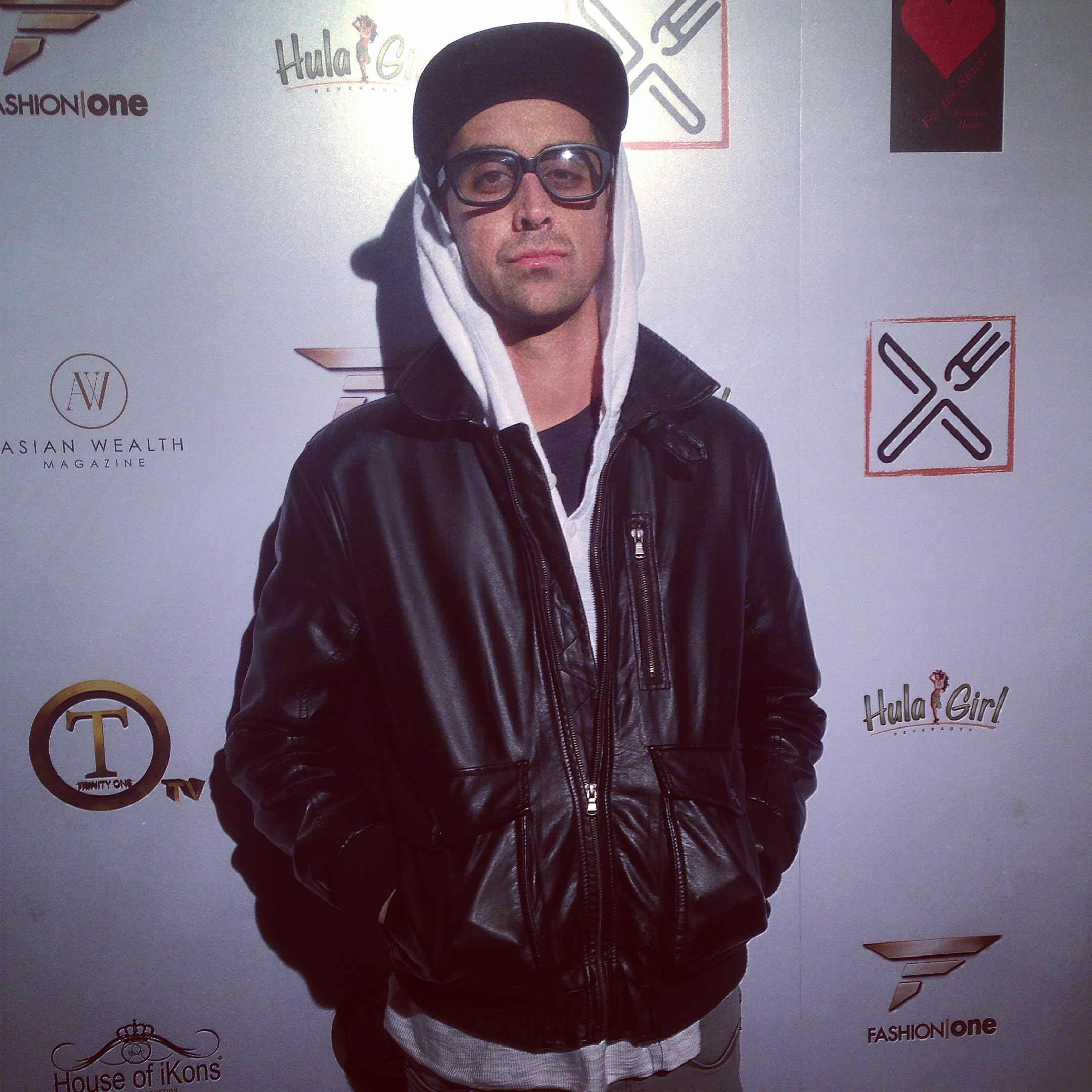
- Josh Stevens on the red carpet at Fashion One Show in Hollywood Ca 2015

Background information
- Born: Joshua Steven Gill; Fountain Valley, California, United States
- Origin: Los Angeles
- Genre: hip hop dance pop indie-rock
- Occupations: record producer, songwriter, singer, engineer, musician, A&R, CEO
- Years active: 1999–present
- Labels: Stadium Music Enterprise, Interscope Records, Island Def Jam Records, Universal Music Group, Epic Records
- Website: iamjoshstevens.com

Josh Stevens (born Joshua Steven Gill; November 21, 1983) is an American singer, record producer, songwriter, audio engineer and music executive, located in Los Angeles. His works are Grammy Award winning, Emmy Award Winning, RIAA Platinum certified, Billboard Award nominated, Juno Award nominated, ARIA Music Awards Platinum certified and he is a twice Superior Hit Product Award winner.

== Early life and education ==
In 2004, Stevens attended the Los Angeles Recording School (now Los Angeles Film School) where he received a certificate of engineering.

== Music career ==
=== Early career ===
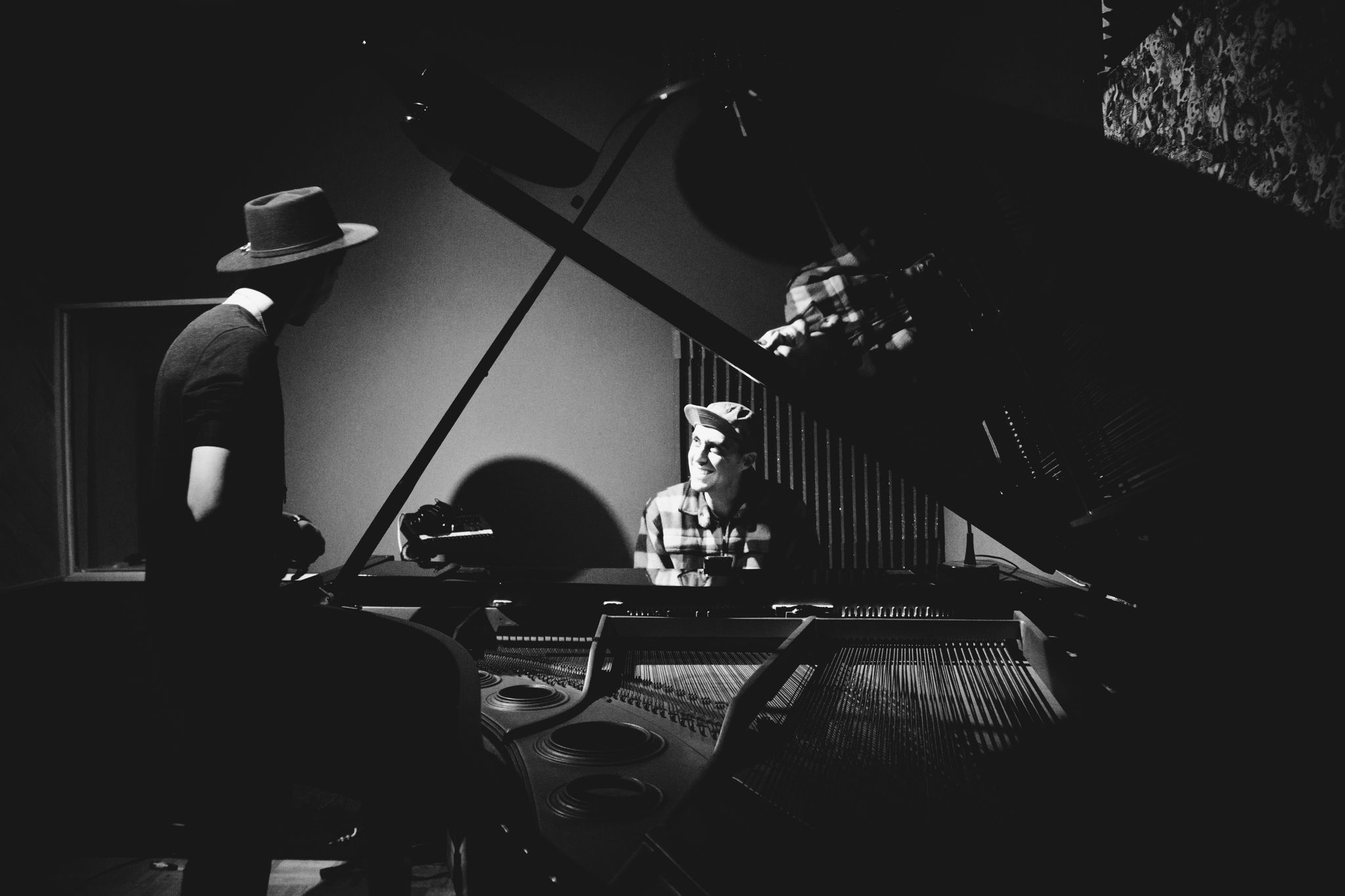
Josh Stevens and Spencer Ludwig of Capital Cities writing at Studio City Sound, Ca 2015

After graduating Stevens became an intern under Tom Weir at Studio City Sound. This is where he meet long time record executive, co-collaborator and current manager, Byron Martinez. At about the same time, he also became an intern for Niko Bolas.

After spending about two years as an intern, Stevens found a live sound mix engineer position at Rick Warren's Saddleback Church. He spent just under two years as a head Tech Director. Wanting to get back into more studio work, he was asked to be a personal engineer for Warren G, who would later be instrumental in Stevens working with LMFAO.

=== 2004-2008: Mental Advisory ===
Stevens started his career by writing and free-style rapping in his first hiphop group, Mental Advisory, where he went by the stage name Speratic. With his two brothers, Jason Whittaker (aka Blaximus) and Jay Daniels (aka M.A.R.S.), Stevens mainly did vocals and Whittaker created most of the production and music.

Mental Advisory released two albums:

- Only The Few (2004)
- Come Join The Circus – Speratic (solo album) (2008)

One of Mental Advisory's tracks became entrance music for comedian Mark Curry's live set.

After the band members went on to do other ventures, Whittaker became a comedian and is now known as Jay Whittaker. Daniels became DJ Jason Craig. After officially ending Mental Advisory, the members continued to make music with each other.

=== 2010-2011: LMFAO ===
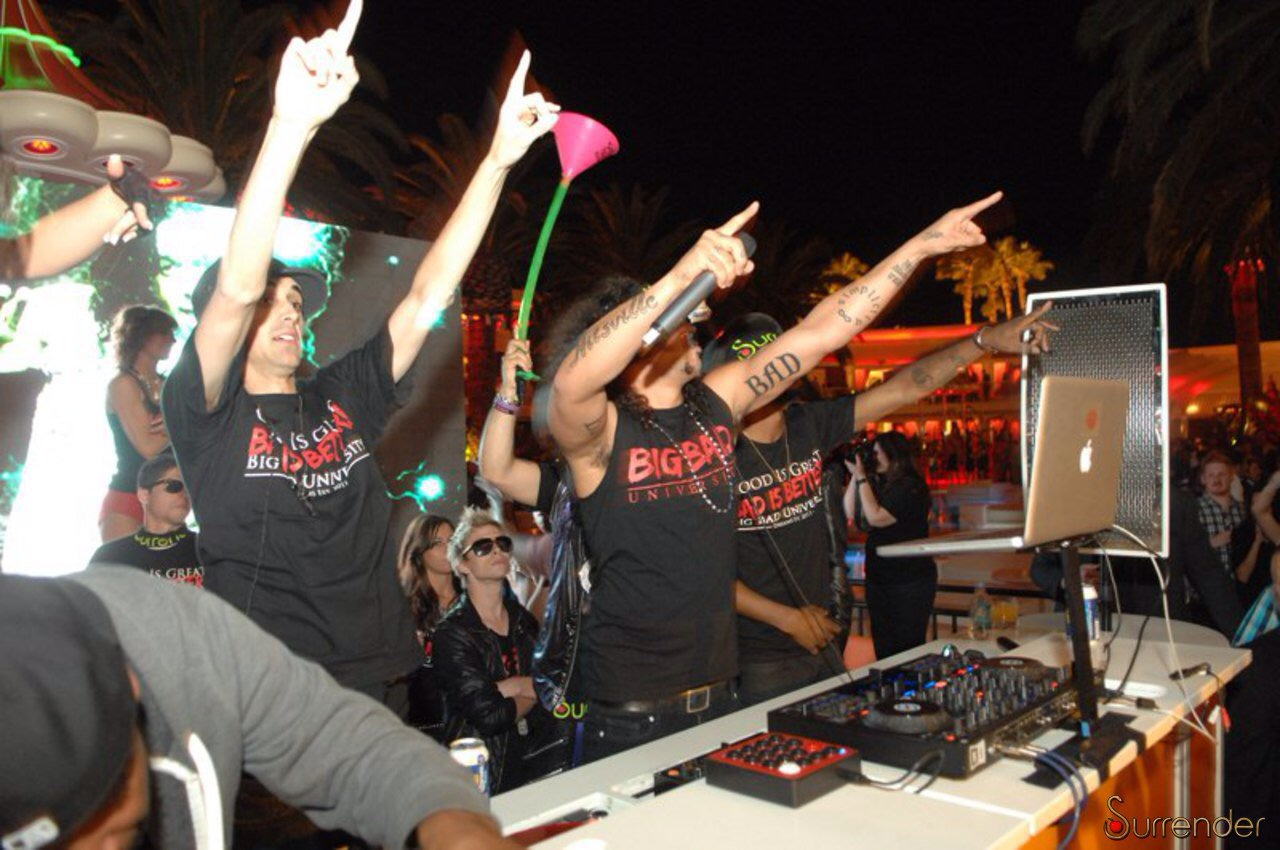
Josh Stevens & Skyler Gordy of LMFAO performing Party Rock Anthem at Surrender Night Club, Wynn Hotel in Las Vegas 2011

Stevens co-wrote, engineered and toured on LMFAO's 2010 sophomore album Sorry for Party Rocking. They released the full album on June 17, 2011 in the US. It was certified Gold in early 2012, and in 2013 was near Platinum. The album's first single was "Party Rock Anthem" which spent six consecutive week on the US Billboard Top 100 at No.1; and the video, which Stevens can be seen shuffling in, (as of January 2019) had over 1.7 billion views. Billboard posted it at No.2 for the biggest song of the 2010 decade. The song also peaked at No.1 in Canada, the UK Singles Chart, and in over ten other countries.

The second single was "Champagne Showers", for which Stevens was the recording engineer, features English singer-songwriter Natalia Kills. The song was performed on American Idol in April 2012.

The third single was "Sexy and I Know It", although Stevens was only publicy accredited as writing the remix version (MADEin82 Remix). This reached No.1 on the iTunes charts worldwide and No.1 on the Australian and Canadian Hot 100. It also reached No. 5 in UK, plus No.1 in Canada, Denmark, Ireland, Austria, Japan and New Zealand; and hit No.1 on both Billboard R&B chart and the Billboard Hot 100.

The songs Stevens had the biggest influences on for the album were co-writing and engineering "Reminds Me of You" (featuring Calvin Harris) and "With You".

Aside from writing and engineering for LMFAO's album, he also toured with them in 2011 as one of their DJs.

=== 2011: Pitbull ===
On June 17, 2011, Stevens engineered Pitbull's "Took My Love" (featuring RedFoo, Vein & David Rush) produced by Redfoo for Pitbull's sixth studio album, Planet Pit. The album debuted at No. 7 on the Billboard 200. It reached US (RIAA) Platinum and charted in the top 10 in over 10 countries.

=== 2012: Steve Aoki, Young Jeezy, Jennifer Lopez ===
Stevens co-wrote and engineered the song "Livin' My Love" featuring LMFAO and Nervo for Steve Aoki's January 10, 2012 album release, Wonderland.

On February 21, 2012, Stevens engineered "Leave You Alone" by Young Jeezy featuring Ne-Yo and produced by Warren G. The song was RIAA platinum certified in October 2020.

On June 8, 2012, Stevens engineered and A&R (consulted) Jennifer Lopez's single "Goin' In", featuring Flo Rida and Lil Jon. It was produced by Jamahl "GoonRock" Listenbee and released by Island Def Jam Records. The single reached No. 1 on US Billboard Dance Chart and the album which was released July 17, 2012 by Epic Records.

=== 2013: Eminem and Rihanna (unaccredited) ===
In September 2013, while working as a consultant and writer for Interscope Records, Stevens was commissioned to submit songs for Eminem's The Marshall Mathers LP 2. This resulted in Eminem's "The Monster" ft Rihanna mixed by Dr. Dre and bearing a striking resemblance to one of Stevens' requested songs.

=== 2019: Sapporo, "Somewhere" ===
In 2019, Stevens was asked to sing and write the music for the worldwide commercial campaign of Sapporo beer's new product Chu-Hi 99.99. The campaign resulted in 12 national TV commercial advertisements and giving him the title "The Voice of Sapporo 99.99". As of December 2019, Chu-Hi 99.99 is a twice Superior Hit Product Award Winner and has sold over 48,000,000 units with revenue of $72,000,000.

Stevens was on a world tour in support of his radio single "Somewhere", with 2019 tour stops in Japan and US.

=== 2021: LS+B ===
Josh is the lead singer and co-executive producer of the super group LS+B alongside Grammy Winning Music Producer/Artist Shafiq Husayn & Emmy Winning Composer Ikuma Matsuda.

On 15 September 2021, LS+B released Residency VIBE - Season 1. The lead single is "Mercy" featuring Jimetta Rose & Reuben Alexander and debuted on Mi-Soul Radio in London on 20 September 2021. The album was nominated for a Grammy and considered for the 2022 Recording Academy Song of the Year and Progressive R&B Album of the Year.

== Film and Television Credits ==
=== Lizzo's Watch Out For the Big Grrls ===
In 2022, Stevens contributed as a composer, co-writer and producer of Anna Storm’s “Confident,” which was featured in the Prime Video series Lizzo’s Watch Out for the Big Grrrls. The series received six Emmy nominations and won three awards, including Outstanding Competition Program, and also won the Critics Choice Real TV Award for Best Competition Series: Talent/Variety.

=== United Airlines Commercial Campaign ===
I'm 2023, Stevens contributed sound design and composition to United Airlines’ “United Juneteenth” commercial. The commercial won a Bronze Telly Award in 2023 in the Branded Content — General: Diversity & Inclusion category.

== Charitable work ==
=== City of Mission Viejo Walk Against Drugs rally ===
On October 21, 2017 Josh was the special Keynote Speaker for the City of Mission Viejo's annual Walk Against Drugs. The rally drew more than 4,000 attendees and is considered to be the cities highest acknowledgment from the city to civilian. It is their version of other cities Key to the City Award. The keynote was introduced by then Major Wendy Bucknum

== Podcast ==
=== It Is What It Is ===
It Is What It Is is a daily sports podcast featuring Harlem rappers Cam’ron and Ma$e, with Treasure “Stat Baby” Wilson serving as moderator. The show blends spirited “barbershop-style” banter with candid, often humorous, analysis of current NBA and NFL stories, cultural topics, and celebrity guests.The podcast typically runs about an hour per episode. Since launching in early 2023, it has filmed in Las Vegas, featured athlete guests, and received an eight‑figure deal with Underdog Fantasy. It has around 300,000 viewers per episode.

Stevens contributed as an audio producer and engineer for Seasons 3 and 4 of It Is What It Is. His work earned a Webby Award nomination in the “Sports Podcast” category.

== Discography ==
- John Mayer – "Route 66" for Cars" (album) (2006) ^{[e]}
- Robin Ford – "Truth" (album) (2006) ^{[e]}
- Fabulous – "Mixtape" (single) (2006)^{[a]}
- Philip Bardowell – "Fall to Rise" (album) (2007) ^{[a]} ^{[b]}
- Eric Lige – "Surrender" (album) (2008)^{[a]}^{[b]}^{[c]}
- Speratic – "Come Join The Circus" (album) (2008)^{[a]}^{[b]}^{[c]}^{[f]}
- LMFAO – "Sorry For Party Rocking" (album) (2011) ^{[a]} ^{[c]}
- Gucci Mane – "Crush on You" (single) (2011) ^{[a]}
- Lil Jon – "Drink" (single) (2011) ^{[a]} ^{[c]}
- Shwayze and Cisco Adler – "Drunk off Your Love" ft Sky Blu (single) (2011) ^{[a]} ^{[c]}
- W.E.E.D (Shwayze, Sky Blu, Mark Rosas) – "Scrooge McDuck" (single) (2011) ^{[a]} ^{[c]} ^{[d]}
- Markey ft Josh Stevens – "I Triumph" (single) (2011) ^{[c]} ^{[f]}
- Clyde Carson ft The Game (Pro by Scoop DeVille) – "Something to Speak About" (single) (2011) ^{[a]}
- Pitbull – "Planet Pit" (album) (2011) ^{[a]}
- Josh Stevens – "Far Off Fantasy" (single) (2011) ^{[a]} ^{[b]} ^{[c]} ^{[f]}
- Wiz Khalifa & Snoop Dogg – "Mac & Devin Go to High School (soundtrack)" (album) (2011) ^{[a]}
- Madonna - "Give Me All Your Luvin'" (Party Rock Remix) (featuring LMFAO and Nicki Minaj) (2012) ^{[a]}
- Steve Aoki – "Wonderland" (album) (2012) ^{[a]} ^{[c]}
- E40 – "What Happened to Them Days" (single) (2012) ^{[a]}
- Enur with Nicki Minaj and Goonrock – "I'm That Chick" (single) (2012) ^{[a]} ^{[c]}
- Jennifer Lopez ft Flo Rida and Lil Jon – "Goin' In" (single) (2012) ^{[a]} ^{[g]}
- Young Jeezy – "TM:103 Hustlerz Ambition" (album) (2012) ^{[a]}
- Josh Stevens ft Lisa D'Amato – "Brighter Day" (single) (2012) ^{[a]} ^{[b]} ^{[c]} ^{[f]}
- Josh Stevens – "Perfect Circle" (single) (2013) ^{[a]} ^{[b]} ^{[c]} ^{[f]}
- Demi Lovato, Wilmer Valderrama, Columbus Short "Voto Latino Presents The Enforcers" (score) – (2012)^{[d]}
- Warren G ft Nate Dogg and The Game – "Party We Will Throw" (single) (2012)^{[a]}
- Beenie Man ft Orisha Sound – "World War Three" (single) (2013) ^{[b]}^{[1]}
- Robin Thicke - "Blurred Lines" (Remix) (2013)^{[b]}
- Fergie - A Little Party Never Killed Nobody (All We Got) The Great Gatsby Soundtrack (2013) ^{[b]}^{[a]}
- Sky Blu (rapper) (LMFAO) ft Wilmer Valderrama, Sensato del Patio – "Salud" (single) (2013)^{[c]} ^{[d]}
- David Boyles LMFAO – Party Rock Anthem Dub (remake) (single) (2013) ^{[a]}
- Suby Cheng – "If You Believe (Song of China)" (single) (2014)^{[b]} ^{[d]} ^{[c]}^{[19]}
- Lisa D'Amato (America's Next Top Model Winner) – "Comfortably Dumb" (single) (2014)^{[a]} ^{[b]} ^{[c]}
- Loren Smith – "Break Free" (single) (2014)^{[a]} ^{[b]} ^{[g]}
- Naima Mora (America's Next Top Model Winner) – "Hour Glass" (single) (2014) ^{[b]} ^{[c]}
- Warren G ft Nate Dogg - "My House" (2015)^{[a]}
- Warren G ft E-40, Too Short & Nate Dogg - "Saturday" (2015)^{[a]}
- Josh Stevens ft Spencer Ludwig - "Hill Top" (2015)^{[f]}^{[d]}

Notes

- ^{^a} signifies audio engineer
- ^{^b} signifies music producer
- ^{^c} signifies songwriter
- ^{^d} signifies composer
- ^{^e} signifies assistant audio engineer or intern
- ^{^f} signifies singer
- ^{^g} signifies A&R/Consultant
