= Beat Down (song) =

Single by Steve Aoki and Angger Dimas featuring Iggy Azalea

from the album Wonderland (Remixed)
- Released: May 31, 2012 (US); August 26, 2012 (UK)
- Recorded: 2012
- Genre: Moombahton
- Length: 4:04
- Label: Dim Mak; Ultra (US); 3 Beat (UK)
- Songwriters: Steve Aoki, Angger Dimas, Iggy Azalea, Brandon Salaam Bailey
- Producers: Steve Aoki, Angger Dimas

Steve Aoki singles chronology
"Livin' My Love" (2012)	"Beat Down" (2012)	"Boneless" (2013)

Angger Dimas singles chronology
"Beat Down" (2012)

Iggy Azalea singles chronology
"Beat Down" (2012)	"Work" (2013)

"Beat Down" is a song by music producers Steve Aoki and Angger Dimas, featuring vocals from Australian rapper Iggy Azalea. The song was included on the re-release of Aoki's debut studio album, entitled Wonderland (Remixed), which was released on July 10, 2012.

== Background ==
Aoki released his long-awaited debut studio album, Wonderland, on January 10, 2012, featuring guest vocalists and musicians LMFAO, Kid Cudi, Kay, Travis Barker, will.i.am aka Zuper Blahq, Wynter Gordon, Rivers Cuomo, Lil Jon, Chiddy Bang, Lovefoxxx of CSS, Big John Duncan (former guitarist of the punk band The Exploited), and others, through his record label Dim Mak. A remix album was released shortly after, on July 10, 2012, Wonderland (Remixed), featuring a new original track that would become the lead single of the project, "Beat Down," with fellow Indonesian electronic producer/DJ Angger Dimas and also featured up-and-coming Australian rapper Iggy Azalea, who had been featured on the cover of hip-hop magazine XXL's buzzed-about annual "Top 10 Freshman List" and announced signing a deal with Southern rapper T.I.'s Grand Hustle Records.

== Critical reception ==
DJ Booth also praised it saying, "If you're a fan of EDM and a lover of 808s and snares, then you'll probably wear out the repeat button after listening to this single. Iggy does surprisingly well with the complex track as she professes that she's well versed in the art of the beat down with lyrics like, "It's a party on your face and I'm about to dance on it"," while Noisey drew comparisons to Major Lazer's 2009 single "Pon de Floor".

== Chart performance ==
The song only made it to number 44 on the UK Singles Chart, a comparative disappointment compared with Aoki's 2010 single "I'm in the House", featuring Zuper Blahq and his 2011 single "No Beef" featuring Afrojack and Alyssa Palma. "Beat Down" first entered the UK Dance Chart at number 21 and the UK Indie Chart at number 13 on June 2, 2012. It reappeared three months later with greater success peaking at number 44 in the UK Singles Chart and number 10 in the UK Dance Chart. A week later, it fell back down to number 22 in the UK Dance Chart.

== Live performances and other use ==
Aoki, Dimas and Azalea have included the track on their live shows setlists regularly since its release, including the rapper's 2014 The New Classic Tour. "Beat Down" was also featured on the 2015 romantic comedy film Trainwreck.

== Music video ==
The official music video, directed by Alex/2Tone of What You Steal productions, was released on July 19, 2012. Aoki, Azalea and Dimas all make appearances in the visuals.

== Track listing ==
Digital download
No.	Title	Length
1.	"Beat Down" (Original Mix)	4:04

Digital download – EP
No.	Title	Length
1.	"Beat Down" (Explicit Mix)	4:04
2.	"Beat Down" (Clean Mix)	4:04
3.	"Beat Down" (Donaeo mix)	4:42
4.	"Beat Down" (Devolution Remix)	5:35
5.	"Beat Down" (Paris Esquire AfroRnBeat Mix)	3:17

Digital download – Remixes
No.	Title	Length
1.	"Beat Down" (Afrojack Remix)	4:31
2.	"Beat Down" (Larry Tee & Attack Attack Attack)	4:17

== Charts ==
Chart (2012)	Peak Position
Belgium (Ultratip Bubbling Under Flanders)	59
Belgium Urban (Ultratop Flanders)	35
Belgium Dance Bubbling Under (Ultratop Flanders)	8
Netherlands (Single Top 100)	59
Scottish Singles Sales (Official Charts)	38
UK Dance (Official Charts)	10
UK Indie (Official Charts)	13
UK Singles (Official Charts)	44

== Release history ==
Version	Country	Date	Format	Label
Single	United States	May 31, 2012	Digital download	Ultra Records
EP	United Kingdom	August 26, 2012	Digital download	3 Beat Records
Remixes	United States	September 18, 2012	Digital download	Ultra Records
