= Jaleo (disambiguation) =

A jaleo is an Andalusian song genre, and clapping applause in flamenco.

Jaleo may also refer to:

- El Jaleo, an 1882 painting by John Singer Sargent
- Jaleos, a 1996 dance production by Víctor Ullate
- "Jaleo" (Ricky Martin song)
- "Jaleo" (Nicky Jam and Steve Aoki song)
