= Selecta (song) =

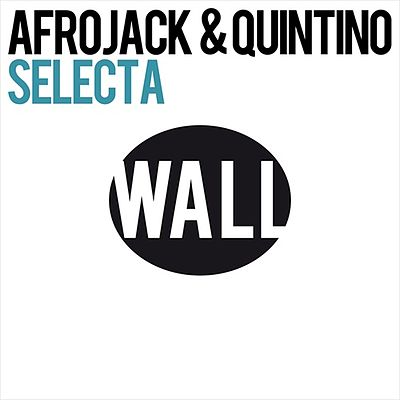

Single by Afrojack and Quintino
- Released: 2 May 2011
- Genre: Electro house
- Length: 5:47
- Label: Wall Recordings; Spinnin'
- Songwriter: Nick van de Wall
- Producers: Afrojack; Quintino

Afrojack singles chronology
"Give Me Everything" (2011)	"Selecta" (2011)	"No Beef" (2011)

"Selecta" is a song by Dutch music producers and DJs Afrojack and Quintino. The single was released digitally on 2 May 2011 in the Netherlands.

The song was included on Superclub Ibiza in 2011, a volume of the Cream, Pacha, Gatecrasher and Ministry of Sound compilation series known as Superclub.

== Track listing ==
Digital download
No.	Title	Length
1.	"Selecta" (Turn Up the Beach Theme)	2:43
2.	"Selecta" (Original Mix)	5:47

== Chart performance ==
Chart performance for "Selecta"
Chart (2011)	Peak position
Netherlands (Single Top 100)	74
Netherlands (Dutch Top 40)	37

== Release history ==
Release history and formats for "Selecta"
Country	Date	Format	Label
Netherlands	6 July 2011	Digital download	Wall Recordings / Spinnin'
