= Romborama =

Studio album by The Bloody Beetroots
- Released: 21 August 2009
- Genre: Electro, house, dance-punk, dubstep, new rave
- Length: 83:42
- Label: Dim Mak Records; Ministry of Sound Australia
- Producer: The Bloody Beetroots

The Bloody Beetroots chronology
| Cornelius EP (2008) | Romborama (2009) | Christmas Vendetta: Spares of Romborama (2009) |

Professional ratings
Review scores
| Source | Rating |
|---|---|
| AllMusic | 3.5/5 stars |
| Tiny Mix Tapes | 3/5 stars |

Romborama is the debut studio album by Italian electronic duo The Bloody Beetroots. It was released on August 21, 2009. Some tracks are taken from earlier Bloody Beetroots releases; for example, "Butter" can also be found on the Rombo EP.

The track "Warp 1.9" reached number 23 on the Triple J Hottest 100, 2009, the world's largest music poll. The track "Butter" was featured in a commercial for season 2 of MTV's Jersey Shore and in FIFA 09.

To date, Romborama has sold over 2,000,000 copies.

== Track listing ==
1. "Romborama" (featuring All Leather) – 3:43
2. "Have Mercy on Us" (and Cécile) – 5:48
3. "Storm" – 3:43
4. "Awesome" (featuring The Cool Kids) – 2:33
5. "Cornelius" – 4:13
6. "It's Better a DJ on 2 Turntables" – 3:48
7. "Talkin' in My Sleep" (featuring Lisa Kekaula) – 5:29
8. "Second Streets Have No Name" (featuring Beta Bow) – 3:04
9. "Butter" – 4:35
10. "WARP 1.9" (and Steve Aoki) – 3:23
11. "FFA 1985" (featuring Sky Ferreira) – 3:23
12. "Theolonius" (King Voodoo) (featuring Gazelle)- 4:51
13. "Yeyo" (and Raw Man) – 3:32
14. "Little Stars" (featuring Vicarious Bliss) – 2:42
15. "WARP 7.7" (and Steve Aoki) – 3:57
16. "Make Me Blank" (featuring J*Davey) – 3:52
17. "House No. 84" – 3:53
18. "Mother" – 3:38
19. "I Love the Bloody Beetroots" – 5:32
20. "Anacletus" – 3:17
21. "Come La" (featuring Marracash) (bonus track) – 2:42
22. "Little Stars" (featuring Vicarious Bliss (Instrumental)) (bonus track) – 2:41
- The song "It's Better a DJ on 2 Turntables" was secretly released unfinished under the alias of 'The Bollocks Brothers'.
