= We're All No One =

Single by Nervo featuring Afrojack and Steve Aoki

from the album Collateral
- Released: 2 September 2011
- Recorded: 2011
- Genre: Electro house
- Length: 3:36
- Label: Astralwerks
- Songwriter(s): Miriam Nervo; Olivia Nervo; Nick van de Wall; Steve Aoki
- Producer(s): Nervo; Afrojack; Steve Aoki

Nervo singles chronology
"The Way We See the World" (2011)	"We're All No One" (2011)	"Livin' My Love" (2012)

Afrojack singles chronology
"No Beef" (2011)	"We're All No One" (2011)	"I Like (The Remix)" (2012)

Steve Aoki singles chronology
"No Beef" (2011)	"We're All No One" (2011)	"Livin' My Love" (2012)

"We're All No One" is a song by Australian twin sisters Nervo featuring Dutch DJ and producer Afrojack and American DJ and producer Steve Aoki. The single was released digitally on 2 September 2011 in Australia and the United States and 16 December 2011 in Belgium. It was released in the United Kingdom and Ireland on 9 March 2012.

== Music video ==
A music video to accompany the release of "We're All No One" was released on YouTube on 30 October 2011.

== Track listing ==
US/Australian digital download
No.	Title	Length
1.	"We're All No One" (edit)	3:20
2.	"We're All No One" (Nervo Goes to Paris Remix)	5:41
3.	"We're All No One" (Hook n Sling Remix)	6:01
4.	"We're All No One" (Dave Audé Club Mix)	8:14
5.	"We're All No One" (Jungle Fiction Remix)	4:03
6.	"We're All No One" (original mix)	3:36
Total length:		30:55

UK digital download
No.	Title	Length
1.	"We're All No One" (UK radio edit)	3:29
2.	"We're All No One" (Nervo Goes to Paris Remix)	5:40
3.	"We're All No One" (Hook n Sling Remix)	6:01
4.	"We're All No One" (Dave Audé Club Mix)	8:14
5.	"We're All No One" (Autoerotique Remix)	5:10
6.	"We're All No One" (original mix)	3:16
Total length:		31:50

== Chart performance ==
Chart performance for "We're All No One"
Chart (2011–12)	Peak position
Belgium Dance (Ultratop Flanders)	24
Belgium (Ultratip Bubbling Under Flanders)	56
Netherlands (Single Top 100)	89
UK Singles (Official Charts Company)	135
UK Dance (OCC)	27
US Dance/Mix Show Airplay (Billboard)	16
US Dance Club Songs (Billboard)	8

== Release history ==
Release history and formats for "We're All No One"
Country	Date	Format	Label
Australia	2 September 2011	Digital download	Astralwerks
United States	2 September 2011	Digital download	Astralwerks
Belgium	16 December 2011	Digital download	Astralwerks
Ireland	9 March 2012	Digital download	Astralwerks
United Kingdom	9 March 2012	Digital download	Astralwerks
