= The Bloody Beetroots =

Italian electronic music project

The Bloody Beetroots (Bob Rifo)
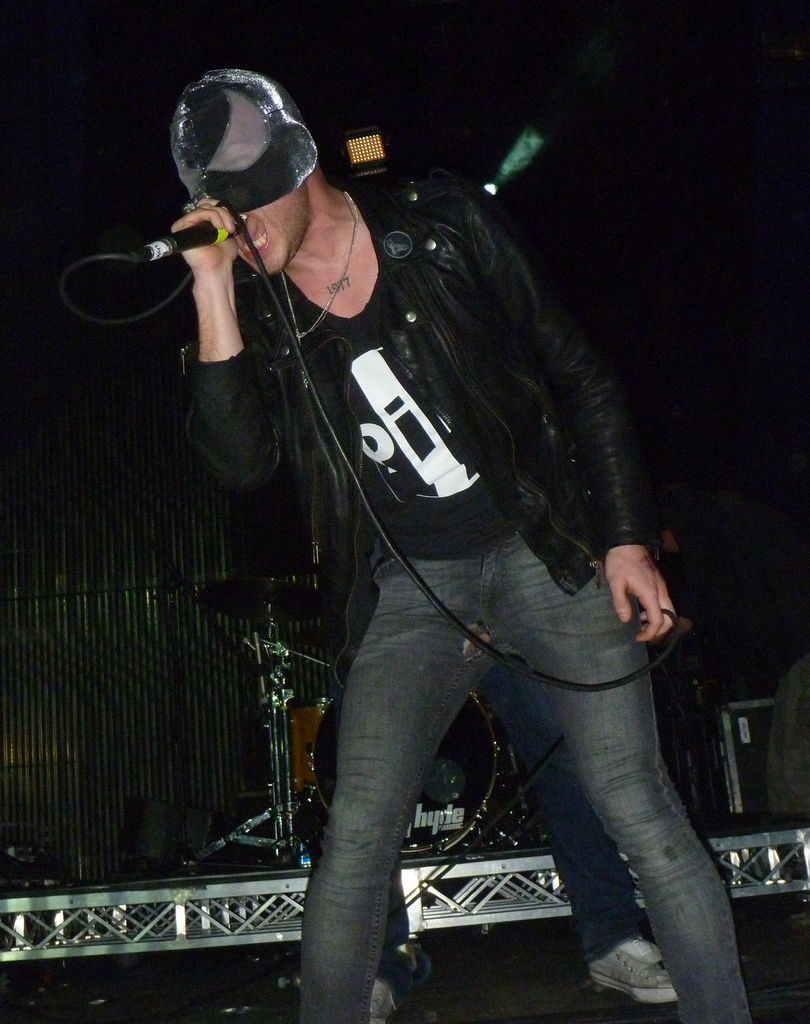
- Bob Rifo in 2010

Background information
- Also known as: Sir Bob Cornelius Rifo; SBCR; Bobermann
- Born: 18 December 1977 (age 48); Bassano del Grappa, Italy
- Genres: Electro house; dance-punk; dubstep; drum and bass
- Occupations: Producer; musician; DJ; photographer; actor; athlete
- Instruments: Guitar; bass; keyboards; drums; synthesizers
- Years active: 2006–present
- Labels: Dim Mak; Ultra; Columbia; Ministry of Sound Australia; Last Gang; Sixpack France; Downtown Music; Monstercat
- Website: bloodybeetroots.com

The Bloody Beetroots is an Italian electronic music project of musician and producer Bob Rifo (also Sir Bob Cornelius Rifo) and SBCR (born Simone Cogo). Established in late 2005, the Bloody Beetroots were initially a DJ duo consisting of Bob Rifo and Tommy Tea, who later left in 2012.

== Career ==
The leader of the band, Sir Bob Cornelius Rifo, was born in 1977 in Bassano del Grappa, Italy. He lives between Italy and the United States. He is a classically trained musician, but gained reputation for producing music with styles ranging from punk rock to the new wave of the 1980s. His identity remains largely anonymous. In fact, the only identifying public feature he has is the year "1977" tattooed across his chest, which is the year of his birth, that coincided with the year punk-rock was born. Rifo, a music producer, DJ and photographer uses the pseudonym the Bloody Beetroots himself.

=== 2005–2009: Early production and Romborama ===
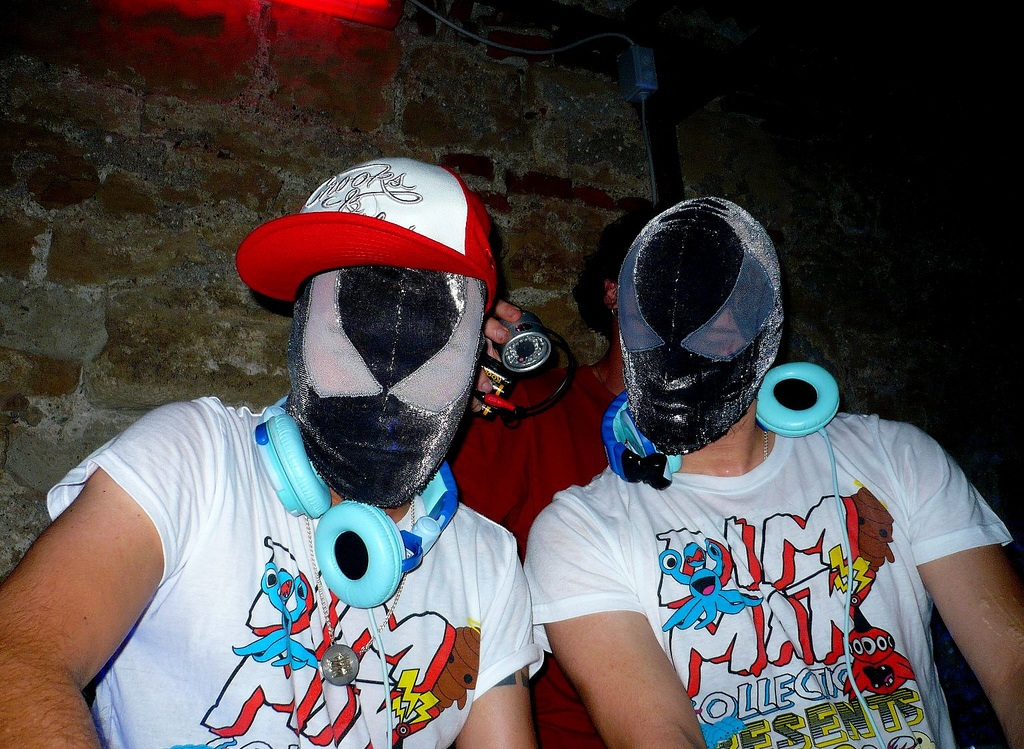
Bloody Beetroots DJ Set in 2009

Sir Bob Cornelius Rifo gained the support of Etienne De Crecy, Alex Gopher, and Dim Mak's Steve Aoki with his early singles "Warp 1.9" and "Cornelius", In 2008, his EP Cornelius was in the Top 100 International iTunes downloads.

In 2009, the Bloody Beetroots released his first album, Romborama. The Bloody Beetroots DJ Set (Sir Rifo and ex-member Tommy Tea) had a short tour of the United States in early 2008, alongside DJ Steve Aoki.

In 2009, Sir Rifo also worked on Rifoki, a hardcore punk band with Steve Aoki.

=== 2010–2011: Death Crew 77 ===
Bloody Beetroots DJ Set played festivals including Stereosonic Festival in Australia, Ultra Music Festival in Miami and Rock Werchter in Belgium. During his 2010 Live Tour, Sir Rifo labeled himself and the live band the Bloody Beetroots Death Crew 77 and introduced drummer Edward Grinch. Tommy Tea was in charge of effects and sampling in the live band. In 2011, Grinch left the band and replacement drummer Battle took his place. Later in 2011, during the Church of Noise tour, vocalist Dennis Lyxzén of the punk band Refused joined and provided vocals for a few songs. With the new live show they continued playing various festivals across the world, including the Solidays Festival in Paris, MELT! Festival in Berlin, Extrema Festival in Eindhoven, Tomorrowland in Belgium, HARD Fest in Los Angeles, Electric Zoo in New York City, and headlined the 2011 New Year's Eve show at the Together as One festival in Los Angeles.

=== 2012–2014: Hide ===
In 2013, the Bloody Beetroots released the album Hide.

The first single, "Rocksteady", was released in late December 2011 along with two remix EPs. The second single, "Chronicles of a Fallen Love" (featuring Greta Svabo Bech) was released in December 2012, also with the two-part remix EPs. In February 2013, Bob Rifo announced a third single "Spank" (produced with TAI and Bart B More), as well as an accompanying music video. Sir Bob Cornelius Rifo also collaborated with Paul McCartney on the single "Out of Sight" on Ultra Records. It was released in June 2013.

For the entirety of 2012, Rifo and Tommy Tea toured the world as Bloody Beetroots DJ Set, including performances on festivals such as Tomorrowland, Ultra Music Festival and HARD Fest New York.

At the beginning of 2013, Sir Bob Cornelius Rifo re-introduced the live crew under the new name the Bloody Beetroots Live, which debuted in Australia in January. The mask Rifo wears on stage has been re-designed as well – now featuring wearable LED lights on the Venom-shaped eyes, which are controlled remotely via MIDI. The rest of the band also wears new masks, though they do not light up like Rifo's.

The live band consisted of Sir Bob Cornelius Rifo (piano/effects, guitars, vocals), Battle (synthesizers, bass guitar) and Edward Grinch (drums). However, in Australia, Grinch was replaced by member New Mad Harris on drums. Since the beginning of 2013, Tommy Tea has dedicated himself to other personal projects.

In 2013, Rifo announced and released a new social media platform called "the Real Church of Noise", which is a "safe haven for like-minded individuals to share and collaborate". The platform incorporates sharing services such as YouTube and SoundCloud.

=== 2015–present: SBCR and The Great Electronic Swindle ===
Shortly after the Chaos and Confusion tour, Rifo began to DJ across the world under the pseudonym SBCR (an acronym of his stage name). From 2015 to 2016, he released a series of SBCR & Friends EPs on Dim Mak Records.

In 2017, Rifo released two new songs under the Bloody Beetroots name: a collaboration with Australian band Jet titled "My Name Is Thunder", and a solo song titled "Satan Bass City Rockers". Rifo later announced the songs would be included on his third album, The Great Electronic Swindle, which was released on 20 October 2017.

In 2021, Rifo and Tom Morello released the collaborative EP The Catastrophists.

== Members ==
| Name | Members and details |
|---|---|
| The Bloody Beetroots | Sir Bob Cornelius Rifo – production, vocals, guitar, keyboards, bass, DJ |
| The Bloody Beetroots DJ Set | Sir Bob Cornelius Rifo – DJ (2005–present); Tommy Tea – FX music controllers (2007–2012) |
| The Bloody Beetroots – Death Crew 77 (Live crew in 2010–2013) | Sir Bob Cornelius Rifo; Tommy Tea – FX music controllers (2007–2012); Battle – synths (2011–2013); Dennis Lyxzén – vocals (Occasional Guest); Edward Grinch – drums (2010–2011, 2013) |
| The Bloody Beetroots LIVE (Live crew in 2013–present) | Sir Bob Cornelius Rifo; Battle – synths (2011–2014); Nick Thayer – synths (2016–present); Edward Grinch – drums (2010–2014); Jacopo Volpe – drums (2016–present); Mad Harris – drums (January 2013; Big Day Out); Tommy Lee – drums (Occasional Guest) |

== Discography ==
=== Studio albums ===
List of studio albums, with selected chart positions
| Title | Album details | Peak chart positions | | | | |
| Title | Album details | ITA | AUS | BEL (Fl) | BEL (Wa) | FR |
|---|---|---|---|---|---|---|
| Romborama | Released: 25 August 2009; Label: Dim Mak; Formats: CD, digital download | — | 21 | 49 | 91 | — |
| Hide | Released: 16 September 2013; Label: Ultra; Formats: CD, digital download | 40 | 28 | 200 | 104 | 87 |
| The Great Electronic Swindle | Released: 27 October 2017; Label: Last Gang | — | — | — | — | — |
"—" denotes an album that did not chart or was not released.

=== Compilations ===
| Year | Album | Peak positions | Label |
| Year | Album | FR | Label |
|---|---|---|---|
| 2008 | Let Your Washing Machine Speak: Productions & Remixes | — | Self-released |
| 2011 | Best of...Remixes | 111 | Dim Mak |

=== EPs ===
| Year | Title | Label |
|---|---|---|
| 2007 | I Love the Bloody Beetroots | Self-released |
| 2008 | Cornelius EP | Dim Mak |
| 2008 | Rombo EP | Dim Mak |
| 2009 | Christmas Vendetta ...Spares of Romborama | Dim Mak |
| 2010 | Domino (Spares of Romborama – Pt. 2) | Dim Mak |
| 2011 | Church of Noise (Remixes) (featuring Dennis Lyxzén) | Ultra |
| 2012 | Rocksteady (Remixes Part 1) | Ultra |
| 2012 | Rocksteady (Remixes Part 2) | Ultra |
| 2013 | Chronicles of a Fallen Love (Remixes Part 1) (with Greta Svabo Bech) | Ultra |
| 2013 | Chronicles of a Fallen Love (Remixes Part 2) (with Greta Svabo Bech) | Ultra |
| 2013 | Spank (Remixes) (featuring Tai & Bart B More) | Ultra |
| 2013 | Out of Sight (Remixes) (featuring Paul McCartney and Youth) | Ultra |
| 2013 | All the Girls (Around the World) (The Remixes) (featuring Theophilus London) | Ultra |
| 2014 | The Beat (Remixes) (featuring Peter Frampton) | Ultra |
| 2014 | Keep On Dancing (Remixes) (featuring Drop the Lime) | Ultra |
| 2014 | Accidentally on Purpose (Sanremo's Festival 2014) (with Raphael Gualazzi) | SUGAR S.r.l. |
| 2015 | SBCR & Friends, Vol. 1 (as SBCR) | Dim Mak |
| 2015 | SBCR & Adversaries, Vol. 2 (as SBCR) | Dim Mak |
| 2016 | SBCR & Punks, Vol. 3 (as SBCR) | Dim Mak |
| 2019 | Warp 10 Year Anniversary: 2009 - 2019 (featuring Steve Aoki) | Dim Mak |
| 2019 | Heavy | Fuzz O Rama |
| 2021 | The Catastrophists EP (Tom Morello & The Bloody Beetroots) | Comandante |
| 2021 | RiMS Racing (Official Soundtrack) | Fuzz O Rama |
| 2025 | FOREVER PART ONE | Out Of Line |

=== Singles ===
==== As lead artist ====
| Year | Title | Peak positions | | | Album |
| Year | Title | AUS | BEL (Fl) | FR | Album |
|---|---|---|---|---|---|
| 2009 | "Warp 1.9" (featuring Steve Aoki) | 51 | 53 | — | Romborama |
| 2009 | "Awesome" (featuring the Cool Kids) | 83 | — | — | Romborama |
| 2009 | "Come La" (featuring Marracash) | — | — | — | Romborama |
| 2010 | "2nd Streets Have No Name" (featuring Beta Bow) | — | — | — | Romborama |
| 2010 | "Domino" | — | — | — | Non-album singles |
| 2010 | "New Noise" (feat. Refused and Steve Aoki) | — | — | — | Non-album singles |
| 2011 | "Church of Noise" (featuring Dennis Lyxzén) | — | — | — | Non-album singles |
| 2012 | "Rocksteady" | — | — | — | Hide |
| 2013 | "Chronicles of a Fallen Love" (featuring Greta Svabo Bech) | — | — | — | Hide |
| 2013 | "Spank" (featuring Tai and Bart B More) | — | — | — | Hide |
| 2013 | "Out of Sight" (featuring Paul McCartney and Youth) | — | — | 97 | Hide |
| 2013 | "All the Girls (Around the World)" (featuring Theophilus London) | — | — | — | Hide |
| 2014 | "The Beat" (featuring Peter Frampton) | — | — | — | Hide |
| 2014 | "Keep On Dancing" (featuring Drop the Lime) | — | — | — | Hide |
| 2014 | "Liberi o no" (with Raphael Gualazzi) | — | — | — | Non-album singles |
| 2014 | "Tanto ci sei" (with Raphael Gualazzi) | — | — | — | Non-album singles |
| 2017 | "My Name Is Thunder" (with Jet) | — | — | — | The Great Electronic Swindle |
| 2017 | "Saint Bass City Rockers" | — | — | — | The Great Electronic Swindle |
| 2017 | "Pirates, Punks & Politics" (with Perry Farrell) | — | — | — | The Great Electronic Swindle |
| 2017 | "Crash" (with Jason Aalon Butler) | — | — | — | The Great Electronic Swindle |
| 2019 | "Wildchild" (with Ephwurd) | — | — | — | Non-album singles |
| 2019 | "Fkn Face" (with Dr. Fresch) | — | — | — | Non-album singles |
| 2019 | "Zoning" (with Zhu) | — | — | — | Non-album singles |
| 2020 | "Stand Up" (with Tom Morello, Shea Diamond, & Dan Reynolds) | — | — | — | Non-album singles |
| 2021 | "Elevate" (with Teddy Killerz) | — | — | — | Non-album singles |
| 2021 | "Jericho" (with Jacknife) | — | — | — | Non-album singles |
| 2021 | "Radium Girls" (Tom Morello & The Bloody Beetroots featuring Pussy Riot, Aimee Interrupter, White Lung, and The Last Internationale) | — | — | — | The Catastrophists EP |
| 2024 | "This Is Blood" (with N8NOFACE and Teddy Killerz) | — | — | — | FOREVER PART ONE |
| 2025 | "Killing Punk" (with Bob Vylan) | — | — | — | FOREVER PART ONE |
| 2025 | "NUMB" (with Tokky Horror) | — | — | — | FOREVER PART ONE |
| 2025 | "Clever" (with PENGSHUi) | — | — | — | FOREVER PART ONE |
| 2025 | "I'm Not Holy" (with Grabbitz) | — | — | — | FOREVER PART ONE |
| 2026 | "STOMPERS" (featuring Hyro The Hero and Mazare) | — | — | — | |
"—" denotes a recording that did not chart or was not released.

==== As featured artist ====
- "Run" (ShockOne featuring the Bloody Beetroots) (2019)
- "Grand Slam" (Jayceeoh featuring the Bloody Beetroots) (2019)
- "DAWGS" (Holly featuring the Bloody Beetroots) (2019)

=== Music videos ===
| Year | Title |
|---|---|
| 2008 | "Cornelius" |
| 2009 | "Butter" |
| 2009 | "Romborama" |
| 2009 | "Warp 1.9" (featuring Steve Aoki) |
| 2009 | "Come La" (featuring Marracash) |
| 2009 | "Awesome" (featuring the Cool Kids) |
| 2009 | "Awesome (Remix)" (featuring the Cool Kids) |
| 2010 | "2nd Streets Have No Name" (featuring Beta Bow) |
| 2010 | "Domino" |
| 2011 | "Church of Noise" (featuring Dennis Lyxzén) |
| 2012 | "Rocksteady" |
| 2012 | "Chronicles of a Fallen Love" (featuring Greta Svabo Bech) |
| 2013 | "Spank" (featuring Tai & Bart B More) |
| 2013 | "Out of Sight" (featuring Paul McCartney & Youth) |
| 2015 | "The Grid" (as SBCR) |
| 2024 | "This Is Blood" (featuring N8NOFACE & Teddy Killerz) |
| 2025 | "Killing Punk" (featuring Bob Vylan) |
| 2026 | "STOMPERS" (featuring Hyro The Hero & Mazare) |
