= Livin' My Love =

Single by Steve Aoki featuring LMFAO and Nervo

from the album Wonderland
- Released: January 10, 2012
- Recorded: 2011
- Length: 3:10
- Label: Dim Mak
- Songwriters: Steve Hiroyuki Aoki, Justin Robert Bates, Sky Ferreira, Skyler Austen Gordy, Stefan Kendal Gordy, Olivia Nervo, Miriam Nervo, Cory Nitta, Jon Henry, Josh Stevens Szymanski
- Producer: Steve Aoki

Steve Aoki singles chronology
"We're All No One" (2011)	"Livin' My Love" (2012)	"Beat Down" (2012)

LMFAO singles chronology
"Sexy and I Know It" (2011)	"Livin' My Love" (2012)	"Sorry for Party Rocking" (2012)

Nervo singles chronology
"We're All No One" (2011)	"Livin' My Love" (2012)	"You're Gonna Love Again" (2012)

"Livin' My Love" is a song by American DJ and producer Steve Aoki from his debut studio album Wonderland. It was released as a single on January 10, 2012. The song features vocals by American electro-hop duo LMFAO and Australian singer-songwriter duo Nervo.

== Track listing ==
CD single
No.	Title	Length
1.	"Livin' My Love" (Album Version)	3:10

== Credits and personnel ==
- Vocals – Skyler Gordy, Stefan Gordy, Miriam Nervo, Olivia Nervo
- Musician – Steve Aoki, Justin Bates
- Lyrics – Sky Ferreira, Cory Nitta, Jon Szymanski Josh Stevens
- Label: Dim Mak Records

== Charts ==
Chart (2012)	Peak position
Canada Hot 100 (Billboard)	68
South Korea International Singles (Gaon)	1
