= Wonderland (Steve Aoki album) =

Studio album by Steve Aoki
- Released: January 10, 2012
- Recorded: 2010–2012
- Genre: EDM
- Length: 55:19
- Labels: Ultra; Dim Mak
- Producers: Steve Aoki; Angger Dimas; Sick Boy; Laidback Luke; Afrojack; Travis Barker; Armand Van Helden; Sidney Samson

Steve Aoki chronology
Wonderland (2012)	Neon Future I (2014)

Singles from Wonderland
- 1. "Earthquakey People" Released: October 24, 2011; 2. "Ladi Dadi" Released: Dec 13, 2011; 3. "Livin' My Love" Released: January 10, 2012; 4. "Cudi the Kid" Released: April 10, 2012

Singles from Wonderland (Remixed)
- 1. "Beat Down" Released: May 31, 2012

Professional ratings
Aggregate scores
Source	Rating
Metacritic	54/100
Review scores
Source	Rating
AllMusic	3/5 stars
Consequence of Sound	3/5 stars
Los Angeles Times	2/4 stars
Now	2/5 stars
PopMatters	5/10

Wonderland is the debut studio album by American DJ and producer Steve Aoki. It was released on January 10, 2012, through Ultra Records and Dim Mak Records. It was nominated for a Grammy Award for Best Electronic/Dance Album in 2013. Most songs from the album were released as a single with its own remixes (exceptions being "Dangerous" and "Livin' My Love"). The remix album was released five months later on June 10, 2012.

== Track listing ==
No.	Title	Writer(s)	Producer(s)	Length
1.	"Earthquakey People" (featuring Rivers Cuomo)	Steve Aoki; Rivers Cuomo; Justin Bates; Lucas Secon	Steve Aoki	3:36
2.	"Ladi Dadi" (featuring Wynter Gordon)	Aoki; Bates; Diana Gordon	Steve Aoki	4:45
3.	"Dangerous" (featuring will.i.am)	Aoki; Bates; William Adams	Steve Aoki	3:41
4.	"Come with Me (Deadmeat)" (featuring Polina)	Aoki; Bates; Polina Goudieva	Steve Aoki	4:17
5.	"Emergency" (featuring Lil Jon and Chiddy Bang)	Aoki; Bates; Chidera Anamege; Jonathan Smith	Steve Aoki	3:37
6.	"Livin' My Love" (featuring LMFAO and NERVO)	Aoki; Bates; Sky Ferreira; Stefan Gordy; Skyler Gordy; Olivia Nervo; Miriam Nervo; Cory Nitta; Jon Szymanski	Steve Aoki	3:08
7.	"Control Freak" (featuring Blaqstarr and Kay)	Aoki; Bates; Kristin Boutilier; Charles Jamal Smith	Steve Aoki	3:37
8.	"Steve Jobs" (with Angger Dimas)	Aoki; Raden Angger Dimas Riyanto	Steve Aoki; Angger Dimas	6:15
9.	"Heartbreaker" (featuring Lovefoxxx)	Aoki; Bates; Luísa Matsushita; Rowland Okereke	Steve Aoki	4:11
10.	"Cudi the Kid" (featuring Kid Cudi and Travis Barker)	Aoki; Bates; Travis Barker; Scott Mescudi	Steve Aoki	4:46
11.	"Ooh" (featuring Rob Roy)	Aoki; Bates; Robert Raimon Roy; Luke Walker	Steve Aoki	4:46
12.	"The Kids Will Have Their Say" (with Sick Boy featuring The Exploited and Die Kreuzen)	Aoki; Robert Van Der Schild	Steve Aoki; Sick Boy	3:14
13.	"Earthquakey People (The Sequel)" (featuring Rivers Cuomo)	Aoki; Bates; Cuomo; Secon	Steve Aoki	6:07

Bonus tracks
No.	Title	Writer(s)	Producer(s)	Length
14.	"Turbulence" (radio edit) (with Laidback Luke featuring Lil Jon)	Aoki; Lucas van Scheppingen; J. Smith	Steve Aoki; Laidback Luke	3:48
15.	"No Beef" (with Afrojack featuring Miss Palmer)	Aoki; Nick Van De Wall; Alyssa Palmer	Steve Aoki; Afrojack	6:01
16.	"Misfits" (Travis Barker featuring Steve Aoki)	Aoki; Barker	Steve Aoki; Travis Barker	4:20

Japanese bonus tracks
No.	Title	Writer(s)	Producer(s)	Length
17.	"BRRRAT!" (with Armand Van Helden)	Aoki; Armand Van Helden	Steve Aoki; Armand Van Helden	3:51
18.	"Wake Up Call" (Sidney Samson featuring Steve Aoki)(Datsik Remix)	Aoki; Sidney Samson	Steve Aoki; Sidney Samson; Datsik (remixer)	4:01

Wonderland (Remixed)
No.	Title	Length
1.	"Earthquakey People" (Alvin Risk Remix)	3:39
2.	"Ladi Dadi" (Tommy Trash Remix)	5:14
3.	"Heartbreaker" (Metalmouse Remix)	4:39
4.	"Come with Me (Deadmeat)" (Jidax Remix)	4:17
5.	"Emergency" (Laidback Luke Remix)	5:20
6.	"Cudi the Kid" (Lucky Date VIP Drumstep Edit)	3:49
7.	"Control Freak" (Dillon Francis Remix)	3:55
8.	"Steve Jobs" (Moguai Remix)	6:18
9.	"Heartbreaker" (James Frew Remix)	5:23
10.	"Cudi the Kid" (Third Party Remix)	5:08
11.	"Ooh" (Mustard Pimp Remix)	5:40
12.	"The Kids Will Have Their Say" (Bassnectar Remix)	4:01
13.	"Emergency" (Clockwork Remix)	5:29
14.	"Ladi Dadi" (Part II)	4:45
15.	"Beat Down" (Original Mix)	4:04

== Personnel ==
Credits adapted from Spotify listing and Discogs.

- Steve Aoki – lead performance (track 1-15, 17), producer (all tracks), featured performance (track 16, 18)
- Afrojack – lead performance, producer (track 15)
- Travis Barker – featured performance (track 10), lead performance and producer (track 16)
- Justin Bates – recording engineer (all tracks)
- Blaqstarr – featured performance (track 7)
- Chiddy Bang – featured performance (track 5)
- Rivers Cuomo – featured performance (track 1, 13)
- Die Kreuzen – featured performance (track 12)
- Angger Dimas – featured performance, producer (track 8)
- The Exploited – featured performance (track 12)
- Wynter Gordon – featured performance (track 2)
- Kay – featured performance (track 7)
- Kid Cudi – featured performance (track 10)
- Laidback Luke – lead performance, producer (track 14)
- Lil Jon – featured performance (track 5, 14)
- LMFAO – featured performance (track 6)
- Lovefoxxx – featured performance (track 9)
- Miss Palmer – featured performance (track 15)
- NERVO – featured performance (track 6)
- Polina – featured performance (track 4)
- Rob Roy – featured performance (track 11)
- Sick Boy – lead performance, producer (track 12)
- Sidney Samson – lead performance, producer (track 18)
- Armand Van Helden – lead performance, producer (track 17)
- will.i.am – featured performance (track 3)

== Chart history ==
Chart (2012)	Peak; position
Belgian Albums (Ultratop Flanders)	199
Japanese Albums (Oricon)	120
US Billboard 200	59
US Top Dance Albums (Billboard)	6
US Digital Albums (Billboard)	15
US Independent Albums (Billboard)	7

== See also ==
- Dim Mak Records
- Ultra Records
