= Jaleo (Nicky Jam and Steve Aoki song) =

2018 single by Nicky Jam and Steve Aoki

Single by Nicky Jam and Steve Aoki
- Language: Spanish
- Released: October 5, 2018
- Genre: EDM; reggaeton
- Length: 2:56
- Label: Sony Latin
- Songwriters: Nick Rivera Caminero; Steve Aoki; Carlos Jim Vrolijk; Juan Diego Medina Vélez; Memru Renjaan; Mike Gazzo
- Producer: Steve Aoki

Nicky Jam singles chronology
| "Satisfacción" (2018) | "Jaleo" (2018) | "Good Vibes" (2018) |

Steve Aoki singles chronology
| "Be Somebody" (2018) | "Jaleo" (2018) | "Hoovela" (2018) |

Music video
- "Jaleo" on YouTube

"Jaleo" (English: "Busy") is a song by American singer Nicky Jam and American producer Steve Aoki, it was released on October 5, 2018 via Sony Latin, The single written by Nicky Jam, Steve Aoki, Carlos Jim Vrolijk, Juan Diego Medina Vélez, Memru Renjaan, Mike Gazzo and produced by Steve Aoki.

== Background ==
Nicky and Steve commented each other, Steve said: “So excited about dropping Jaleo with my brother Nicky Jam. This record was so fun to make and I’m so happy to share it with the world!!

And Nicky said: “Jaleo is a song that we recorded so that our fans from all over can enjoy. Its been an honor to collaborate with Steve, whom I thank for producing the song that has us so pumped to release!! We are ready to form a “Jaleo” (rucus)!!

== Composition ==
The song is a combination of invigorating latin rhythms and electronic beats.

== Music video ==
The music video was released on October 5, 2018, directed by Jessy Terrero. The video was filmed in Miami, showed the stimulating pool party with beautiful ladies having fun under the sun.

== Charts ==
=== Weekly charts ===
| Chart (2018) | Peak position |
|---|---|
| Belgium (Ultratip Bubbling Under Wallonia) | 4 |
| Spain (Promusicae) | 78 |
| US Hot Dance/Electronic Songs (Billboard) | 19 |
| US Latin Airplay (Billboard) | 17 |
| US Hot Latin Songs (Billboard) | 24 |

=== Year-end charts ===
| Chart (2018) | Position |
|---|---|
| US Hot Dance/Electronic Songs (Billboard) | 86 |
| Chart (2019) | Position |
| US Hot Dance/Electronic Songs (Billboard) | 61 |
