= Turbulence (song) =

Single by Laidback Luke and Steve Aoki featuring Lil Jon

from the album Wonderland
- Released: May 14, 2011 (UK)
- Recorded: 2011
- Genre: Big room house; crunk
- Length: 3:52 (video version); 6:25 (original mix)
- Label: Mixmash; Dim Mak; Ultra; New State
- Songwriters: Steve Aoki; Lucas van Scheppingen; Jonathan Smith
- Producers: Laidback Luke; Steve Aoki

Laidback Luke singles chronology
"Leave the World Behind" (2009)	"Turbulence" (2011)	"Better Off Alone (Laidback Luke Remix)" (2011)

Steve Aoki singles chronology
"Wake Up Call" (2010)	"Turbulence" (2011)	"No Beef" (2011)

Lil Jon singles chronology
"Twisted" (2011)	"Turbulence" (2011)	"Hard White (Up in the Club)" (2011)

"Turbulence" is a song by Laidback Luke and Steve Aoki featuring vocals from American rapper Lil Jon. It was released on 14 May 2011 as a digital download in the United Kingdom and was released on 17 July 2011 as an EP. The radio edit version of the song was included on the bonus track version of Steve Aoki's debut album Wonderland. The song was also the official goal song for the Toronto Maple Leafs during the 2013-14 season, while Brigham Young University’s Football and Basketball Teams use the song during hype videos in the fourth quarter end end of the second half respectively.

== Music video ==
A music video to accompany the release of "Turbulence" was first released onto YouTube on 8 March 2011 at a total length of three minutes and fifty-seven seconds. The video shows Aoki, Luke, & Jon at a concert, with Aoki and Luke dressed as pilots, as storm clouds appear and lightning bolts strike down.

== Track listing ==
UK Digital download
No.	Title	Length
1.	"Turbulence" (Radio Edit)	3:01

US Digital download
No.	Title	Length
1.	"Turbulence" (Radio Edit)	3:48

EP
No.	Title	Length
1.	"Turbulence" (Radio Edit)	3:01
2.	"Turbulence" (Original Mix)	6:25
3.	"Turbulence" (Sidney Samson Remix)	6:07
4.	"Turbulence" (Tocadisco Remix)	4:56

Remixes — EP
No.	Title	Length
1.	"Turbulence" (Sidney Samson Remix)	6:07
2.	"Turbulence" (Tocadisco Remix)	5:00
3.	"Turbulence" (Sandro Silva Remix)	6:34
4.	"Turbulence" (D.O.D. Remix)	5:39
5.	"Turbulence" (C6 Remix)	7:33

== Chart performance ==
Chart (2011)	Peak Position
Global Dance Songs (Billboard)	27
Dance/Electronic Digital Song Sales (Billboard)	27
UK Singles Chart	66
Australia (ARIA)	37

== Release history ==
Region	Format	Release	Label
United Kingdom	Digital Download - Single	14 May 2011	New State Music
United Kingdom	Digital Download - EP	17 July 2011	New State Music
