= I'm in the House =

2010 single by Steve Aoki

Single by Steve Aoki featuring Zuper Blahq
- Released: November 23, 2009; March 7, 2010
- Recorded: 2009
- Genre: Electro house
- Length: 5:06
- Label: Data
- Songwriters: Steve Aoki; Justin Robert Bates
- Producer: Steve Aoki

Steve Aoki singles chronology
"Warp" (2009)	"I'm in the House" (2009)	"New Noise" (2010)

will.i.am singles chronology
"Wavin' Flag" (Celebration Mix) (2010)	""I'm in the House"" (2010)	"Check It Out" (2010)

Alternative cover
- The cover of the iTunes and UK single version

"I'm in the House" is the debut single by American DJ Steve Aoki, featuring vocals from American rapper will.i.am as his alter ego Zuper Blahq (stylized as Zuper Blahq and pronounced "super black"). The song was first released via iTunes on November 23, 2009, and was made officially available as a single on March 7, 2010. The song reached No. 29 on the UK Singles Chart and later entered the UK Dance Chart and the UK Indie Chart, peaking within the top five in each chart.

== Music video ==
The video mixes live action with vast amounts of animation. It begins with Zuper Blahq (will.i.am) declaring that he is in the house; although not specified at this moment, it is revealed to be Steve Aoki's house. The song then applies a reverse storytelling technique about how Blahq came to be in Aoki's house, with Blahq getting lost and going to a house to ask for directions, only to find that it is the house of his good friend Aoki. They find the situation incredibly amusing and decide to write a song about the series of unusual events.

== Track listing ==
Digital download
No.	Title	Length
1.	"I'm in the House" (Album version)	3:19
2.	"I'm in the House" (The Count a.k.a. Hervé's Burning Down Your House Remix)	4:37
3.	"I'm in the House" (Gigi Barocco)	5:37
4.	"I'm in the House" (Dub)	4:03

CD single
No.	Title	Length
1.	"I'm in the House" (Radio Edit)	3:12
2.	"I'm in the House" (Sharam Love Fest Remix)	8:46
3.	"I'm in the House" (featuring LMFAO) (Party Rock Remix)	3:33

== Trivia ==
- will.i.am announced the creation of his balaclava-wearing alter ego Zuper Blahq before this song was released, further stating that he wanted to create a full album as Zuper Blahq; he later abandoned this plan, making "I'm in the House" the only Zuper Blahq release.
- The song was used in an episode of MTV's Jersey Shore.

== Chart performance ==
The song first entered the UK Singles Chart on March 14, 2010, at number 29 and went to number 1 on the UK Indie Chart in the same week, later dropping two places to number 3 in the following week on March 21, 2010. It was number 3 on the UK Dance Chart on March 14, 2010 and went down to number 5 on March 21, 2010.

Chart (2010)	Peak Position
Belgium (Ultratop 50 Flanders)	43
Netherlands (Single Top 100)	40
Poland (Dance Top 50)	34
UK Dance (OCC)	3
UK Indie (OCC)	1
UK Singles (OCC)	29

== Release history ==
Region	Format	Release
United Kingdom	Digital download, CD single	7 March 2010
Europe	Digital download, CD single	8 March 2010
