= No Beef =

- UK Cover

Single by Afrojack and Steve Aoki featuring Miss Palmer

from the album Wonderland
- Released: 22 August 2011
- Recorded: 2010
- Genre: Electro house, progressive house
- Length: 6:02; 2:39 (UK Radio Edit)
- Label: Wall / Spinnin, All Around the World, Ultra
- Songwriters: Nick Van De Wall, Steve Aoki, Alyssa Palmer
- Producers: Afrojack, Steve Aoki

Afrojack singles chronology
"Selecta" (2011)	"No Beef" (2011)	"We're All No One" (2011)

Steve Aoki singles chronology
"Turbulence" (2011)	"No Beef" (2011)	"We're All No One" (2011)

Miss Palmer singles chronology
"No Beef" (2011)

"No Beef" is a song by Dutch producer Afrojack in collaboration with American DJ Steve Aoki featuring vocals from American singer Miss Palmer. The single was released digitally on 22 August 2011 in the Netherlands. The song was included as a bonus track in Aoki's 2012 debut album Wonderland. In 2015, Spin named it the 21st greatest electronic dance music (EDM) anthem of the first half of the 2010s.

== Music video ==
A music video to accompany the release of "No Beef" was first released onto YouTube on 16 August 2011 at a total length of five minutes and thirty-two seconds. It was directed by Punit Dhesi and produced by Nima Nejat and Kam Saran. It features footage of both Afrojack and Aoki on stage and backstage at the 2011 Electric Daisy Carnival. The video also features guest appearances from American rapper Flo Rida, American model and former Playboy Playmate Holly Madison, professional poker players Michael Mizrachi, Antonio Esfandiari and Phil Laak, former Ultimate Fighting Championship Chuck Liddell and American rapper and record producer Lil Jon.

Steve Aoki secretly recorded part of the video with a cell phone at a gift shop in Las Vegas, without the shop's permission. The shop turned that into a marketing opportunity by prominently featuring the gifts purchased in the video.

== Track listing ==
Digital download
No.	Title	Length
1.	"No Beef" (Vocal Mix)	6:01
2.	"No Beef" (Instrumental Mix)	6:02

UK Digital download
No.	Title	Length
1.	"No Beef" (UK Radio Edit)	2:39
2.	"No Beef" (Vocal Mix)	6:03
3.	"No Beef" (Gigamesh Remix)	4:45
4.	"No Beef" (Nu:Tone Remix)	5:14
5.	"No Beef" (Instrumental Mix)	6:02

== Chart performance ==
Chart (2011–2012)	Peak position
Belgium (Ultratip Bubbling Under Flanders)	5
Belgium (Ultratip Bubbling Under Wallonia)	21
France (SNEP)	42
Netherlands (Dutch Top 40)	26
Scotland Singles (Official Charts)	19
UK Dance (Official Charts)	6
UK Indie (Official Charts)	39
UK Singles (Official Charts)	25

== Release history ==
Country	Date	Format	Label
United States	1 February 2011		
Netherlands	22 August 2011	Digital download	Wall Recordings / Spinnin Records
United Kingdom	6 November 2011	Digital download	All Around the World Productions
