= Angger Dimas =

Indonesian musician (born 1988)

- Born: Raden Angger Dimas Riyanto; 1 March 1988 (age 38); Jakarta, Indonesia
- Genres: Electro house, progressive house, trap, moombahton, tech house
- Years active: 2009–present
- Labels: Vicious, Dim Mak, Mixmash, Mad Decent, Spinnin', Ultra, Armada, Revealed
- Spouse: Tamara Tyasmara (m. 2017; div. 2021)
- Website: anggerdimas.com

Raden Angger Dimas Riyanto (born 1 March 1988) professionally known as Angger Dimas, is an Indonesian electronic musician, DJ and music producer from Jakarta, Indonesia. Angger Dimas was a student of 34 Senior High School, Jakarta & 68 Junior High School, Jakarta. He started playing guitar at age 7 and first became active in the Jakarta club scene in 2009. He is the #1 DJ of Indonesia according to thedjlist.com.

== Personal life ==
Angger was married to Tamara Tyasmara, a film star, in 2017. They had a son, Raden Andante Khalif Pramudityo (2017–2024), and divorced in 2021.

== Career ==
Angger Dimas signed with Australian record label Vicious Vinyl in early 2009. His debut release "Duck Army" was played by Tocadisco, Joachim Garraud, Laidback Luke and more. Dimas then collaborated with Vandalism and earned international support on their release "She Got It" which was included on the Ministry of Sound Australia Annual 2010 CD and played by Sebastian Ingrosso as his opening track at the "Sensation" New Year's Eve event in Melbourne. Their collaboration was regularly heard in the playlists of David Guetta, Chuckie, Armand Van Helden, Laidback Luke and Axwell.

Angger Dimas continued releasing remixes including Richard Vission & Static Revenger "I Like That", which reached #1 on the Cool Cuts Club Chart UK, Avicii, Afrojack, R3hab, Ian Carey, Kaskade, Tommie Sunshine, Amy Meredith, Sandro Silva (DJ) and Havana Brown (musician). Angger opened for DJ Tiësto in Bangkok 2010, after which the two collaborated to create the group called "Boys Will Be Boys". In 2011 they released the 3 track EP "We Rock." The title track reached the Top 10 of the Beatport Electro House chart, and was also featured on Tiësto's Clublife Mix Compilation Album. In 2011, he teamed up with Belgian trio Dimitri Vegas & Like Mike and Yves V, on their collaborative release "Madagascar", written for the Tomorrowland Festival. One of his earlier tracks "Hey Freak" was leaked when it featured in the DJ sets of Afrojack, Steve Aoki and Laidback Luke at the Electric Daisy Carnival festival.

Angger Dimas has now DJ'ed in Australia and New Zealand with multiple tours in February 2010 supporting Avicii, November 2010, February 2011 supporting Oliver Twizt & Laidback Luke and again in November 2011 with Hardwell & Calvertron. In September 2011 Angger toured USA playing together with Steve Aoki & Sidney Samson in Las Vegas and played the Nocturnal Festival alongside the Bassjackers, Dirty South (musician) and Avicii and then co-headlined an ADE party in Amsterdam with Hardwell. 2012 saw the release of collaborations with Steve Aoki, "Steve Jobs", Phat Brahms, Beat Down and a remix of Afrojack & R3hab's "Prutataaa", the first track of Angger's first album "Release Me" (featuring Polina) and a collaboration with Bassjackers, "RIA". Later in the year Angger played at Tomorrowland (Belgium) on the Dim Mak Up All Night Stage and also joining Steve Aoki, Dimitri Vegas & Like Mike on the mainstage to debut their new collaboration 'Phat Brahms' live on the Tomorrowland TV Stream.

Angger has been showing his existences by releasing singles and collaboration with the likes of Diplo, Travis Porter and Will Brennan. Angger also co-producer(remix) for Linkin Park and Steve Aoki's single and Yellow Claw. Angger Dimas also is number 134 on DJMAG 2015 and number 1 in Indonesia and Asia so far.

== Current work ==
Angger Dimas debut album titled Angger Management came out on Steve Aoki's Dim Mak Records and Vicious Recordings on 3 September 2013. On the album, there are collaborations with Steve Aoki, Tara McDonald & Piyu on the track "More Than Just A Feeling", Vandalism and many more. Along with the album, Angger Dimas has announced a forthcoming tour throughout North America. The 'Angger Management' Tour starts at Electric Zoo Festival 1 September 2013 and ends after a performance at the debut of TomorrowWorld in the United States, where Angger will join Dim Mak artists and Steve Aoki on the Up All Night Stage.

== Selected discography ==
=== Albums ===
- 2013 – Angger Management (Dim Mak)

=== Singles and EPs ===
- 2009 Vandalism & Angger Dimas – She Got It 12" (Rise)
- 2010 Are You Ready (Vicious Recordings)
- 2010 Love Is What We've Got – Angger Dimas And Digital Lab (Vicious Recordings)
- 2010 Plastik (Vicious Recordings)
- 2011 Big Fucking House – Angger Dimas vs. Tommy Trash (Vicious Recordings)
- 2011 Doomsday - Angger Dimas (Mixmash Records)
- 2011 Madagascar (Mostiko) – Dimitri Vegas – Like Mike, Yves V & Angger Dimas
- 2011 We Rock EP – Tiësto, Angger Dimas & Showtek present Boys Will Be Boys (Musical Freedom)
- 2012 RIA — Angger Dimas & Bassjackers (Doorn Records)
- 2012 Beat Down – Steve Aoki & Angger Dimas (feat. Iggy Azalea)
- 2012 Coffee Shots – Angger Dimas & Piyulogi Feat. ANI & RamaRival
- 2012 Hey Freak! – Angger Dimas (Mixmash Records)
- 2012 Kitchen – Angger Dimas (Mixmash Records)
- 2012 Night Like This – Laidback Luke & Angger Dimas (feat. Polina)
- 2012 Phat Brahms – Steve Aoki & Angger Dimas Vs. Dimitri Vegas & Like Mike
- 2012 Release Me – Angger Dimas feat. Polina (Vicious Recordings)
- 2012 Resurrection – Angger Dimas (Vicious Recordings)
- 2012 Steve Jobs – Steve Aoki feat Angger Dimas (Dim Mak Records/Ultra Records)
- 2012 Work My Love – Angger Dimas (Mixmash Records)
- 2012 Booster – Angger Dimas feat MC Ambush (Vicious Recordings/Dim Mak Records)
- 2013 Singularity – Steve Aoki, Angger Dimas feat. My Name is Kay
- 2015 Zombie – Angger Dimas feat. Luciana (Mixmash Records)
- 2016 Angger Dimas - Angger Dimas & Friends EP (Be Rich Records)
- 2016 Drop That Low (feat. FERAL is KINKY) – Angger Dimas & South Control (Dim Mak Records)
- 2016 NOAH - Sendiri Lagi (Angger Dimas Remix) (Musica Studios)
- 2018 Angger Dimas & Nervo - Give It All Up (Armada Music)
- 2019 Thomas Gold & Angger Dimas - HI LO (Revealed Recordings)
- 2019 Angger Dimas x Wendy Marc - Glad You Came (Be Rich Records)
