= Dim Mak Records =

American record label

Dim Mak
- Founded: 1996
- Founder: Steve Aoki
- Genre: Various
- Country of origin: United States
- Location: Los Angeles, California
- Official website: dimmak.com

Dim Mak Records is an independent, Los Angeles–based record label, events company, and lifestyle brand founded by Steve Aoki in 1996. The label has released music under the genres of punk, indie rock, hardcore, hip hop, and electronic dance music.

== History ==
=== Early years ===
Steve Aoki started Dim Mak Records in 1996 at the age of 19, out of his college apartment at the University of California, Santa Barbara. The label's first release was a 7-inch record by a hardcore punk band called Stickfigurecarousel. The name "Dim Mak" is a reference to Bruce Lee's Death Touch martial art technique. Prior to launching Dim Mak, Aoki was involved in the local hardcore punk scene. As a writer for a small zine, Aoki would often receive demos and albums to review. Meanwhile, he began hosting punk and hardcore shows in the living room of his college apartment, which came to be known as The Pickle Patch. Hundreds of acts played in this early space, sometimes in exchange for a place to sleep for the night, including The Rapture, Jimmy Eat World, Atom & His Package, and more. The relationships formed throughout these formative years served as a crucial foundation for what would later become Dim Mak Records. In 2001, Dim Mak released one of the label's first nationally recognized projects with the self-titled debut EP from Pretty Girls Make Graves. Following the success of this record along with The Kills’ Black Rooster in 2002, Aoki relocated Dim Mak to Los Angeles, initiating the label's second era.

=== Indie rock era ===
In 2003, Dim Mak began to build out its roster through the addition of indie rock artists, beginning with the U.K. band Bloc Party. After mailing Aoki a 7-inch of their track "She's Hearing Voices", the group signed to Dim Mak Records. Shortly afterwards, Dim Mak entered into a partnership with VICE (a subsidiary of Atlantic Records), for the rights to Bloc Party, marking Dim Mak's first deal with a major label. Together, Dim Mak and Atlantic released Bloc Party's debut album Silent Alarm in 2005, which went on to sell over 350,000 physical albums.

=== Electro era ===
As underground dance music began incorporating (which was coined electro at the time), Dim Mak shifted with the times and entered its electro era. One of the biggest tracks of this era came when Steve Aoki collaborated with The Bloody Beetroots for "Warp 1.9", the lead single off their debut album Romborama. Thump placed the track at #19 on their 101 Best EDM Songs of All Time list and called it 'Perhaps the definitive track from that particularly fruitful period of hook-laden abrasiveness.'

Around the same time, Dim Mak released an album from Mstrkrft titled Fist of God, which brought major pop and hip-hop collaborators into the electro scene.

=== New Noise ===
New Noise is Dim Mak's new music discovery imprint that focuses on cutting-edge sounds from burgeoning artists across the genre spectrum. Launched in 2010, New Noise got its start as a compilation series highlighting fresh faces handpicked by Steve Aoki and crew. By 2015, the platform evolved into a bi-weekly, free-download platform based on singles. Ghastly's underground house single "Every Night" was the first release of many under this format. As of 2016, New Noise's current incarnation is a copyright free model that allows the budding community of Twitch gamers and amateur YouTube content creators to use New Noise music in their videos and live streams sans purchase or fees, all in exchange for linking back to the artists and their music.

== Music publishing ==
Steve Aoki founded Dim Mak Publishing in 2014, as the fourth division of the Dim Mak brand. Since its launch, songs from the Dim Mak Publishing repertoire have landed major sync placements across national advertising campaigns (T-Mobile, Acura), feature films (Sausage Party, Ride Along 2, Why Him?) and TV programs (Transparent, CSI: Cyber). On August 9, 2017, Dim Mak Publishing announced that it had signed a global deal with Warner/Chappell Music, the music publishing arm of Warner Music Group. Warner/Chappell now administers the entire Dim Mak Publishing catalog, which includes a wide variety of dance/electronic works from songwriters such as Autoerotique, Garmiani, Henry Fong, Max Styler, Ookay, Quix, Shaun Frank, Stööki Sound, and Viceroy.

== Associated artists ==
- 2Deep
- Steve Aoki
- Atari Teenage Riot
- Autoerotique
- Aviella
- Bloc Party
- The Bloody Beetroots
- Cetana
- Chemical Surf
- Chyl
- The Deadly Syndrome
- Diamond Pistols
- Angger Dimas
- Dimitri Vegas & Like Mike
- Dyro
- Henry Fong
- Shaun Frank
- Garmiani
- Wolfgang Gartner
- Ghastly
- Cheyenne Giles
- Global Dan
- Godlands
- Gossip
- I Wish I
- Jstjr
- Keys N Krates
- The Kills
- Laidback Luke
- Lil Jon
- Linney
- Moistbreezy
- Mstrkrft
- Mustard Pimp
- Niiko X Swae
- Nitro Fun
- Nostalgix
- Yumi Nu
- Oh No Oh My
- Ookay
- Pls&TY
- Pretty Girls Make Graves
- Quix
- RayRay
- Callie Reiff
- Bella Renee
- Alvin Risk
- Rob Roy
- Scanners
- Dan Sena
- Shndō
- Sickboy
- Sikdope
- Snavs
- Softest Hard
- Stickfigurecarousel
- Stööki Sound
- Max Styler
- Dani Thorne
- Tiësto
- Viceroy
- Vincent
- WatchTheDuck
- XTRMST
- Zedd
- Zuper Blahq (alias of Will.i.am)

=== Notes ===
Some Steve Aoki releases are co-released alongside Ultra Records as well as Dim Mak Records, however, they are officially registered under the Ultra Records discography.

== Events ==
Dim Mak events have featured performances from a diverse range of acts such as Migos, Lil Uzi Vert, Thomas Bangalter of Daft Punk, Skrillex, Rae Sremmurd, Kid Cudi, Zedd, Lady Gaga, Waka Flocka Flame, Will.i.am, Dillon Francis, Diplo, Justice, Afrojack, Travis Scott, Bloc Party, Borgore, Yellow Claw, and Steve Angello.

=== Dim Mak Tuesdays ===
From 2003 to 2014, Dim Mak held weekly events known as Dim Mak Tuesdays at Dim Mak Studios (previously known as Cinespace) in Hollywood, California. The list of artists who have performed at Dim Mark Tuesdays includes Lady Gaga, Justice, Diplo, will.i.am, and Daft Punk's Thomas Bangalter.

=== Festival stages ===
To date, Dim Mak has hosted branded Dim Mak Stages at major music festivals around the world.

Year	Event title	Ref.
2009	Get Loaded, London	
2010	Electric Daisy Carnival, Las Vegas	
2010	Playground, Jakarta	
2010	We Love Sounds/Winterland Soundsystem, Australia	
2011	Tomorrowland, Belgium	
2011	Beatpatrol, Austria	
2011	Optimus Festival, Lisbon	
2011	Future Music, Australia	
2012	Electric Daisy Carnival, Las Vegas	
2012	Beatpatrol, Austria	
2013	Tomorrowland, Belgium	
2013	TomorrowWorld, Atlanta	
2013	Electric Zoo, New York City	
2013	Beatpatrol, Austria	
2014	TomorrowWorld, Atlanta	
2014	Tomorrowland, Belgium	
2015	Tomorrowland, Belgium	
2015	Tomorrowland, Brazil	
2016	Electric Zoo, New York City	
2017	Tomorrowland, Belgium	
2017	Sziget Festival, Budapest	

=== Special events ===
Dim Mak has an established history of producing special events at key music conferences such as SXSW and Miami Music Week. Also in 2006 and 2007, Dim Mak hosted a music festival in Los Angeles called Neighborhood.

Year	Event title	Ref.
2004	CMJ	
2005	CMJ	
2006	CMJ	
2006	Neighborhood	
2007	Neighborhood	
2007	SXSW	
2009	SXSW	
2010	SXSW	
2011	Miami	
2011	SXSW	
2012	Miami	
2012	SXSW	
2013	Miami	
2013	SXSW	
2014	Miami	
2014	SXSW	
2015	Miami	
2015	SXSW	
2016	Miami	
2016	Amsterdam Dance Event	
2017	Miami	
2018	Miami	
2018	Dim Mak Neighborhood - Brooklyn NYC	

=== 20th anniversary tour ===
In 2016, Dim Mak commemorated its 20-year anniversary with 20 events around the world.

Date	Venue	Ref.
March 17, 2016	Miami	
March 19, 2016	SXSW	
April 23, 2016	Atlanta	
June 10, 2016	Chicago	
June 29, 2016	Ibiza	
July 27, 2016	Malta	
August 17, 2016	Mallorca	
August 18, 2016	Barcelona	
September 3, 2016	New York City	
September 3, 2016	New York City	
September 4, 2016	Las Vegas	
September 16, 2016	Montreal	
September 24, 2016	Scottsdale	
October 23, 2016	Amsterdam	
October 30, 2016	Tampa Bay	
November 18, 2016	San Francisco	
November 19, 2016	Newport Beach	
November 29, 2016	Los Angeles	
December 8, 2016	Maui	
December 9, 2016	Oahu	

== Clothing & accessories ==
In 2014, Dim Mak Collection was launched. From its launch Dim Mak has been worn by celebrities and influencers including Gucci Mane, Migos, David Guetta and Bella Thorne and has been featured in The New York Times, Vogue among others.

In addition to the proprietary Dim Mak Collection has collaborated with other influential clothing and accessory brands on limited edition collections. Those are listed as:

Year	Brand	Ref.
2008	WESC	
2009	55DSL	
2009	Diesel	
2009	Parra	
2012	Han Cholo	
2016	RVCA	
2016	Sol Republic	
2016	Drew Merritt	
2017	Converse	
2017	CYRCLE	
2017	David Choe	
