= Drew Danburry =

Singer-songwriter

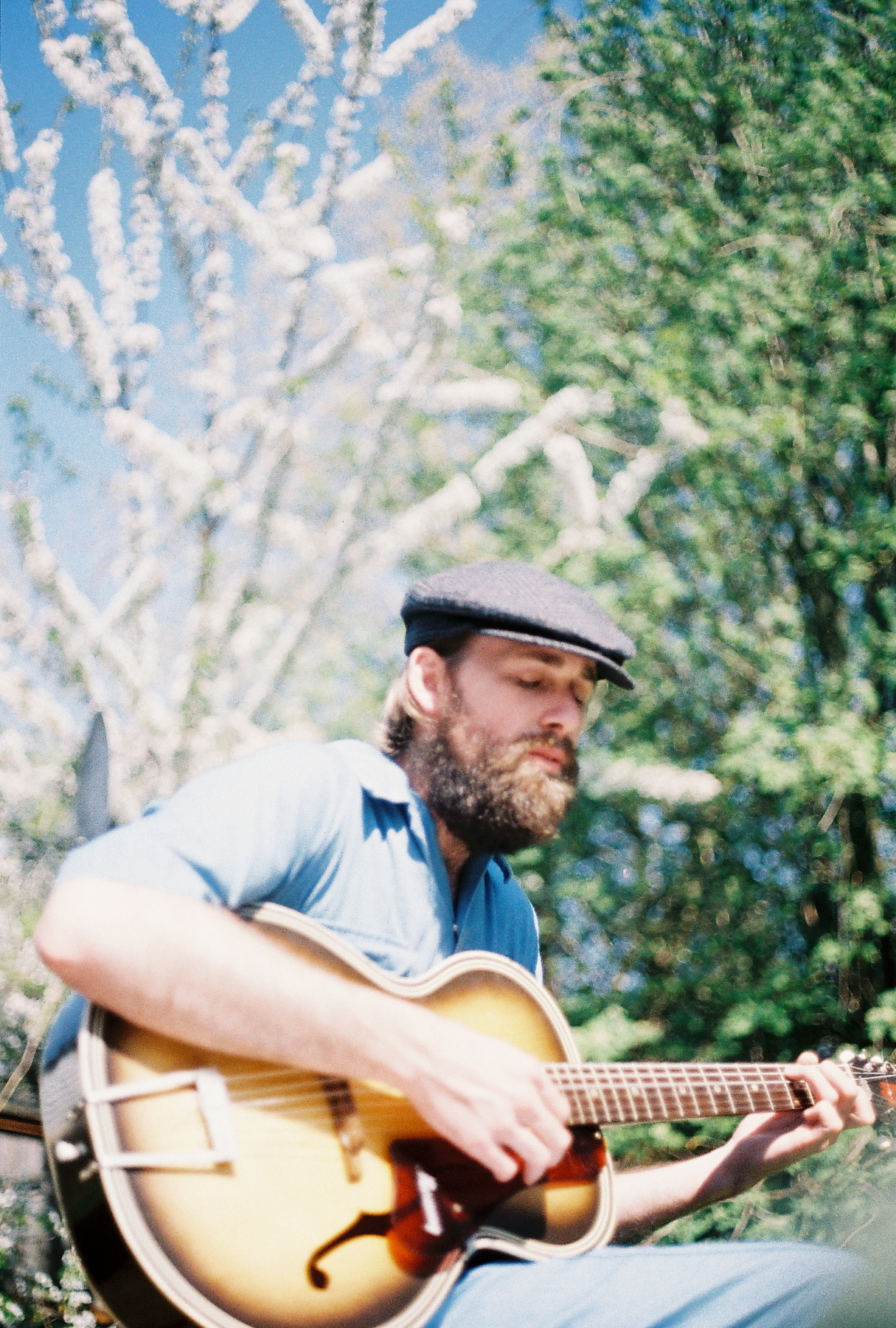

Background information
- Genres: Indie, Folk, Singer-Songwriter
- Occupation: Singer-songwriter
- Instruments: Vocals guitar piano
- Years active: 2002 – current
- Labels: Emergency Umbrella; Another Record
- Members: Drew Danburry
- Past members: Josh Rosenberg, Micah Dahl Anderson, Rob Myers, Elliot Maldonado, Travis Bunn, Wyatt McKenzie
- Website: drewdanburry.com

Drew Danburry is an American folk-pop singer-songwriter who has toured independently and released records since 2002. He currently owns and runs a barber shop in Provo, Utah. He is also a filmmaker, and released his debut documentary Skateboarding Is Not Tony Hawk Pro Skater. He is a founder of the band Icarus Phoenix.

== History ==
=== Beginnings (2003–2005) ===
Beginning in 2005, he re-released a shorter version of his first album An Introduction to Sex Rock and released his second album Besides: Are We Just Playing Around Out Here Or Do We Mean What We Say?

=== Full-time (2006–2007) ===
In 2006, he embarked on a seven-month-long national tour playing pretty much everywhere he could in the United States. He toured for short stints with Harry and the Potters, Aubrey Debauchery, TaughtMe, and Seve vs. Evan. He played shows with the bands Deer Tick, Viking Moses, Joshua James, Headlights, The Little Ones, Horse Feathers, Red Pony Clock, Jason Anderson, Cedarwell, and Southerly. He met Elliot Maldonado who began to play banjo with him and in the fall they embarked on a two-month-long self-booked European tour. They decided to name the new formation of the musical project "Drew Danburry/Fatal Fury and the Lasercats".

In 2007, Danburry released Drew Danburry/Fatal Fury and the Lasercats's Live in France! a live album from two separate shows recorded in France and toured with the bands Lilu Dallas, BigBigCar (later known as Grampall Jookabox, or just Jookabox), Jacob Smigel, The Robot Ate Me, Aubrey Debauchery, Riesage, and Iji. At the turn of July he marked his 500th show at Kilby Court in Salt Lake City since his tour kickoff there in February 2005 and announced his indefinite hiatus from touring for a chance to recoup physically, emotionally and financially.

By the end of the year, though, he had already released a new EP called Mother. He had been invited back to play the Pop Montreal Music Festival, and played shows with Lydia, Zookeeper, Umbrellas, Jake Bellows (of Neva Dinova), Someone Still Loves You Boris Yeltsin, Headlights, Mount Eerie, Thanksgiving, Deer Tick, Math the Band, Fishboy, Everthus the Deadbeats, Chick Pimp, June Madrona, and Seve vs. Evan.

=== Emergency Umbrella Records (2008–2010) ===
In 2008, Danburry signed to the label Emergency Umbrella Records and established an official lineup for the band that lasted for roughly two weeks until finances forced him to again tour alone. He released the album This Could Mean Trouble, You Don't Speak for the Club

In 2009, he toured with the bands Someone Still Loves You Boris Yeltsin, Ryland Bouchard (previously The Robot Ate Me), Emperor X, Zoe Boekbinder (of Vermillion Lies) and Desert Noises. He played the Pop Montreal Music Festival and the Pygmalion Music Festival. He played shows with Lenka, Pomegranates, Wye Oak, Grand Archives, The Local Natives, Elsinoire, Hallelujah the Hills, The Terrordactyls, Polka Dot Dot Dot, and many other independent artists such as The Awful Truth, Iji, Fishboy, Viking Moses, Wild Moccasins, Wonky Tonk, Ash Reiter, JP Haynie, Jacob Smigel, Will Sartain, Adam and Darcie, and Chick Pimp, Coke Dealer at a Bar. He also released the EP Geraniums with the French label Another Record.

In 2010, he played with the bands Miniature Tigers, Paleo and Cameron McGill. He released the album Goodnight Gary on Emergency Umbrella Records and self-released the sequel Goodnight Dannii. He began a large amount of side projects and played his supposed "last live show" at Kilby Court on May 14, 2010.

== 2016–present ==
After a 6-year break Danburry began touring again in 2016. In 2020, he formed a group called Icarus Phoenix, which has released a series of albums, which have included collaborations with Josaleigh Pollett, Lake Mary, Neva Dinova, Corbino, and Teleprom.

== Discography ==
- An Introduction to Sex Rock (self-released, 2004)
- Besides: Are We Just Playing Around Out Here... (self-released, 2005)
- Live In France! (self-released, 2007), as Drew Danburry/Fatal Fury and the Lasercats
- Mother EP (self-released, 2007)
- This Could Mean Trouble, You Don't Speak For the Club (Emergency Umbrella, 2008)
- Geraniums EP (Another Record, 2009)
- Goodnight Gary (Emergency Umbrella, 2010)
- Goodnight Dannii (Emergency Umbrella, 2010)
- Grad School Application (self-released, 2010)
- The First Pillar – EP (self-released, 2013)
- Becoming Bastian Salazar (self-released, 2013)
