= The Robot Ate Me =

American experimental indie rock band

- "Djien" from Good World (2006)

Background information
- Origin: San Diego, California
- Genres: Indie rock, indie pop, indie folk, folk, art rock, experimental rock, experimental pop, psychedelic rock, psychedelic pop
- Years active: 2002 – current
- Labels: Swim Slowly Records; 5 Rue Christine; Kill Rock Stars
- Members: Ryland Bouchard
- Past members: David Greenberg, Are-Jay Hoffman, William Haworth, Alan Lechusza
- Website: therobotateme.com

The Robot Ate Me is an experimental indie rock band formed by Ryland Bouchard in 2002. The band has been through many distinct phases incorporating aspects of folk, jazz, psychedelia and avant-garde rock. Their critically acclaimed albums alternated between accessible pop and obscure musical art projects. After releasing Good World in 2006, Babysue described the band as "one of the most unpredictable and obtuse underground bands around."

== Biography ==
In 2002 Ryland Bouchard released They Ate Themselves, his first record as The Robot Ate Me and played his first shows in San Diego opening for notable touring acts such as Daniel Johnston, Tegan and Sara, Metric, Stars and The Blackheart Procession. Skyscraper magazine described this release as "Quite possibly the year's most arresting experimental pop record, They Ate Themselves is a dizzyingly vibrant trip through death and multi-layered dissonance".

The controversial and highly experimental On Vacation was released in 2004. Adam Gnade declared "It's not even music outside the margins. Here the margins were never there, and if they were to encroach, The Robot Ate Me would probably up and croak. " Punk Planet followed suit describing the album as "A hypnotic two-disc record that will score your twisted nightmares and fanciful dreams." Splendid summarized "It is impossible to understand a Robot Ate Me album from a written description." The band Oh No Oh My named themselves after the song "Oh No! Oh My!" from On Vacation.

After the release of On Vacation in 2004, he signed with Kill Rock Stars and toured the US heavily the next few years playing close to 600 shows in the following three years playing with countless bands including The Mae Shi, Barr, The Fall, Hella, Mount Eerie, Karl Blau, The Winks, Doveman, I Need Sleep, The Gossip, Oh No! Oh My!, Okkervil River, Emperor X, and Drew Danburry. His shows relied heavily on audience participation and were known for being fairly unpredictable. As part of his shows he would sometimes be dragged across the floor by attendees, wear masks, scream loudly, have the audience play the supporting instruments for his songs without rehearsal, or abruptly leave after playing one song.

The 2005 release of Carousel Waltz brought a set of minimal American folk songs. The album was lauded by Babysue as a "strangely compelling and uplifting vision of how love affects a person. Soft and focused, these unusual tunes are simultaneously accessible and peculiar. The Robot Ate Me remains one of the most unique acts on the planet. Brimming with credible substance, Carousel Waltz is yet another killer album from an artist who just keeps getting better and better with time..."

The avant-garde Good World was released in 2006; it was composed primarily of sparse clarinet lines mixed with minimal percussion and falsetto vocals by Bouchard. Pitchforkmedia asked "Has someone bludgeoned frontman Ryland Bouchard?". And Tinymixtapes declared: "Not since the glory days of punk has an album come and gone so fast and left one with more questions than answers."

In November 2011, after releasing several albums under his own name, Bouchard announced a new album by The Robot Ate Me would be released in 2012.

== Discography ==
=== Albums ===
- They Ate Themselves (Swim Slowly, 2002)
- Live at the CBC (Swim Slowly, 2003)
- On Vacation (Swim Slowly, 2004)
- On Vacation (5 Rue Christine, 2005, Reissue)
- Carousel Waltz (5 Rue Christine, 2005)
- Good World (5 Rue Christine, 2006)
- Bridge by Bridge (Swim Slowly, 2013)
- Circumstance (Swim Slowly, 2013)

=== Compilation Appearances ===
- Translation. Music. 3 Substandard (2003) - "Plane"
- Yeti 3, Yeti (2005) - "We Were Humans"
- Sur La Mer Samp Le Mer, 5RC / Kill Rock Stars (2006) - "Lynching Luncheon"
- Winter Holiday Album, 5RC / Kill Rock Stars (2006) - "Wonderland"

== Band members ==
- Ryland Bouchard

=== Past members and contributors ===
- David Greenberg (drums)
- Are-Jay Hoffman (bass/violin)
- William Haworth (drums, horns, synthesizers)
- Alan Lechusza (woodwinds and orchestral arrangements on Carousel Waltz)
- Edan Rosenberg (helped write lyrics for Carousel Waltz)
- Daniel Gibson (completed the artwork for all the albums)
