= Oh No Oh My =

Four-piece indie rock band

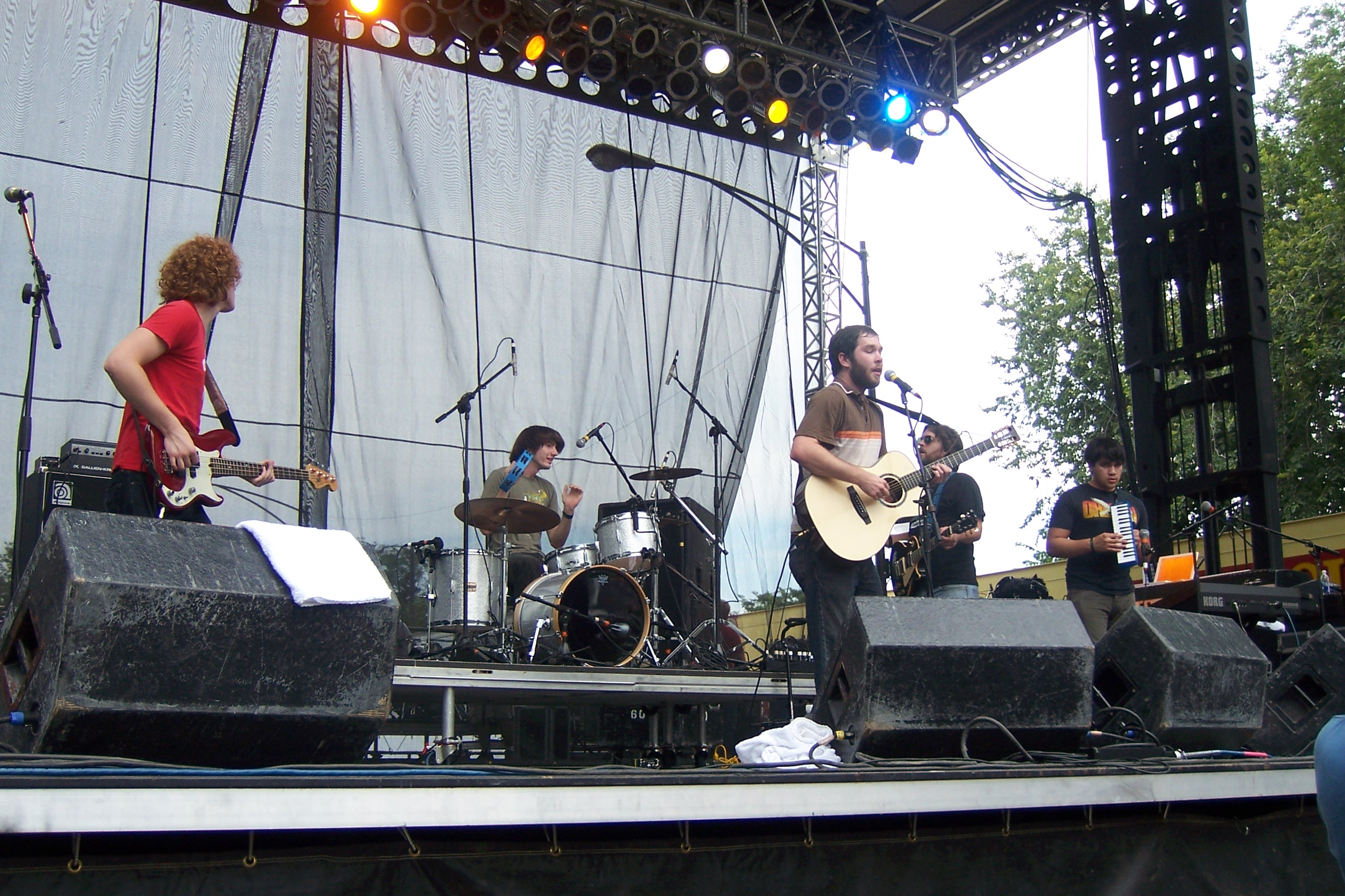
- Oh No Oh My - Live concert at Lollapalooza Festival, Chicago, Illinois (2006)

Background information
- Origin: Austin, Texas, United States
- Genres: Indie rock
- Years active: 2004–2013
- Label: Independent
- Members: Daniel Hoxmeier; Joel Calvin; Greg Barkley; Tim Regan

Oh No Oh My are a four-piece indie rock band from Austin, Texas.

== Biography ==
Oh No Oh My consists of multi-instrumentalists Daniel Hoxmeier, Joel Calvin, Greg Barkley, and Tim Regan. The members of Oh No Oh My started playing music when they were fourteen years old, and all of them play at least three different instruments. Daniel (Vocals, Guitars, Bass, Keys) and Joel Calvin (Drums, Percussion, Bass) were friends growing up; Greg Barkley (Vocals, Guitars, Bass, Keys) joined the boys after Daniel and Joel “stole Greg from his previous band." Originally calling themselves The Jolly Rogers, a decision to drive the band in a new direction resulted in a name change—the current Oh No Oh My moniker was inspired by a song by The Robot Ate Me.

The group moved to Nashville, Tennessee in January 2006 to continue with their music, where they played several local shows, experimented with their lineup, and released their debut, self-titled album. It was here the trio met up with most recent addition, Tim Regan (Guitars, Keys, Bass, Vocals). In September 2006, the group left Nashville to play a series of shows across the United States, including opening for The Flaming Lips and Gnarls Barkley.

After permanently returning to Austin in October 2006, with occasional jaunts across the country with bands such as Mew, The Deadly Syndrome, Let's Go Sailing, and Au Revoir Simone, Oh No Oh My re-released Between the Devil and the Sea in August 2007. The EP featured five songs originally recorded in their Jolly Rogers days.

The band received press in May 2008 when one of their fans was denied entry to Six Flags Fiesta Texas for wearing a T-shirt which appeared to illustrate two girls consuming small children.

In 2008, the band removed the exclamation marks from their band name, to simplify identification, and avoid confusion in general.

On January 18, 2011, their second full-length album, "People Problems" was released.

== Band members ==
- Greg Barkley
- Joel Calvin
- Daniel Hoxmeier
- Tim Regan

== Discography ==
=== Albums ===
- Oh No! Oh My! (Self-released, 2006)
- People Problems (January 18, 2011)
- I Am On Your Side (August 24, 2013)

=== EPs ===
- Between the Devil and the Sea (Self Released, 2005)
- Dmitrij Dmitrij (Self Released, 2008)

== In Film ==
Their song "I Have No Sister" was featured in the 2008 film, Medicine for Melancholy, written and directed by Barry Jenkins.

Their song "Walk in the Park" was featured in season 3, episode 5 of the series Weeds, in an episode entitled "Bill Sussman".
