= On Vacation =

On Vacation may refer to:

- On Vacation (The Robot Ate Me album), 2004
- On Vacation (CFCF album), 2016
- "On Vacation", a song by Aimee Allen from A Little Happiness
