= The Deadly Syndrome =

American rock band

- Origin: Los Angeles, California
- Genres: Indie rock, alternative rock
- Years active: 2006 - 2013
- Label: Dim Mak Records
- Members: Will Etling; Jesse Hoy; Michael Hughes; Crash Richard

The Deadly Syndrome was a musical group based in Los Angeles, California.

== Biography ==
The band was formed in 2006 by Will Etling, Jesse Hoy, Michael Hughes, and Crash Richard. In fall of 2006, the band was signed to the record label Dim Mak Records.

Immediately after being signed, the band began working on its debut album, The Ortolan, which was released worldwide on September 11, 2007, and produced by Nico Aglietti and Aaron Older of the band Edward Sharpe and the Magnetic Zeros.

The Ortolan received favorable reviews from Allmusic, the Los Angeles Times, The Tripwire , Pitchfork Media, and French rock magazine Les InRockuptibles .

Prior to the album's release, the band toured in California with Oh No! Oh My! and Let's Go Sailing, and played shows with The Airborne Toxic Event opening for them. In July 2007, they toured with Hot Hot Heat whose frontman Steve Bays cited their sound as one of his new favorites in an interview on Rolling Stone.

In 2009, The Deadly Syndrome opened for Silversun Pickups at The Glass House in Pomona, California, as well as Lykke Li at The Wiltern in Los Angeles, California. In November 2009, the band played several shows across the Southwest with Edward Sharpe and the Magnetic Zeros.

In February 2010, the band announced plans to self-release a second LP, titled Nolens Volens. The album was engineered and produced by band member Michael Hughes at Hughes' home, mixing duties were shared by Hughes and Kennie Takahashi. Nolens Volens was released on March 23, 2010 to favorable reviews.

Their song "I Hope I Become a Ghost" can be heard on the "World's Greatest Dad" and Detention of the Dead soundtracks and their song "Young at Heart" can be heard on the Jackass 3.5.

On March 20, 2012, the band released the video for "Demons", the first track off their newest album All In Time.

All In Time was released on August 7, 2012.

On January 7, 2013, the band announced that they were officially separating, on statements released via their websites and various social networks.

Now a member of Edward Sharpe and the Magnetic Zeros, Crash Richard released solo works, Hardly Criminal in early 2014, and Big Waste in early 2018.

On June 21, 2019, following the release of The Ortolan on vinyl the band broke their silence with a small statement thanking those who helped finish releasing all three albums on vinyl and ended with the statement with "You won’t be hearing from us anymore. It was a pleasure walking down memory lane with you. Until next time...goodbye…..goodbye…….goodbye……sorry about the stumps....."- The same day the band released their final song, a cover of Frank Sinatras 'Young at Heart'.

== Band members ==
- Will Etling
- Jesse Hoy
- Michael Hughes
- Crash Richard

== Discography ==
- The Ortolan (Dim Mak, 2007)
- Nolens Volens (Self-released, 2010)
- All In Time (Self-released, 2012)
