= Wakaba Higuchi =

Japanese retired figure skater (born 2001)

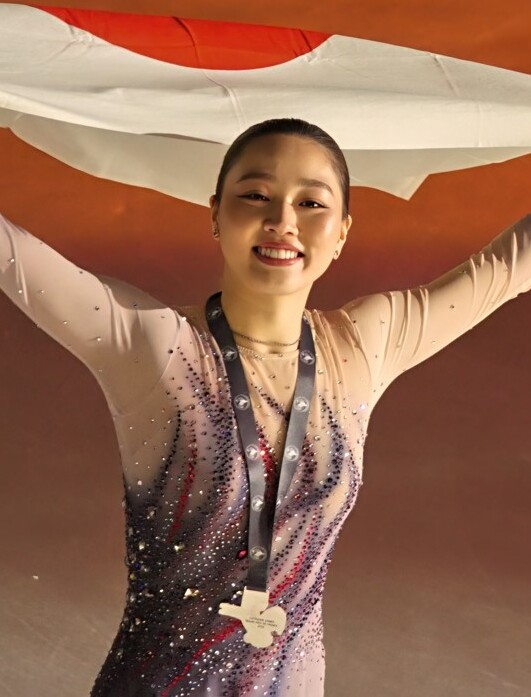
- Higuchi at the 2024 Grand Prix de France

Personal information
- Native name: 樋口 新葉
- Born: January 2, 2001 (age 25) Tokyo, Japan
- Home town: Tokyo, Japan
- Height: 1.52 m (5 ft 0 in)

Figure skating career
- Country: Japan
- Coach: Koji Okajima; Noriko Sato
- Skating club: NOEVIR
- Began skating: 2004
- Competitive: 2011 – 2026
- Retired: March 9, 2026
Event	Gold medal – first place	Silver medal – second place	Bronze medal – third place
Olympic Games	0	1	0
World Championships	0	1	0
Japan Championships	0	4	2
World Team Trophy	1	0	0
World Junior Championships	0	0	2
Junior Grand Prix Final	0	0	1
Medal list
Olympic Games
Silver medal – second place	2022 Beijing	Team
World Championships
Silver medal – second place	2018 Milan	Singles
Japan Championships
Silver medal – second place	2015–16 Sapporo	Singles
Silver medal – second place	2016–17 Osaka	Singles
Silver medal – second place	2019–20 Tokyo	Singles
Silver medal – second place	2021–22 Saitama	Singles
Bronze medal – third place	2014–15 Nagano	Singles
Bronze medal – third place	2024–25 Osaka	Singles
World Team Trophy
Gold medal – first place	2017 Tokyo	Team
World Junior Championships
Bronze medal – third place	2015 Tallinn	Singles
Bronze medal – third place	2016 Debrecen	Singles
Junior Grand Prix Final
Bronze medal – third place	2014–15 Barcelona	Singles

Wakaba Higuchi (樋口 新葉, Higuchi Wakaba; born January 2, 2001) is a Japanese retired figure skater. She is a 2022 Olympic team event silver medalist, the 2018 World silver medalist, the 2024 Skate America champion, a three-time Grand Prix silver medalist (2017 Cup of China; 2020 NHK Trophy; 2024 Grand Prix de France), a three-time Grand Prix bronze medalist (2016 and 2021 Grand Prix de France; 2017 Rostelecom Cup), a three-time Challenger Series medalist, and a six-time Japanese national medalist (bronze in 2015 and 2025, silver in 2016, 2017, 2020, and 2022). On the junior level, she is a two-time World Junior bronze medalist (2015, 2016), the 2014–15 Junior Grand Prix Final bronze medalist, and a two-time Japan Junior national champion (2015, 2016). (Note: On 29 January 2024, the CAS disqualified Valieva for four years retroactive to 25 December 2021 for an anti-doping rule violation. On 30 January 2024, the ISU reallocated medals to upgrade the United States to gold and Japan to silver, while downgrading the ROC to bronze.)

Higuchi is the seventeenth woman to land a clean triple Axel internationally, the fourth woman to land a clean triple Axel at the Olympics, and one of two women (the other being Mao Asada) to land multiple clean triple axels at a single Olympics.

== Personal life ==
Wakaba Higuchi was born January 2, 2001, in Tokyo, Japan. She is the youngest of three children — her brother, Daisuke, and sister, Saki, are five and eight years older, respectively. She studied at Meiji University's School of Commerce and graduated in 2023.

== Career ==
=== Early career ===
Higuchi began skating at age three and has been coached by Koji Okajima since the age of five.

Higuchi appeared internationally on the novice level for three seasons beginning in 2011–2012. She won novice titles at the Gardena Spring Trophy, International Challenge Cup, and Asian Trophy.

As the 2013 Japanese national novice champion, she was invited to skate in the gala at the 2013 NHK Trophy and 2014 World Championships.

=== 2014–2015 season: World Junior bronze ===
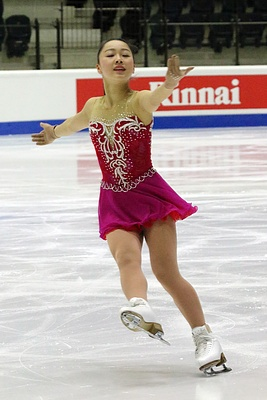
Higuchi at the 2015 World Junior Championships.

In the 2014–2015 season, Higuchi became age-eligible for international junior competitions. Having opened her season at the Asian Trophy, she made her Junior Grand Prix (JGP) debut in Ostrava, Czech Republic, taking silver. With a gold medal at her second JGP event in Dresden, Germany, she qualified for the 2014–15 JGP Final.

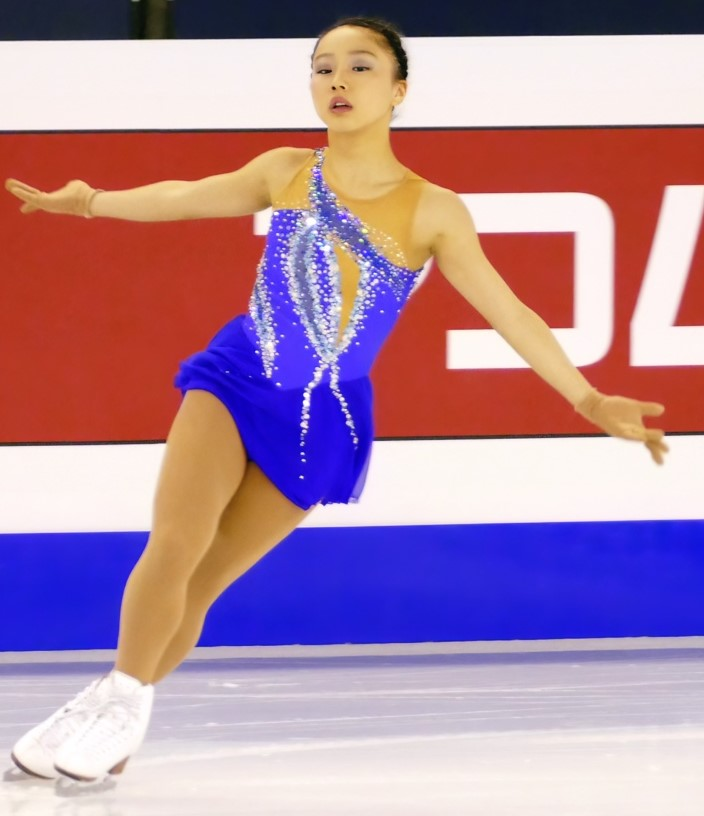
Higuchi performing her free skate at the 2014–15 Grand Prix of Figure Skating Final

Higuchi won the Japanese national junior title in November before competing at the JGP Final in Barcelona, Spain. Ranked fifth in the short program and third in the free skate, she finished third overall, behind Evgenia Medvedeva and Serafima Sakhanovich. She then took the bronze medal in her senior national debut at the Japan Championships. In her first appearance at the World Junior Championships, she won the bronze medal after placing third in the short program and second in the free skate.

As the Junior World bronze medalist, she was invited to skate in the gala at the 2015 World Team Trophy.

=== 2015–2016 season: Second World Junior bronze ===
At the beginning of the 2015–2016 season, Higuchi suffered from a back injury. Competing in the JGP series, she finished fifth in Linz, Austria before winning silver, behind teammate Marin Honda, in Zagreb, Croatia.

After repeating as the national junior champion, Higuchi edged Mao Asada by 1.6 points for the senior silver medal at the Japan Championships. In March, she competed at the World Junior Championships in Debrecen, Hungary. Ranked fifth in the short program and second in the free skate, she was awarded her second consecutive bronze medal, behind Honda and Maria Sotskova.

=== 2016–2017 season: Senior debut ===
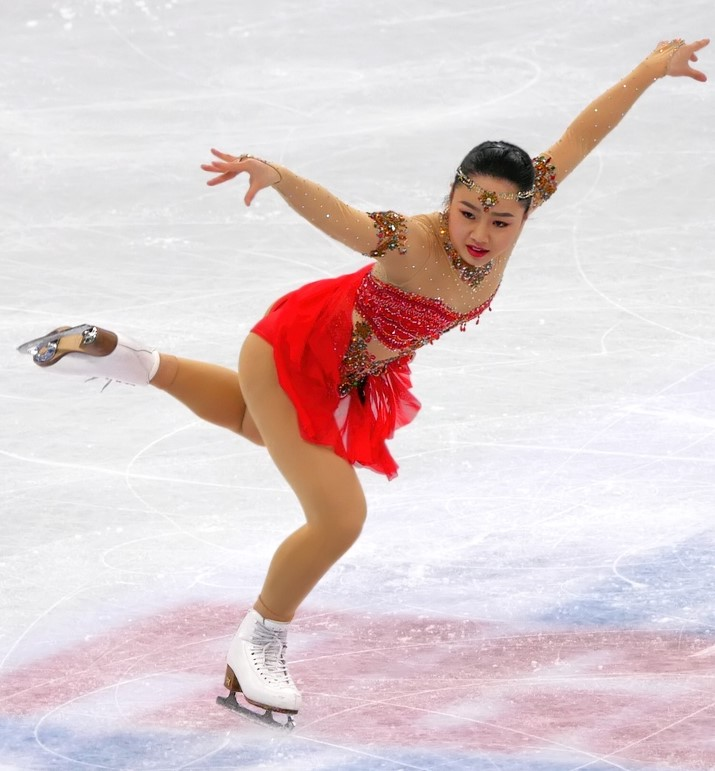
Higuchi performing her free skate at the 2017 World Championships

Making her senior international debut, Higuchi won gold at the 2016 CS Lombardia Trophy in Bergamo, Italy. She also competed at the 2016 Japan Open. She placed fifth in the individual event and first as a member of Team Japan in the team event. Higuchi's first Grand Prix event was the 2016 Trophée de France in Paris, France. She placed fifth in the short program, third in the free skate, and third overall. At her second Grand Prix event of the season, the 2016 NHK Trophy, Higuchi placed fifth in the short program, fourth in the free skate, and fourth overall.

At the 2016–17 Japan Championships, Higuchi placed third in the short program and fourth in the free skate but was still able to earn the silver medal behind Satoko Miyahara. She was assigned to compete at the 2017 Four Continents Championships and the 2017 World Championships. At the Four Continents Championships, she placed tenth in the short program, ninth in the free skate, and ninth overall. She placed ninth in the short program, twelfth in the free skate, and eleventh overall at the World Championships. Higuchi ended her season at the 2017 World Team Trophy. She earned three personal best scores at this competition, finishing fifth in the short program, third in the free skate, and third overall. She won the team event with Team Japan as well.

=== 2017–2018 season: World silver ===
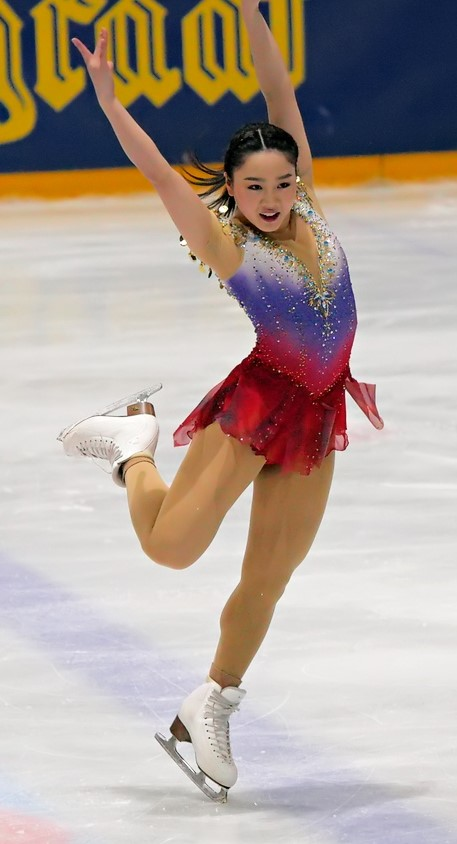
Higuchi performing her short program at the 2018 Challenge Cup

Higuchi competed at the 2017 Lombardia Trophy and scored new personal bests for the short program and combined total to win the silver medal. On the Grand Prix, Higuchi won the bronze medal at the 2017 Rostelecom Cup. She won the silver medal at the 2017 Cup of China. Her results qualified her for her first senior Grand Prix Final, held in Nagoya, Japan where she placed sixth overall.

At the 2017–18 Japan Figure Skating Championships, Higuchi finished fourth behind Satoko Miyahara, Kaori Sakamoto, and Rika Kihira.

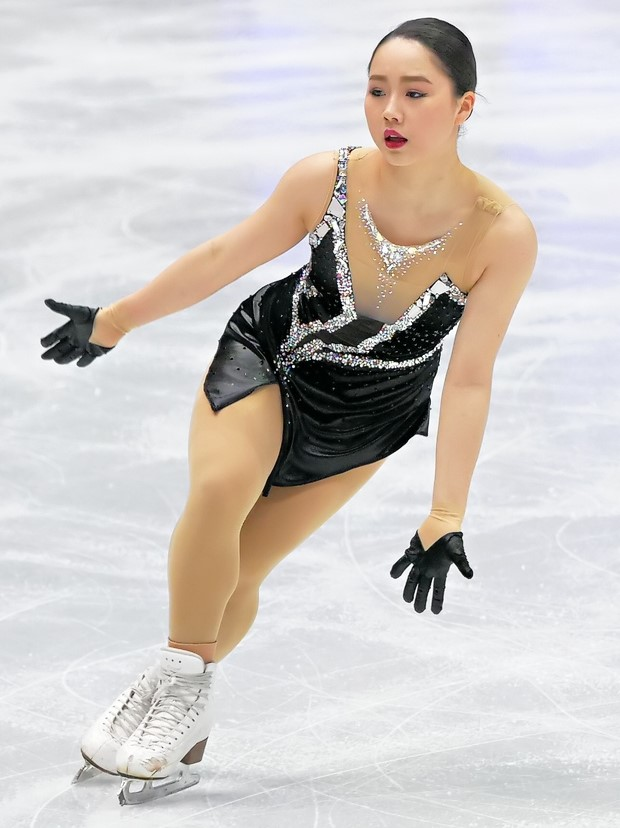
Higuchi during her free skate at the 2018 World Championships

She was not named to the Japanese Olympic team, but based on her international results throughout the season she was named to the 2018 World Championships team. She would subsequently win gold at the 2018 Challenge Cup at the end of February.

At the 2018 World Championships in Milan, Italy, Higuchi placed eighth in the short program and scored 65.89 points after falling on her combination. In the free skating, she performed a clean program, scoring 145.01 points to place second in that segment of the competition. She was the only skater that evening who did not receive a single negative grade of execution mark from the judges. She won the silver medal overall, finishing behind Kaetlyn Osmond and ahead of her compatriot Satoko Miyahara. Her free skating program, set to music from various James Bond films and choreographed by Shae-Lynn Bourne, was voted "the best ladies' free skate of the 2017–18 season" in a poll organized by the skating portal Ice Network.

=== 2018–2019 season: Injury struggles ===
Higuchi finished fifth at her first event of the season, the 2018 CS Autumn Classic International. In October, Japanese news media reported that she had injured the instep of her right foot. At her first Grand Prix assignment of the year, the 2018 Skate Canada International, she placed second in the short program, but several errors put her seventh in the free skate, and sixth overall. Higuchi then withdrew from the 2018 Rostelecom Cup, her second Grand Prix assignment for the year. She then proceeded to win Tokyo Regionals.

At the 2018 Japan Championships, she placed fourth in the short program and seventh in the free skate to place fifth overall. She would then finish the season by winning bronze at the 2019 Challenge Cup.

=== 2019–2020 season: Comeback ===
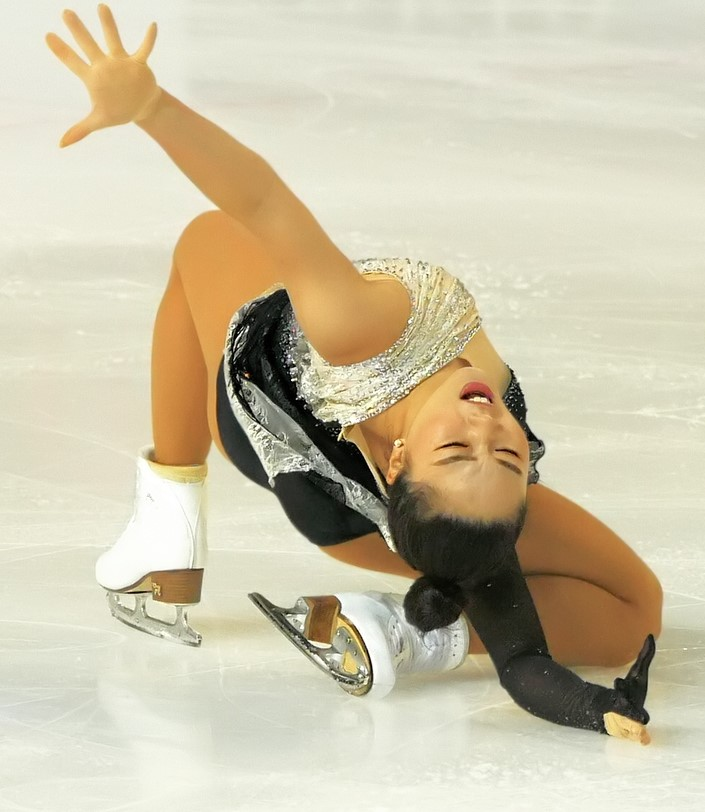
Higuchi during her short program at the 2019 Internationaux de France

Beginning the season at the 2019 CS Lombardia Trophy, Higuchi finished in eighth place after numerous errors. Proceeding to the Grand Prix series, her first assignment was the 2019 Skate America. Higuchi placed third in the short program, landing all her jumps cleanly in that segment, after which she described herself as "really happy to skate a clean program after a long time. I think it has been two years since I skated a program at this level." She struggled in the free skate, dropping to sixth place overall. She was sixth as well at the 2019 Internationaux de France.

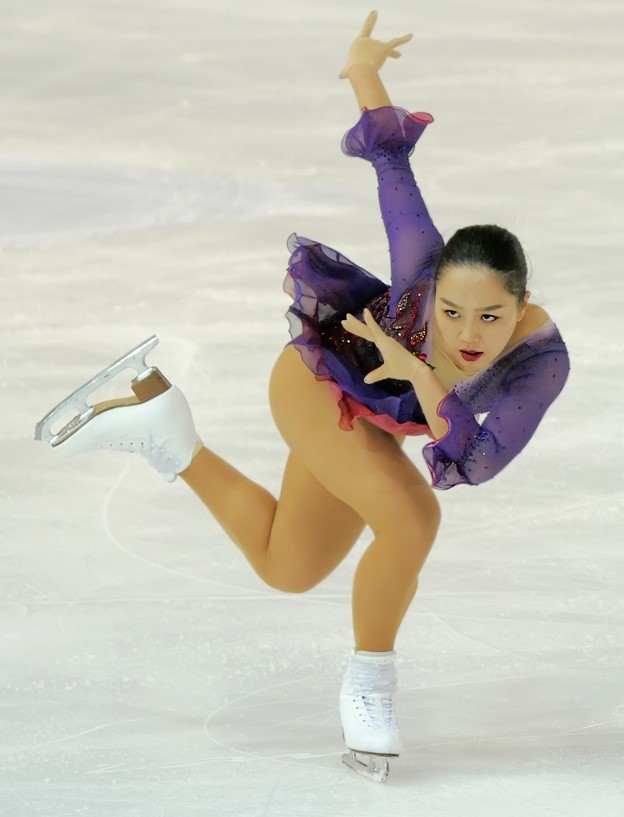
Higuchi performing her free skate at the 2019 Internationaux de France

Higuchi resumed training the triple Axel in the lead-up to the 2019–20 Japanese Championships, planning to attempt one in the free skate. She placed fourth in the short program, narrowly behind third-place Kaori Sakamoto, after stepping out of the second part of her jump combination and receiving a flip edge call. After being unable to land any triple Axels in the practice session before the free skate, she elected not to attempt it there and placed second in the segment behind Rika Kihira, taking the silver medal. Her only error in the segment was stepping out on a triple flip that was also given an edge call.

Competing at the 2020 Four Continents Championships, Higuchi placed fifth in the short program, the only issue being an edge call on her flip. In the free skate, she attempted the triple Axel in competition for the first time, rotating the jump successfully but falling on it. Higuchi also made a few other minor jump errors, placing fifth in the free segment for fourth place overall. She was then assigned to compete at the World Championships in Montreal, but these were cancelled as a result of the coronavirus pandemic.

=== 2020–2021 season ===
Higuchi competed at the 2020 Japan Open and finished second after Mako Yamashita with 123.01 points. She landed her triple Axel in the competition but stepped out on the landing edge. Competing domestically, she won the Eastern Sectionals by almost thirty points.

Higuchi began the international season at the 2020 NHK Trophy, where she won the silver medal, her first appearance on the ISU Grand Prix podium since the 2017–18 season. Higuchi came in second in the short program after she fell on her attempted triple Axel in the short program but landed all her other jumping passes. In the free skate, Higuchi landed the triple Axel as her opening element, albeit marked as landed on the quarter under rotation, but went on to double the planned triple Salchow and triple Lutz jumps. She was fourth in that segment of the competition but remained in second place behind Kaori Sakamoto. This marked the first podium she had stood on at a major international competition since winning silver at the 2018 World Championships.

Higuchi entered the 2020–21 Japan Championships as a favorite for the podium but placed thirteenth in the short program after falling on her triple Axel and executing only a double toe loop as the second part of her jump combination. Eighth in the free skate, she rose to seventh place overall.

=== 2021–2022 season: Beijing Olympics ===
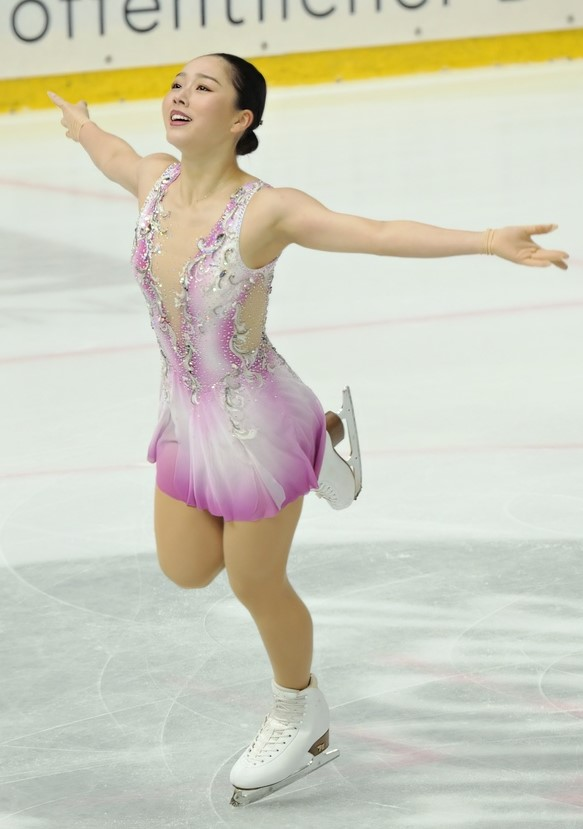
Higuchi performing her short program at the 2021 CS Cup of Austria

Higuchi began the season on the Grand Prix at the 2021 Skate Canada International, where she placed fifth in both programs and sixth overall. In the free skate, she landed a ratified triple Axel for the first time in international competition. At the 2021 CS Cup of Austria, she landed a ratified triple Axel in the short program for the first time internationally and set a new personal best after the segment. She struggled in the free skate, finishing fourth in that segment, but still won the gold medal, 5.36 points ahead of silver medalist Park Yeon-jeong. Competing the following weekend at her second Grand Prix, the 2021 Internationaux de France, Higuchi was sixth in the short program after singling her triple Axel attempt. She rallied in the free skate to place third in that segment and rise to the bronze medal position. She said afterward that her next goal was to "aim for 145 points and a perfect performance at Nationals".

With the 2021–22 Japan Championships serving as the final national qualification contest for the 2022 Winter Olympics, Higuchi placed second in both segments to take the silver medal. She did not attempt a triple Axel in the short program and landed it with a step out at the beginning of the free skate. She was named to the Japanese Olympic team, four years after missing it by one placement.

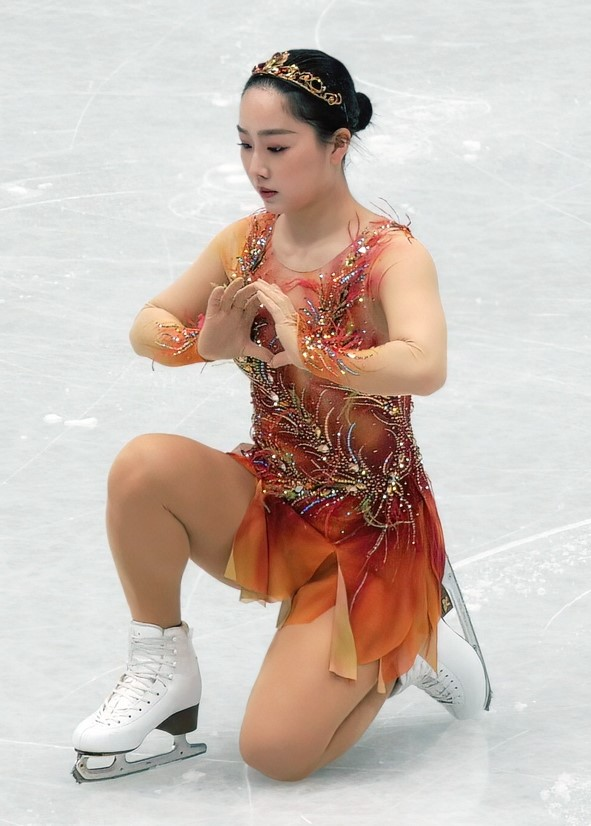
Higuchi during her free skate at the 2022 World Championships

Higuchi began the 2022 Winter Olympics as the Japanese entry in the women's short program segment of the Olympic team event. She opted not to attempt a triple Axel and skated a clean short program, finishing second in the segment and securing nine points for Japan. She did not skate in the free segment, which was given to national champion Kaori Sakamoto. Team Japan won bronze, Higuchi's first Olympic medal and the first podium finish for the country in that event. In the women's event, she landed a triple Axel cleanly but had two other triple jumps called as underrotated in addition to receiving an edge call on her flip, placing fifth with a score of 73.51. She said after that, "the score was not as high as I expected, and I think that is the only pity I had for this performance." Higuchi became the fifth woman to land a triple Axel at the Olympic Games. Sixth in the free skate, she remained fifth overall. She landed the triple Axel successfully again and said, "I had a bite of the bitter part of the Games, " in that she did not make the podium, "but also the sweet part of it. It's the best stepping stone for my athletic life in the next four years." Following the eventual disqualification of Kamila Valieva, Higuchi moved up by one placement in the women's singles event and she was declared as the fourth woman to land a triple Axel at the Olympic Games rather than the fifth one.

Days after the Olympics concluded, Vladimir Putin ordered an invasion of Ukraine, as a result of which the International Skating Union banned all Russian and Belarusian skaters from competing at the 2022 World Championships. This had a major impact on the women's field, which Russians dominated for most of the preceding eight years. As a result, Higuchi entered the championships considered a major medal contender. In the short program, she doubled and stepped out of an attempted triple Axel and received an edge call on her triple flip, finishing seventh in the segment. Twelfth in the free skate, she finished eleventh overall.

Higuchi sustained a stress fracture in her right shin in late April 2022.

=== 2022–2023 season: Stress fracture and other struggles ===
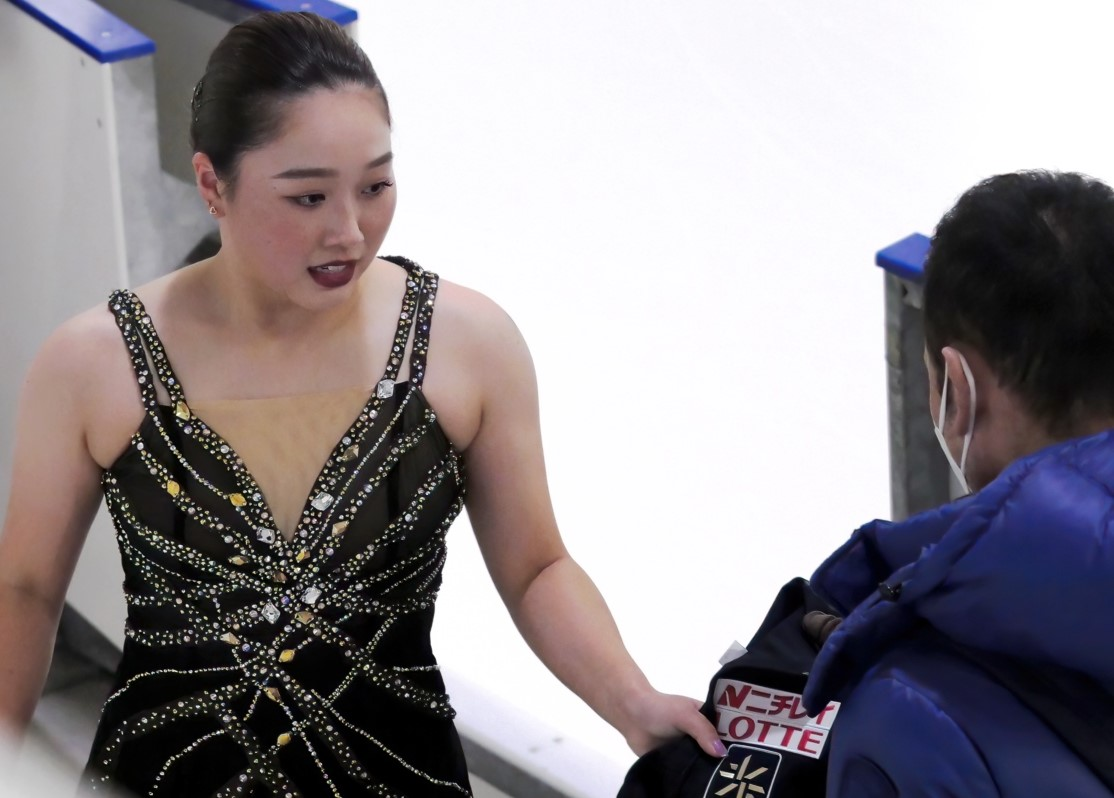
Higuchi at the 2022 CS Lombardia Trophy

Competing at the 2022 CS Lombardia Trophy, Higuchi finished ninth.

Due to the stress fracture, Higuchi withdrew from both of her Grand Prix events – the 2022 Skate Canada International and 2022 NHK Trophy – and stated that she would miss the entire season. In 2024, Higuchi gave a more detailed explanation for her decision, saying, "I chose to take a break because of the injury and my mental state was just unbearable… I thought I would just fade away instead of just resting, so coming back was a surprise even to myself."

In May 2023, Higuchi announced that she intended to return to competition the following season.

=== 2023–2024 season: Returning from injury and receiving Beijing Team Olympic medal ===
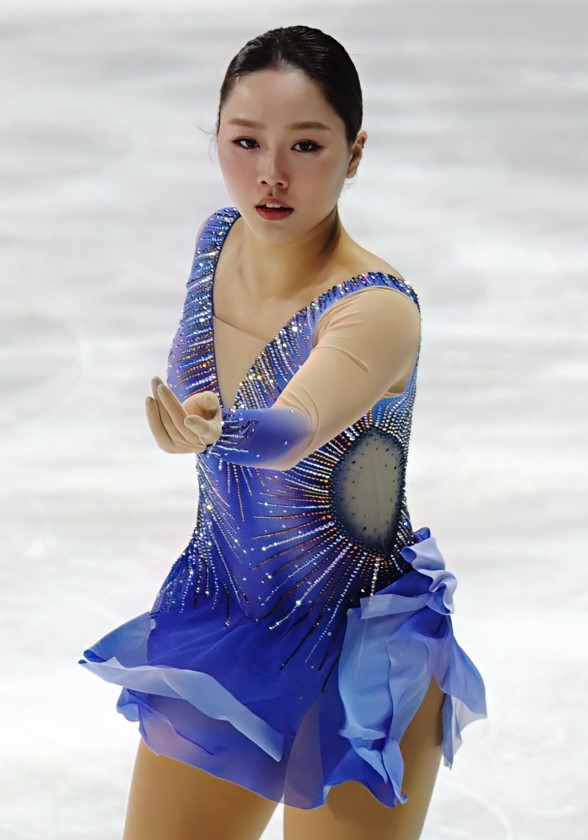
Higuchi performing her free program at the 2023 Grand Prix de France

For her free program music, Higuchi selected Coldplay's "Fix You" and "Paradise", inspired by the American ice dancers Maia and Alex Shibutani's 2018 Olympic free dance. She explained that " it’s a song that links the many things I felt during my break, and what I feel towards skating right now."

Making her return to international competition on the Grand Prix at the 2023 Grand Prix de France in Angers, Higuchi came fifth. She expressed gratitude for the crowd, noting "every time I come to France a lot of people cheer for me. Although it's been two years before this competition, I received support from many people and was able to skate while having a lot of fun." Eleventh in the short program at the 2023 NHK Trophy, she attempted the triple Axel for the first time in the free skate, falling on it. She revealed afterward that she had been unable to land it in practice but "if I managed to hit it, it would connect to better results." She finished ninth overall, and said she felt it had been "a good performance."

Higuchi came in twelfth at the 2023–24 Japan Championships.

During the 2024 Paris Olympics, a medal ceremony was held for Higuchi and her teammates from the 2022 Olympic Figure Skating Team Event, where they were awarded their Olympic silver medals.

=== 2024–2025: Grand Prix gold medal and Grand Prix Final ===
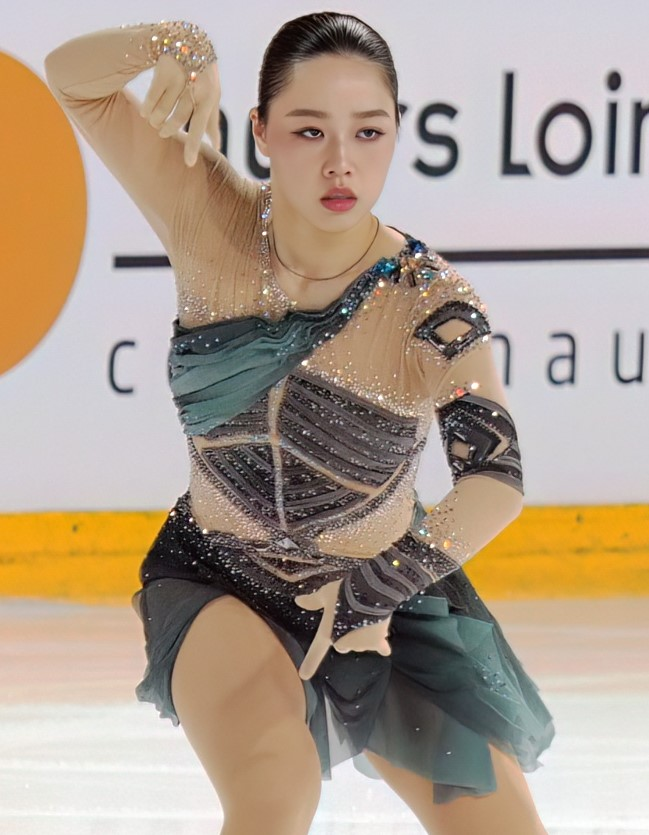
Higuchi performing her short program at the 2024 Grand Prix de France

Beginning her season at 2024 Skate America, Higuchi placed fourth in the short program but won the free skate, unexpectedly taking the gold over expected favorite, Isabeau Levito. In the winner's interview following the event, Higuchi said, "This is the first time in my life that I've won a Grand Prix competition, so I'm really surprised, but I'm also very happy." The competition was Higuchi's fourteenth event on the Grand Prix series and the first time she had ever won a Grand Prix title. While the skater was not satisfied with the free skate, she was “super happy” and “surprised” with the outcome. “I felt the strongest back then at the beginning of my Grand Prix career,” said Higuchi. “Back then, I was aiming for golds and never won an event, so I really wasn't expecting to win this event."

Two weeks later, Higuchi competed at the 2024 Grand Prix de France. Although she placed third in the short program, she would win the free skate with a free skate score nearly ten points higher than what she got at Skate America. She would finish second overall behind Amber Glenn. With these Grand Prix results, Higuchi qualified for the Grand Prix Final for the first time since 2017. During the gala exhibition at the 2024 NHK Trophy, all members of the 2022 Olympic Team Event, including Higuchi, were invited to center stage, wearing their Olympic costumes and Olympic medals, in celebration of their achievement.

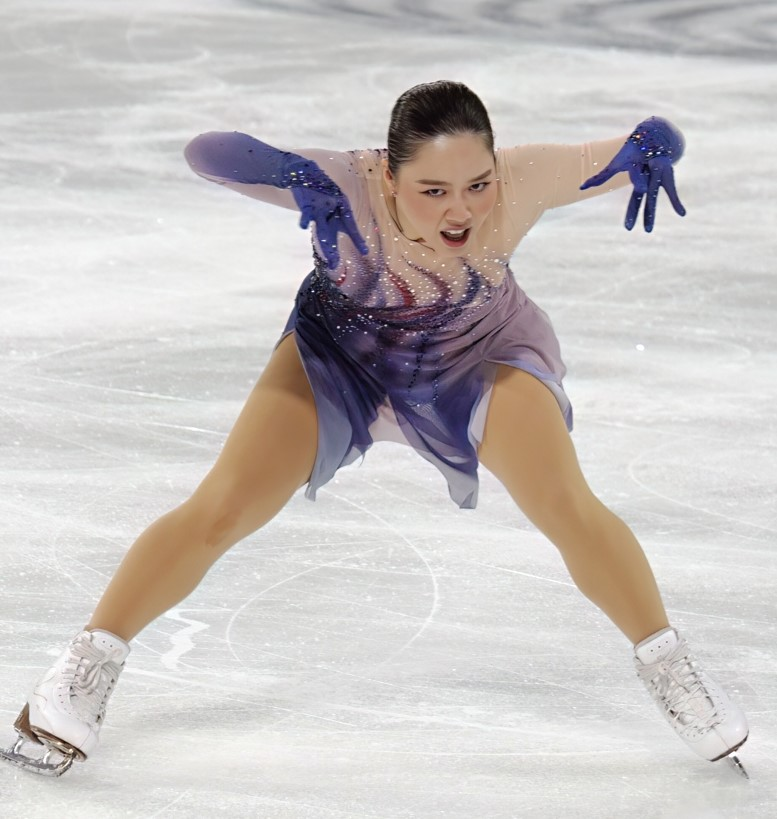
Higuchi performing her free skate at the 2024 Grand Prix de France

At the Final, Higuchi would place sixth in the short program after falling on an attempted triple lutz and failing to perform a jump combination. She would, however, deliver a solid free skate, placing fourth in that segment and moving up to fourth place overall. After the free skate, she said: “I focused on doing my best for the competition, so it helped me to calm down. I was calmer than yesterday, so I was able to skate as I had practiced."

Two weeks later, Higuchi won the bronze medal at the 2024–25 Japan Championships. With this result, she was named to both the Four Continents and World teams.

Going on to compete at the 2025 Four Continents Championships in late February, Higuchi placed seventh in the short program after stepping out of a planned triple lutz and landing her triple toe at the end of her triple flip-triple toe combination on the quarter. During the free skate, Higuchi fell on her second triple lutz attempt but otherwise delivered a solid performance, placing fifth in that segment and moving up to fifth place overall, making her the highest ranked Japanese woman at the event.

The following month, Higuchi competed at the 2025 World Championships in Boston, Massachusetts, United States. She skated a clean short program, earning a season's best and placing fourth in that competition segment. She also went on to deliver a solid free skate with her only major mistake being a slight step out on her second triple loop attempt. Placing sixth in that competition segment, Higuchi would also finish the event in sixth place overall. In an interview following the event, she shared, "I was not able to compete at Worlds in the last 2 years. So coming to a big event was one of my big goals in this season. I think I was able to give the performance I was hoping for, so I’m happy. Unfortunately, the score was a bit lower than I expected, so I need to check the detailed judging sheet and make improvements for the next season."

=== 2025–2026 season: Injury and retirement ===
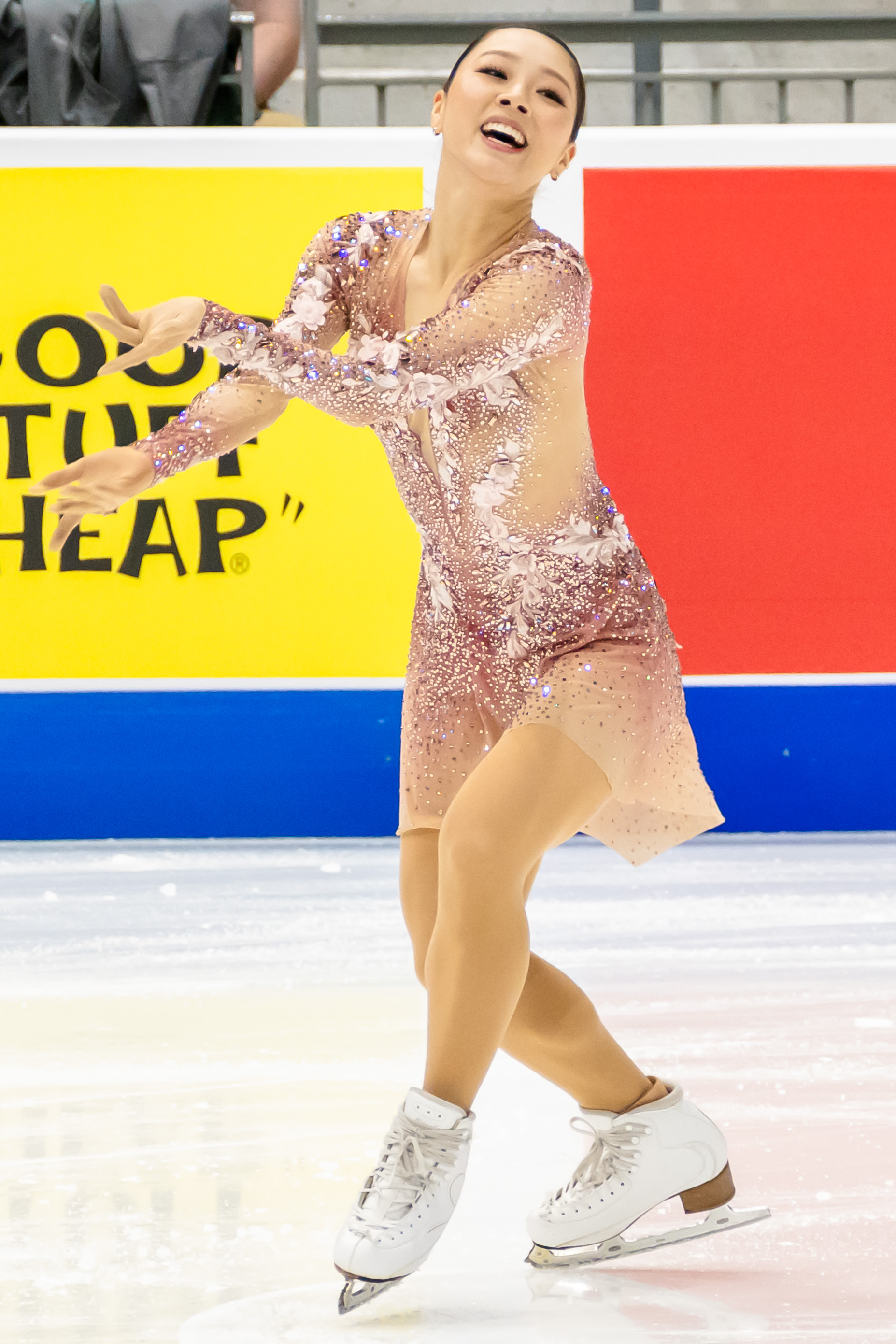
Higuchi performing her short program at 2025 Skate America

In June, Higuchi announced that she planned to retire from competitive figure skating at the end of the season. During the process of creating her short program, choreographer, Jeffrey Buttle, presented Higuchi with the idea of skating to "My Way", a song that he had previously wanted to skate to during his final season as a competitive figure skater. Higuchi, feeling that the song's lyrics perfectly reflected her years as an elite figure skater and her desire to close out her figure skating career on a high note, agreed to it.

She began the season in September by competing at the 2025 CS Kinoshita Group Cup. Higuchi placed sixth in the short program after only performing a triple-double jump combination as opposed to a planned triple-triple, and taking an unexpected fall during her step sequence.

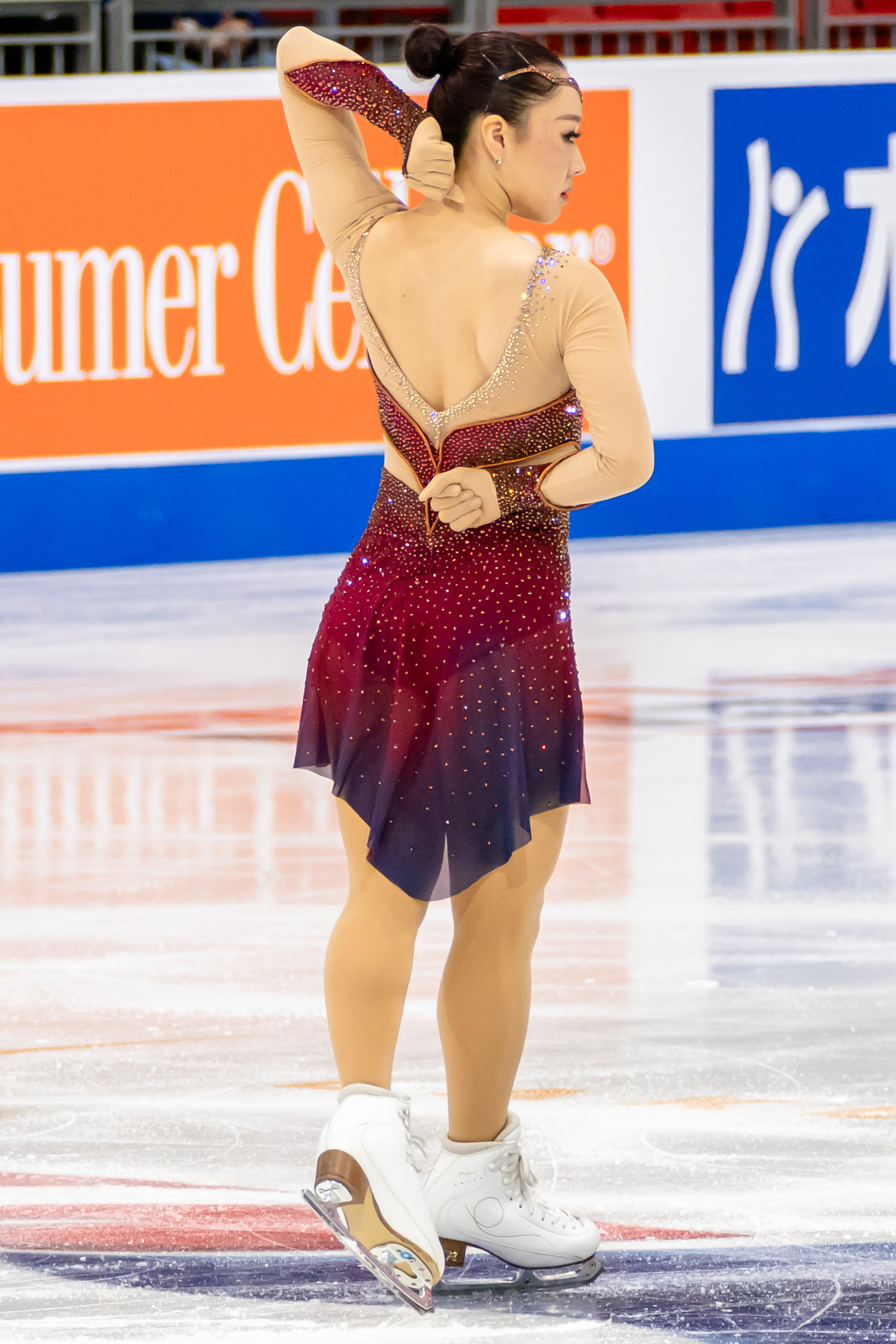
Higuchi performing her free skate at 2025 Skate America

Prior to the free skate, Higuchi fell ill and as a result struggled throughout the performance, only placing eleventh overall. She subsequently withdrew from the 2025 CS Trialeti Trophy due to her to beginning to experience pain in her foot.

The following month, during the 2025 NHK Trophy, Higuchi continued to experience pain and as such had to take painkillers as a means of coping. As such, Higuchi struggled with her jumps throughout the event and finished in ninth place overall. The following week, she finished eleventh at 2025 Skate America.

In December, Higuchi competed at her final Japan Championships, where she delivered two solid programs and finished in eighth place overall. Following the event, she expressed satisfaction, saying, "I think I was able to perform the best performances I've ever done in both the short and free programs... When they called my name, it was the loudest voice I'd ever heard. It made me feel so glad that I'd worked so hard. Even when it seemed like I couldn't give up, I kept going because I didn't want it to end there. I always had a strong determination not to give up. Even when the pain in my leg wouldn't go away, my doctor told me, 'Don't give up, keep trying,' and that helped me persevere for a month. Right now I'm filled with gratitude."

On March 9, 2026, Higuchi officially announced her retirement from competitive figure skating.

== Programs ==
=== Post-Competitive Career Programs ===
Season	Exhibition
2026–2027	A Hazy Shade of Winter performed by Sarah Cothran, choreo. by Shae-Lynn Bourne

=== Competitive Programs ===
Competition and exhibition programs by season
Season	Short program	Free skate program	Exhibition program
2011–12	"Charlie Chaplin Medley": 1. Limelight; From Limelight; Performed by The Film Studio Orchestra; 2. Green Lantern Rag; From A Dog's Life; Performed by Stanley Black; Composed by Charlie Chaplin; Choreo. by Noriko Sato, Nanami Abe	"Don Quixote": 1. Quiteria's Variation; 2. The Queen of the Dryads; 3. Quiteria and Basilio; Composed by Ludwig Minkus; Performed by Nayden Todorov, Sofia National Opera Orchestra; Choreo. by Noriko Sato, Nanami Abe	—N/a
2012–13	"Charlie Chaplin Medley"	"Don Quixote"	—N/a
2013–14	"Kanashimi no Czardas": Composed by Vittorio Monti; Performed by Iwao Furusawa; Choreo. by Noriko Sato	"Don Quixote"	"Kanashimi no Czardas"
2014–15	"Kanashimi no Czardas"	"Piano Concerto in F": Composed by George Gershwin; Choreo. by Nanami Abe	"Somewhere Only We Know": Performed by Lily Allen
2015–16	"Mambo Medley": 1. Mambo Fantasy; Composed by Aldemaro Romero; 2. Mambo No. 8; Composed by Pérez Prado; Choreo. by Nanami Abe	"The Mask of Zorro": 1. The Plaza of Execution; 2. Elena and Esperanza; 3. The Fencing Lesson; 4. Tornado In the Barracks; Composed by James Horner; Choreo. by Noriko Sato	"You Can't Stop the Beat": From Hairspray; Performed by Nikki Blonsky, Zac Efron, Amanda Bynes, Elijah Kelley, Queen Latifah
2015–16	"Mambo Medley": 1. Mambo Fantasy; Composed by Aldemaro Romero; 2. Mambo No. 8; Composed by Pérez Prado; Choreo. by Nanami Abe	"The Mask of Zorro": 1. The Plaza of Execution; 2. Elena and Esperanza; 3. The Fencing Lesson; 4. Tornado In the Barracks; Composed by James Horner; Choreo. by Noriko Sato	"All About That Bass": Performed by Meghan Trainor; Choreo. by Shae-Lynn Bourne
2016–17	"La cena": From La califfa; Composed by Ennio Morricone; Choreo. by Shae-Lynn Bourne	"Scheherazade": 1. The Tale of the Kalendar Prince; 2. The Young Prince and the Young Princess; 3. The Sea and Sinbad's Ship; Composed by Nikolai Rimsky-Korsakov; Choreo. by Massimo Scali	"Byakuya wo Iku": From Byakuyakō; Composed by Shin Kono; Choreo. by Nanami Abe
2017–18	"Gypsy Dance": From Don Quixote; Composed by Ludwig Minkus; Choreo. by Massimo Scali	"James Bond Medley": 1. Komodo Dragon; From Skyfall; Composed by Thomas Newman; 2. Girl Trouble; From From Russia with Love; Composed by John Barry; 3. Skyfall; From Skyfall; Performed by Adele; Choreo. by Shae-Lynn Bourne	"Byakuya wo Iku"
2017–18	"Gypsy Dance": From Don Quixote; Composed by Ludwig Minkus; Choreo. by Massimo Scali	"James Bond Medley": 1. Komodo Dragon; From Skyfall; Composed by Thomas Newman; 2. Girl Trouble; From From Russia with Love; Composed by John Barry; 3. Skyfall; From Skyfall; Performed by Adele; Choreo. by Shae-Lynn Bourne	"Hallelujah": Performed by Pentatonix; Choreo. by Lisa Mochizuki
2018–19	"Energia": Performed by SOFI TUKKER; Choreo. by Shae-Lynn Bourne	"Hymne à l'amour": Composed by Marguerite Monnot; Choreo. by Yuka Sato	"Hallelujah"
2018–19	—N/a	"The Four Seasons": Composed by Antonio Vivaldi; Choreo. by Shae-Lynn Bourne	"Michael Jackson Medley": 1. Billie Jean; 2. Don't Stop 'Til You Get Enough; 3. HIStory; 4. Smooth Criminal; Performed by Michael Jackson; Choreo. by Benoît Richaud
2018–19	—N/a	"James Bond Medley"	"Oblivion": Performed by Astor Piazzolla
2019–20	"Bird Set Free": Performed by Sia; Choreo. by Shae-Lynn Bourne	"Poeta": 1. Poeta en el Puerto; 2. Nada Puede Dormir; 3. Poeta en el mar 4. Poeta en el viento; Composed by Vicente Amigo; 5. Barrio San Miguel; Composed by Gino D'Auri; Choreo. by Massimo Scali	"And I Am Telling You I'm Not Going": From Dreamgirls; Performed by Jennifer Hudson; Choreo. by Jeffrey Buttle
2020–21	"Bird Set Free"	"Poeta"	"OMG": Performed by SUSHIBOYS; Choreo. by Misao Sato
2021–22	"Your Song": Performed by Ellie Goulding; Choreo. by Shae-Lynn Bourne	"The Lion King": 1. Spirit; Performed by Beyoncé; 2. Grasslands Chant; 3. Stampede; 4. Remember; Composed by Hans Zimmer; Choreo. by Shae-Lynn Bourne	"Primavera": Composed by Ludovico Einaudi; Choreo. by Jeffrey Buttle
2022–23	"Never Tear Us Apart": From Fifty Shades Freed; Performed by Bishop Briggs; Choreo. by Shae-Lynn Bourne	"Spanish Medley": 1. "Hable con Ella"; 2. Creditos; From La piel que habito; Composed by Alberto Iglesias; 3. "Le di a la caza alcance"; Composed by Michael Nyman; Performed by Estrella Morente; Choreo. by Shae-Lynn Bourne	—N/a
2023–24	"Never Tear Us Apart"	"Coldplay Medley": 1. Fix You; 2. Paradise; Performed by Coldplay; Choreo. by Shae-Lynn Bourne	"Love on the Brain": Performed by Madilyn Bailey
2024–25	"Dune": 1. Herald of the Change; 2. I See You in My Dreams; From Dune; 3. Harvester Attack; From Dune: Part Two; Composed by Hans Zimmer; Choreo. by Jeffrey Buttle	Medley: 1. Nature Boy; From Alien: Covenant; Performed by AURORA; 2. Running Up That Hill; From Stranger Things; Performed by Kate Bush, Samuel Kim, Krutikov Music; Choreo. by Shae-Lynn Bourne	"Primavera"
2025–26	"My Way": Performed by Chris Mann; Choreo. by Jeffrey Buttle	"Wonder Woman": 1. Wonder Woman Main Theme; From Wonder Woman; Composed by Tina Guo; 2. The Blue Planet; From Blue Planet II; Composed by Jacob Shea, Hans Zimmer, David Fleming, George Fenton; 3. Themyscira; From Wonder Woman 1984; Composed by Hans Zimmer; Choreo. by Shae-Lynn Bourne	"AVA": Performed by Garmiani

== Competitive highlights ==
=== Senior results ===
- GP – Event of the ISU Grand Prix Series
- JGP – Event of the ISU Junior Grand Prix Series
- CS – Event of the ISU Challenger Series
- TBD – Assigned
- WD – Withdraw
- C – Cancelled
- Medals at team events are awarded for the team results only. Individual placements at team events are listed in parentheses.

Competition placements at senior level
Season	2014–15	2015–16	2016–17	2017–18	2018–19	2019–20	2020–21	2021–22	2022–23	2023–24	2024–25	2025–26
Winter Olympics								4th				
Winter Olympics (Team event)								2nd (1st)				
World Championships			11th	2nd		C		11th			6th	
Four Continents Championships			9th			4th					5th	
Grand Prix Final				6th							4th	
Japan Championships	3rd	2nd	2nd	4th	5th	2nd	7th	2nd		12th	3rd	8th
World Team Trophy			1st (3rd)									
GP Cup of China				2nd								
GP France			3rd			6th		3rd		5th	2nd	
GP NHK Trophy			4th				2nd		WD	9th		9th
GP Rostelecom Cup				3rd	WD							
GP Skate America						6th					1st	11th
GP Skate Canada					6th			6th	WD			
CS Autumn Classic					5th							
CS Cup of Austria								1st				
CS Kinoshita Group Cup												11th
CS Lombardia Trophy			1st	2nd		8th			9th			
Challenge Cup				1st	3rd							
Japan Open			1st (5th)				1st (2nd)	1st (1st)				

=== Junior results ===
Competition placements at junior level
Season	2012–13	2013–14	2014–15	2015–16
World Junior Championships			3rd	3rd
Junior Grand Prix Final			3rd	
Japan Championships	7th	8th	1st	1st
JGP Austria				5th
JGP Croatia				2nd
JGP Czech Republic			2nd	
JGP Germany			1st	
Asian Open Trophy			1st	

== Detailed results ==
ISU personal best scores in the +5/-5 GOE System
Segment	Type	Score	Event
Total	TSS	214.44	2022 Olympics
Short program	TSS	79.73	2021 CS Cup of Austria
Short program	TES	46.25	2021 CS Cup of Austria
Short program	PCS	34.19	2022 Olympics Team Event
Free skating	TSS	141.04	2021 Internationaux de France
Free skating	TES	73.80	2021 Internationaux de France
Free skating	PCS	69.26	2022 Winter Olympics

ISU personal best scores in the +3/-3 GOE System
Segment	Type	Score	Event
Total	TSS	217.63	2017 CS Lombardia Trophy
Short program	TSS	74.26	2017 CS Lombardia Trophy
Short program	TES	40.86	2017 CS Lombardia Trophy
Short program	PCS	34.18	2017 Grand Prix Final
Free skating	TSS	145.30	2017 World Team Trophy
Free skating	TES	75.65	2017 World Team Trophy
Free skating	PCS	70.29	2018 World Championships

=== Senior level ===
Results in the 2025–26 season
Date	Event	SP		FS		Total	
Date	Event	P	Score	P	Score	P	Score
Sep 5–7, 2025	(Japan) 2025 CS Kinoshita Group Cup	6	59.43	11	99.70	11	159.13
Nov 7–9, 2025	(Japan) 2025 NHK Trophy	10	53.15	8	115.12	9	168.27
Nov 14–16, 2025	(United States) 2025 Skate America	8	60.12	11	99.28	11	159.40
Dec 18–21, 2025	2025–26 Japan Championships	8	69.47	8	133.59	8	203.06

Results in the 2024–25 season
Date	Event	SP		FS		Total	
Date	Event	P	Score	P	Score	P	Score
Oct 18–20, 2024	(United States) 2024 Skate America	4	66.12	1	130.81	1	196.93
Nov 1–3, 2024	2024 Grand Prix de France	3	66.98	1	139.10	2	206.08
Dec 5–8, 2024	(France) 2024–25 Grand Prix Final	6	61.61	4	134.35	4	195.96
Dec 19–22, 2024	2024–25 Japan Championships	4	71.05	3	135.35	3	206.40
Feb 19–23, 2025	(South Korea) 2025 Four Continents Championships	7	65.10	5	130.06	5	195.16
Mar 25–30, 2025	(United States) 2025 World Championships	4	72.10	6	132.48	6	204.58

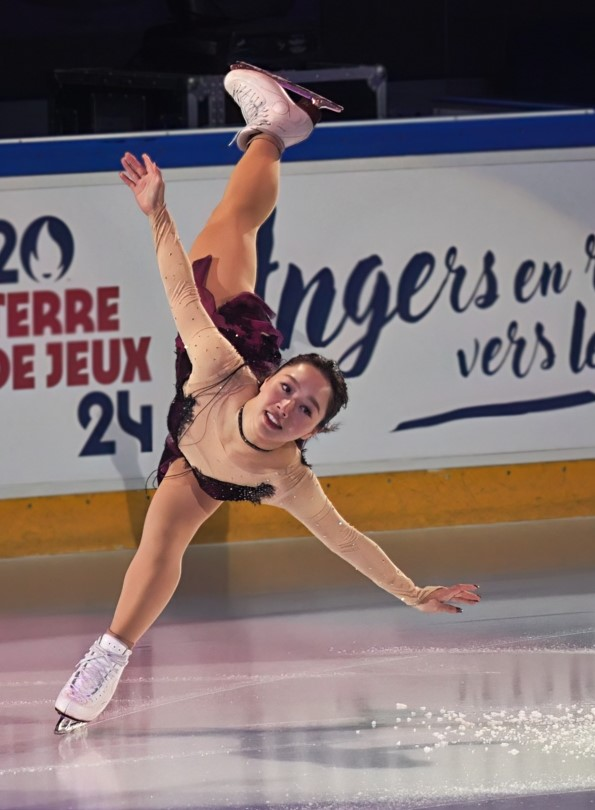
Higuchi performing a spiral during the gala at the 2023 Grand Prix de France

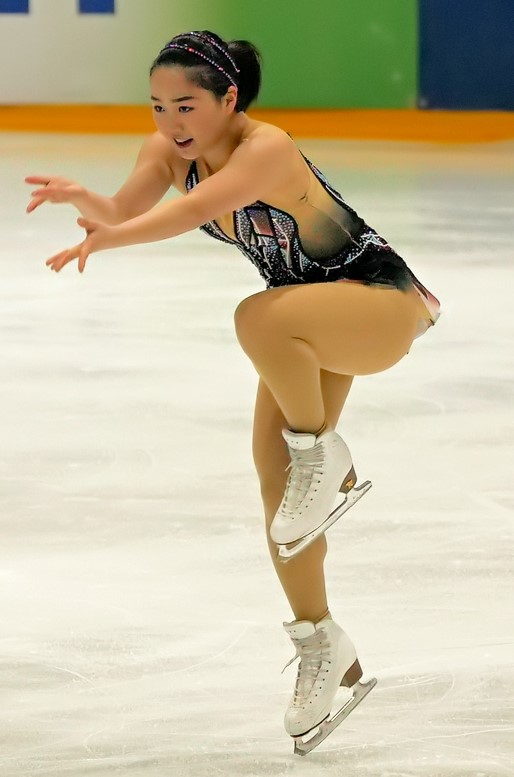
Higuchi performing her short program at the 2019 Challenge Cup

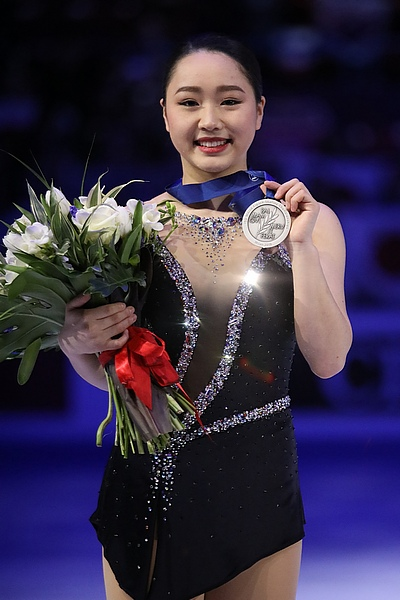
Higuchi at the 2018 World Championships

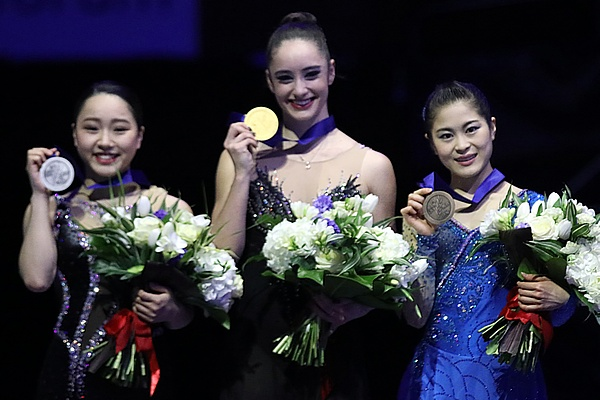
Higuchi (left) and Kaetlyn Osmond (center) and Satoko Miyahara (right) at the 2018 World Championships podium

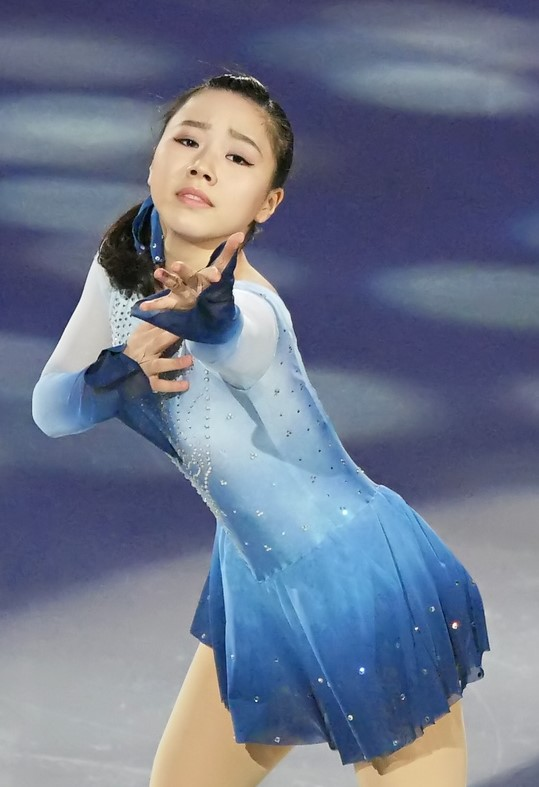
Higuchi during the exhibition gala at the 2016 Trophée de France

2023–2024 season
Date	Event	SP	FS	Total
December 20–24, 2023	2023–24 Japan Championships	15; 57.97	11; 122.70	12; 180.67
November 24–26, 2023	2023 NHK Trophy	11; 52.18	8; 113.51	9; 165.69
November 3–5, 2023	2023 Grand Prix de France	6; 60.29	4; 129.73	5; 190.02
2022–23 season
Date	Event	SP	FS	Total
September 16–19, 2022	2022 CS Lombardia Trophy	5; 57.75	11; 92.45	9; 150.20
2021–22 season
Date	Event	SP	FS	Total
March 21–27, 2022	2022 World Championships	7; 67.03	12; 121.12	11; 188.15
February 15–17, 2022	2022 Winter Olympics	4; 73.51	5; 140.93	4; 214.44
February 4–7, 2022	2022 Winter Olympics (Team event)	2; 74.73	—	2T
December 22–26, 2021	2021–22 Japan Championships	2; 74.66	2; 147.12	2; 221.78
November 19–21, 2021	2021 Internationaux de France	6; 63.87	3; 141.04	3; 204.91
November 11–14, 2021	2021 CS Cup of Austria	1; 79.73	4; 109.70	1; 189.43
October 29–31, 2021	2021 Skate Canada International	5; 69.41	5; 135.86	6; 205.27
October 3, 2021	2021 Japan Open	–	1; 136.27	1T
2020–21 season
Date	Event	SP	FS	Total
December 24–27, 2020	2020–21 Japan Championships	13; 61.53	8; 133.51	7; 195.04
November 27–29, 2020	2020 NHK Trophy	2; 69.71	4; 131.27	2; 200.98
2019–20 season
Date	Event	SP	FS	Total
February 4–9, 2020	2020 Four Continents Championships	5; 72.95	5; 134.51	4; 207.46
December 18–22, 2019	2019–20 Japan Championships	4; 68.10	2; 138.51	2; 206.61
November 1–3, 2019	2019 Internationaux de France	5; 64.78	7; 109.34	6; 174.12
October 18–20, 2019	2019 Skate America	3; 71.76	6; 109.56	6; 181.32
September 13–15, 2019	2019 CS Lombardia Trophy	9; 52.33	8; 112.04	8; 164.37
2018–19 season
Date	Event	SP	FS	Total
February 21–24, 2019	2019 Challenge Cup	4; 62.70	2; 123.54	3; 186.24
December 20–24, 2018	2018–19 Japan Championships	4; 72.63	7; 125.00	5; 197.63
October 26–28, 2018	2018 Skate Canada International	2; 66.51	7; 114.78	6; 181.29
September 20–22, 2018	2018 CS Autumn Classic International	4; 57.54	5; 109.47	5; 167.01
2017–18 season
Date	Event	SP	FS	Total
March 19–25, 2018	2018 World Championships	8; 65.89	2; 145.01	2; 210.90
February 22–25, 2018	2018 Challenge Cup	1; 69.25	1; 134.69	1; 203.94
December 21–24, 2017	2017–18 Japan Championships	4; 68.93	5; 138.03	4; 206.96
December 7–10, 2017	2017–18 Grand Prix Final	5; 73.26	6; 128.85	6; 202.11
November 3–5, 2017	2017 Cup of China	2; 70.53	2; 141.99	2; 212.52
October 20–22, 2017	2017 Rostelecom Cup	3; 69.60	3; 137.57	3; 207.17
September 14–17, 2017	2017 CS Lombardia Trophy	1; 74.26	2; 143.37	2; 217.63
2016–17 season
Date	Event	SP	FS	Total
April 20–23, 2017	2017 World Team Trophy	5; 71.41	3; 145.30	1T/3P; 216.71
Mar. 29 – Apr. 2, 2017	2017 World Championships	9; 65.87	12; 122.18	11; 188.05
February 15–19, 2017	2017 Four Continents Championships	10; 58.83	9; 113.22	9; 172.05
December 22–25, 2016	2016–17 Japan Championships	3; 68.74	4; 130.75	2; 199.49
November 25–27, 2016	2016 NHK Trophy	5; 62.58	4; 122.81	4; 185.39
November 11–13, 2016	2016 Trophée de France	5; 65.02	3; 129.46	3; 194.48
November 4–6, 2016	2016 Japan Eastern Sectional Championships	1; 53.58	1; 124.46	1; 178.04
October 1, 2016	2016 Japan Open	–	5; 116.99	1T/5P
September 8–11, 2016	2016 CS Lombardia Trophy	1; 66.66	3; 112.20	1; 178.86
2015–16 season
Date	Event	SP	FS	Total
December 24–27, 2015	2015–16 Japan Championships	3; 67.48	3; 127.87	2; 195.35
2014–15 season
Date	Event	SP	FS	Total
December 26–28, 2014	2014–15 Japan Championships	3; 64.35	3; 117.47	3; 181.82

=== Junior level ===
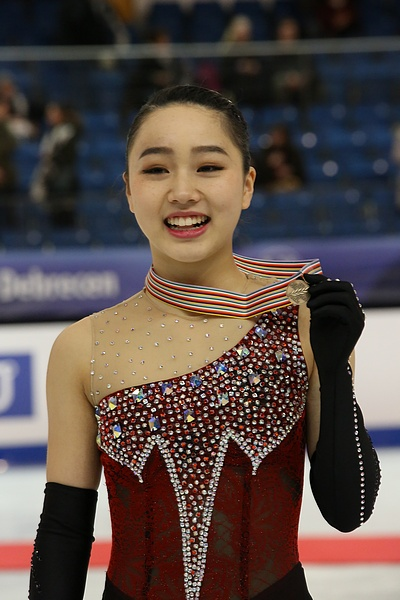
Higuchi on the podium at the 2016 World Junior Championships

2015–16 season
Date	Event	SP	FS	Total
March 14–20, 2016	2016 World Junior Championships	5; 58.08	2; 125.65	3; 183.73
November 21–23, 2015	2015–16 Japan Junior Championships	1; 66.83	1; 122.40	1; 189.23
October 7–11, 2015	2015 JGP Croatia	1; 60.77	2; 114.29	2; 175.06
September 10–13, 2015	2015 JGP Austria	8; 46.55	4; 110.24	5; 156.79
2014–15 season
Date	Event	SP	FS	Total
March 2–8, 2015	2015 World Junior Championships	3; 61.27	2; 124.30	3; 185.27
December 11–14, 2014	2014–15 JGP Final	5; 60.37	3; 117.72	3; 178.09
November 17–18, 2014	2014–15 Japan Junior Championships	1; 63.98	1; 123.97	1; 187.95
October 1–4, 2014	2014 JGP Germany	1; 58.99	1; 117.15	1; 176.14
September 3–6, 2014	2014 JGP Czech Skate	5; 52.75	1; 116.93	2; 169.68
August 7–10, 2014	2014 Asian Trophy	2; 57.05	1; 109.85	1; 166.90
2013–14 season
Date	Event	SP	FS	Total
November 22–24, 2013	2013–14 Japan Junior Championships	19; 42.37	6; 100.44	8; 142.81
2012–13 season
Date	Event	SP	FS	Total
November 17–18, 2012	2012–13 Japan Junior Championships	6; 51.20	9; 91.88	7; 143.08
