= Dmitrij Dmitrij =

EP by Oh No Oh My
- Released: October 21, 2008
- Genre: Indie rock
- Length: 17:55

Oh No Oh My chronology
| Oh No! Oh My! (2006) | Dmitrij Dmitrij (2008) | People Problems (2011) |

Dmitrij Dmitrij is an EP by indie rock band Oh No Oh My. It was named after their friend and European driver Dmitrij Rogovik.

== Track listing ==
1. "Wham Bam Thank You Spaceman" - (4:03)
2. "The Boy With An Anchor" - (3:35)
3. "Be A Star" - (3:05)
4. "Go To Work" - (3:05)
5. "I Painted Your House" - (4:07)
