= Ryland Bouchard =

American vocalist and musician

- Birth name: Ryland Louis Bouchard
- Born: October 16, 1979 (age 45) Los Angeles, California
- Genres: Folk, Electronic, Experimental music, art rock, indie, folk
- Occupation(s): Musician, Cinematographer
- Instrument(s): Vocals guitar woodwinds synthesizers piano electronics percussion
- Years active: 2002–present
- Labels: Swim Slowly Records; 5 Rue Christine; Kill Rock Stars
- Members: Ryland Bouchard
- Website: www.rylandbouchard.com

Ryland Louis Bouchard (born October 16, 1979) is an American vocalist, musician, and cinematographer. As a musician he has incorporated aspects of folk, electronica, jazz, psychedelia and avant-garde rock. Previously known as the Kill Rock Stars recording artist The Robot Ate Me, he has been labeled by Daytrotter as "One of the most creative and potentially scary minds of our generation" and by Spin Magazine as "purely artistic, baffling, and almost completely uncommercial".

== Biography ==
Bouchard was born on October 16, 1979, in Los Angeles, California.

=== The Robot Ate Me ===
In 2002 he released They Ate Themselves, his first record as The Robot Ate Me and played his first shows in San Diego opening for notable touring acts such as Daniel Johnston, Tegan and Sara, Metric, Stars and The Blackheart Procession. Skyscraper magazine described his first release as "Quite possibly the year's most arresting experimental pop record, They Ate Themselves is a dizzyingly vibrant trip through death and multi-layered dissonance".

The controversial and highly experimental On Vacation was released in 2004 in which Adam Gnade declared "It's not even music outside the margins. Here the margins were never there, and if they were to encroach, The Robot Ate Me would probably up and croak." Punk Planet followed suit describing the album as "A hypnotic two-disc record that will score your twisted nightmares and fanciful dreams." Splendid summarized "It is impossible to understand a Robot Ate Me album from a written description."

After the release of On Vacation in 2004, he signed with Kill Rock Stars and toured the US heavily the next few years playing close to 600 shows in the following three years. His shows relied heavily on audience participation and were known for being fairly unpredictable. As part of his shows he would sometimes be dragged across the floor by attendees, wear masks, scream loudly, have the audience play the supporting instruments for his songs without rehearsal, or abruptly leave after playing one song.

The 2005 release of Carousel Waltz brought a set of minimal American folk songs. The album was lauded by Babysue as a "strangely compelling and uplifting vision of how love affects a person. Soft and focused, these unusual tunes are simultaneously accessible and peculiar. The Robot Ate Me remains one of the most unique acts on the planet. Brimming with credible substance, Carousel Waltz is yet another killer album from an artist who just keeps getting better and better with time..."

Good World was released in 2006. The avant-garde album primarily consisted of sparse clarinet lines mixed with minimal percussion and falsetto vocals by Bouchard. Pitchforkmedia asked "Has someone bludgeoned frontman Ryland Bouchard?". And Tinymixtapes declared: "Not since the glory days of punk has an album come and gone so fast and left one with more questions than answers."

=== Solo work ===
In 2008, Bouchard released Seeds a hand-crafted limited edition box set with close to two hours of music (divided between an A-Sides CD/vinyl and a B-Sides CD), a DVD of Super 8 videos, four 7" vinyl records, letter-pressed lyrics, a hand silk-screened shirt, bag, poster, and a set of illustrations by his longtime collaborator Daniel Gibson. Only 500 copies of the set were made.

In early 2009, Bouchard completed a Take-Away Show video session for La Blogothèque where he performed songs from Seeds.

The 2009 double vinyl release Cowbirds and Cuckoos was released on November 15, 2009, by Swim Slowly Records. The release consists of two hand screen-printed records and photography by Ryland Bouchard. In February 2010, Swim Slowly Records released a digital EP "Better This Than Nothing", a collection of B-Sides from "Cowbirds and Cuckoos".

=== Film ===
With the release of "Seeds" in 2008 Bouchard also included a DVD worth of videos shot exclusively on Super 8 film. In 2009, he also released a series of Super 8 videos for the "Cowbirds and Cuckoos" release on YouTube. Using mostly a Braun Nizo S580 and Kodak Ektachrome 64T film, the videos include footage from various locations throughout Europe, Mexico and the United States. Completed without digital effects the films rely heavily on time lapse, slow motion and other experimental filmmaking techniques.

On Aug 31, 2011, the Portland Mercury reported that Lana Del Rey used Super 8 footage from Bouchard's "Good Life #2" for the original Video Games (song) music video.

On May 13, 2022, Bouchard shared stills for 16mm film footage contributed to "Scarlet" a film by Pietro Marcello.

On May 29, 2023, Bouchard announced work on a "non-narrative nature documentary on 16mm/35mm film."

== Discography ==
=== Albums/EPs ===
- They Ate Themselves (Swim Slowly, 2002) as The Robot Ate Me
- Live at the CBC (Swim Slowly, 2003) as The Robot Ate Me
- On Vacation (Swim Slowly, 2004) as The Robot Ate Me
- On Vacation (5 Rue Christine, 2005, Reissue) as The Robot Ate Me
- Carousel Waltz (5 Rue Christine, 2005) as The Robot Ate Me
- Good World (5 Rue Christine, 2006) as The Robot Ate Me
- Seeds Box Set (Swim Slowly, 2008)
- Cowbirds and Cuckoos (Swim Slowly, 2009)
- Better This Than Nothing (Swim Slowly, 2010)
- Only You (Swim Slowly, 2012)
- Hope Rides Alone (Swim Slowly, 2012)
- Bridge By Bridge (Swim Slowly, 2013) as The Robot Ate Me
- Circumstance (Swim Slowly, 2013) as The Robot Ate Me
- Whalers (Swim Slowly, 2017)

=== Compilation appearances ===
- Translation. Music. 3, Substandard (2003) – "Plane"
- Yeti 3, Yeti (2005) – "We Were Humans"
- Sur La Mer Samp Le Mer, 5RC / Kill Rock Stars (2006) – "Lynching Luncheon"
- Winter Holiday Album, 5RC / Kill Rock Stars (2006) – "Wonderland"
- ESOPUS 15, ESOPUS (2010) – "Hope Rides Alone"

== Band members ==
- Ryland Bouchard

=== Past members and contributors ===
- Kevin Michael Mayfield (Guitar, Vocals, Harmonica, Slide Guitar)
- Alan Lechusza (woodwinds and orchestral arrangements on Carousel Waltz and Seeds)
- Daniel Gibson (completed the artwork for all the albums)
- Jay Arner (Drums)
- Evan Kuhlmann (Contrabassoon)
- David Greenberg (drums)
- Are-Jay Hoffman (bass/violin)
- William Haworth (drums, horns, synthesizers)
- Edan Rosenberg (helped write lyrics for Carousel Waltz)
