= Between the Devil and the Sea =

EP by Oh No Oh My
- Released: February 5, 2005
- Recorded: 2004 in Austin, Texas
- Genre: Indie rock
- Length: 15:19
- Producer: Oh No Oh My

Oh No Oh My chronology
Between the Devil and the Sea (2005)	Oh No! Oh My! (2006)

Between the Devil and the Sea is the debut EP by indie rock band Oh No Oh My, released on February 5, 2005.

== Reception ==
Professional ratings
Review scores
Source	Rating
AllMusic	3/5 stars
Pitchfork	5.1/10

Margaret Reges of Allmusic described Between the Devil and the Sea as "a group of hook-driven, scribbly, smart, and fun songs. The production is clean, the nasal, somewhat goofy vocals are pleasantly bizarre, and the whole thing feels just about right." Chris Fore of QRO Magazine called it "an instant relaxer" due to the band's "cheerful sense of humor that boils over". Pitchfork Media's Liz Colville wrote a mixed review, criticizing the opening track "Oh Be One" for its lyrics, percussion and predictability, while complimenting the band's few "glimpses of raging passion" elsewhere on the EP.

== Track listing ==
1. "Oh Be One" - (2:14)
2. "Our Mouths Were Wet" - (4:18)
3. "The Party Punch" - (3:59)
4. "The Bike, Sir" - (1:02)
5. "A Pirate's Anthem" - (3:46)
