= On Vacation (The Robot Ate Me album) =

Studio album by The Robot Ate Me
- Released: February 2005
- Recorded: Portland, Oregon
- Genre: Folk rock/Indie
- Length: 40:00
- Label: Swim Slowly Records; 5 Rue Christine
- Producer: Ryland Bouchard

The Robot Ate Me chronology
Live at CBC (2004)	On Vacation (2005)	Carousel Waltz (2005)

Professional ratings
Review scores
Source	Rating
Allmusic	link

On Vacation was The Robot Ate Me's third album, released in 2004 by the band's frontman, Ryland Bouchard's label Swim Slowly Records, then reissued in 2005 by 5 Rue Christine. It contains the song Oh No! Oh My!, from which the band Oh No! Oh My! got their name.

== Track listing ==
=== Disc one ===
1. "The Genocide Ball"
2. "Jesus And Hitler"
3. "The Republican Army"
4. "Oh No! Oh My! (1994)"
5. "Crispy Christian Tea Time"
6. "You Don't Fill Me Up The Same"
7. "I Slept Through The Holocaust"
8. "Every Nazi Plane Has A Cross"
9. "On Vacation"

=== Disc two ===
1. "On Vacation"
2. "Watermelon Sugar"
3. "Apricot Tea"
4. "The Red-Haired Girl"
5. "Pre-Party 94"
6. "Oh No! Oh My!"
7. "The Tourist"
8. "I'm Ok"

== Members ==
- Ryland Bouchard (Vocals)
- RJ Hoffman (Bass and Violin)
- Dave Greenberg (Drums)
