= Garmiani =

Swedish record producer (born 1983)

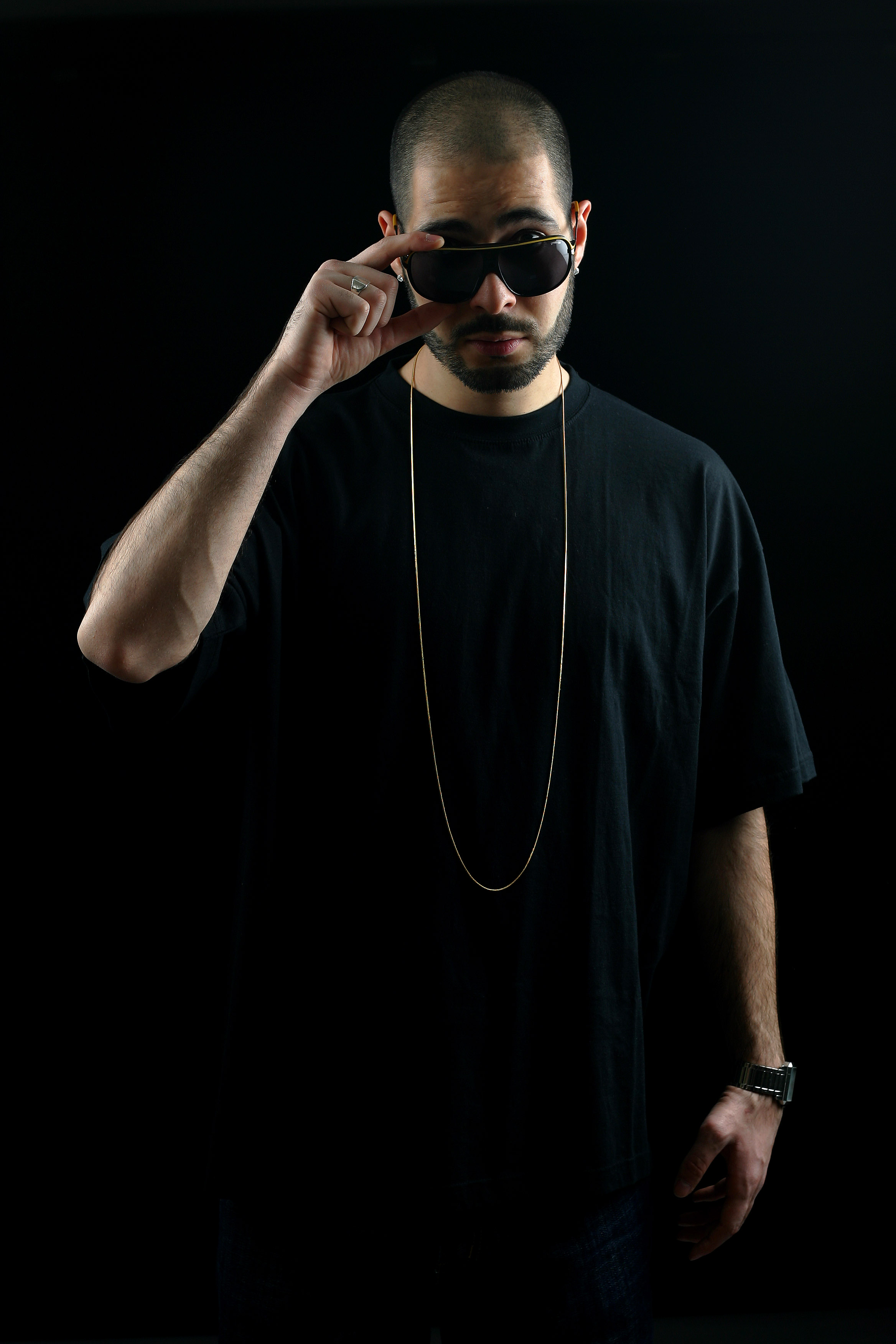

Background information
- Born: Jiar Garmiani; May 16, 1983 (age 43); Iraqi Kurdistan
- Genres: EDM; hip hop; electro house; big room house; trap
- Occupations: Musician; DJ; record producer; music executive
- Years active: 2012–present
- Labels: Dim Mak; Spinnin'
- Website: www.garmiani.com

Jiar Garmiani, better known as Garmiani, is a Kurdish-born Swedish record producer and DJ. He has worked with Steve Aoki, Snoop Dogg, Salvatore Ganacci, Lil Jon and Sean Paul among others. He has also performed at music festivals such as Creamfields and Tomorrowland Mainstage.

== Early life and career ==
Starting his career as a hip hop producer in 2001, it wasn't until 2012 he started releasing dance music under the ”Garmiani” moniker. In 2013 he released ”The city is mine”, a collaboration with Salvatore Ganacci. The same year he signed a record contract with Steve Aoki's Dim Mak Records and released ”Rumble EP”. The title track of the EP reached #1 on Beatport's electronica chart and was featured in the soundtrack of ”Need for Speed Rivals”. In 2015, his single ”Jump & Sweat” remained number 1 on Beatport's Electro house chart for three months. ”Bomb A Drop” was released in 2016 and was the most played track at Tomorrowland the same year. In 2017, his song ”Fogo” reached number 1 of the Beatport Electro house chart and was also the most played track of Tomorrowland that year. In 2018 he released a remix of ”Epic” by Sandro Silva and Quintino and in 2019 Garmiani released the singles ”Barraca” and ”Ava”, all through Spinnin' Records.

== Discography ==
=== EP ===
- 2013: Rumble

=== Singles ===
- 2012: "In Front of Your Eyes"
- 2012: "Now That We Found Love"
- 2013: "The City Is Mine" (with Salvatore Ganacci)
- 2013: "Rumble"
- 2014: "Zaza"
- 2014: "Nomad"
- 2015: "Jump & Sweat" (feat. Sanjin)
- 2016: "Bomb a Drop"
- 2016: "Voodoo" (feat. Walshy Fire)
- 2017: "Fogo" (feat. Julimar Santos)
- 2017: "Shine Good" (feat. Julimar Santos)
- 2019: "Baracca"
- 2019: "Ava"

=== Remixes ===
- 2013: Arash feat. Sean Paul – She Makes Me Go (Garmiani Remix)
- 2013: Manufactured Superstars – Zombies In Love (Garmiani Remix)
- 2013: Steve Aoki with Rune RK feat. Ras – Bring You To Life (Garmiani Remix)
- 2014: Deorro with ZooFunktion – Hype (Garmiani Remix)
- 2016: Lil Jon – Get Loose (Garmiani Remix)
- 2016: Steve Aoki feat. Snoop Lion – Youth Dem (Turn Up) (Garmiani Remix)
- 2018: Steve Aoki feat. Lauren Jauregui – All Night (Garmiani's Shine Good Remix)
- 2018: Sandro Silva with Quintino – Epic (Garmiani Remix)
