= 55DSL =

Italian clothing company

- Type: Private company
- Industry: Clothing
- Founded: Italy (1994)
- Headquarters: Marostica, province of Vicenza, Italy
- Key people: Andrea Rosso, Creative Director; Renzo Rosso, Founder
- Products: Clothing
- Website: www.55DSL.com

55DSL was a company founded in Italy as a 1994 spinoff from Diesel Clothing that sells male and female clothing in stores all around the world, that included the brand's own proprietary stores. According to the Diesel Clothing Wikipedia page (linked above), the two Diesel spinoff brands "Style Lab and 55DSL are now defunct".

== History ==
In the beginning 55DSL was an experimental line for Diesel. Its first collection was called 'FW94, Subzero Winter' - a male collection consisting of 55 pieces in total.

After 5 years operating under Diesel, the brand became an independent business unit, and moved from Italy to Balerna, Switzerland. Here it stayed for six years (until 2005), when it moved back again to Italy. The 55DSL brand was also the featured apparel of the characters in EA Sports Need for Speed: Carbon.

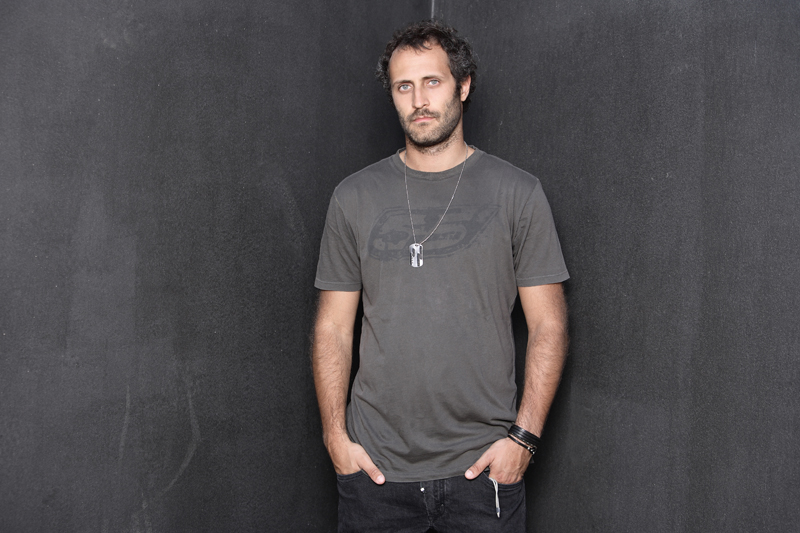
Andrea Rosso

The current Creative Director of 55DSL is Andrea Rosso, son of Diesel creator Renzo Rosso (born 1955).

== Brand Identity ==
55DSL is a bridging brand between urban culture and fashion. The core market for the brand is late teens and twenty-something urban men and women. According to the brand website, the brand is there to appeal to fashion-minded, young people, interested or involved in active sports, who have a DIY attitude.

== Brand Vision ==
The company's mission (as stated on the company website) is to "become the most famous fashion option in street-wear".
