= Let's Go Sailing =

American indie band

- Origin: Los Angeles, California, USA
- Genres: Indie pop
- Years active: 2002–present
- Members: Shana Levy
- Website: letsgosailingmusic.com

Let's Go Sailing are an American indie band founded by Shana Levy in 2002. After several years of work, the group completed their first album in 2006 and released it nationally in 2007.

== History ==
Levy had previously performed with Rilo Kiley and Irving, leaving in 2002. She began recording with Tanya Haden, Nikki Monninger of Silversun Pickups, Brent Turner, and Byron Reynolds. After four years, the band released their debut album, The Chaos in Order.

Let's Go Sailing's T-shirt (designed by Shana Levy and Tanya Haden) won the 7th Annual Independent Music Awards in the Swag category.

Levy is currently working on a new record with the help of Todd Monfalcone (Beck/Portugal the Man).
