= Oh No! Oh My! =

Studio album by Oh No Oh My
- Released: July 11, 2006
- Recorded: 2005–2006 in Austin, Texas & Nashville, Tennessee
- Genre: Indie rock
- Length: 33:49
- Label: self-released
- Producer: Oh No Oh My

Oh No Oh My chronology
Between the Devil and the Sea (2005)	Oh No! Oh My! (2006)	Dmitrij Dmitrij (2008)

Professional ratings
Review scores
Source	Rating
Pitchfork Media	7.4/10

Oh No! Oh My! is the debut album of indie rock band Oh No Oh My, released on July 11, 2006.

== Track listing ==
1. "Skip the Foreplay" - 3:49
2. "Walk in the Park" - 2:22
3. "I Have No Sister" - 3:03
4. "Reeks and Seeks" - 1:51
5. "Lisa, Make Love! (It's Okay!)" - 3:18
6. "On the Town" - 2:19
7. "I Love You All the Time" - 2:18
8. "Jane Is Fat" - 3:47
9. "Farewell to All My Friends" - 3:50
10. "The Backseat" - 4:36
11. "Women Are Born in Love" - 2:32
