= Brixton (album) =

Studio album by Sneakbo
- Released: 2 March 2018
- Recorded: 2016–17
- Genre: British hip hop; road rap
- Length: 63:45
- Label: Jetskiwave
- Producer: Sneakbo (exec.); ATG Musick; Lekaa Beats (also exec.); Mazza Beats; Rocko; The Fanatix

Sneakbo chronology
| Certified (2015) | Brixton (2018) |

Singles from Brixton
- 1. "Active" Released: 25 September 2017; 2. "Nah" Released: 15 December 2017; 3. "Fuck It" Released: 26 January 2018

Brixton is the debut studio album by British rapper Sneakbo. It was released on 2 March 2018 independently by Jetskiwave Records. The album follows over nine years of Sneakbo releasing music, such as the commercial mixtape Certified (2015) and numerous non-album singles. Brixton includes guest appearances from Giggs, Not3s, Conor Maynard, and affiliates S.Wavey, M.Dargg, J Boy and Political Peak, among others. The majority of production is handled by Lekaa Beats, alongside additional production from Mazza Beats, ATG Musick and The Fanatix.

== Background ==
In 2010, Sneakbo released numerous online music videos for songs such as "Jetski Wave", "Touch ah Button" and "Wave Like Us", known for their infusion of hip hop and dancehall. He released his debut mixtape Jetskiwave on 10 January 2011, followed by I'm Buzzing the same year on 10 August 2011, leading to significant online attention. Between 2011 and 2013, Sneakbo released numerous non-album singles, such as "On My Mind" which was distributed by Def Jam Recordings. In October 2011, Sneakbo released "The Wave" which charted at number 48 on the UK Singles Chart. The following single, "Zim Zimma", peaked at number 35, becoming Sneakbo's first top 40 entry. In 2013, "Ring a Ling" charted at number 27 and became Sneakbo's highest-charting single to date. During this time, Sneakbo continued to release non-commercial songs through music videos on YouTube.

After parting ways with Play Hard Records, Sneakbo released a range of non-album singles independently. His first commercial project, Certified, was released on 20 December 2015.

== Promotion ==
The music video for "Intro" was released on the day of the album's release on 2 March 2018.

=== Singles ===
The lead single, "Active" featuring Giggs, was released on 25 September 2017, alongside its official music video. The song was produced by The Fanatix and was also released in promotion of the FIFA 18 soundtrack. It entered and peaked at number 90 on the UK Singles Chart.

The second single, "Nah" featuring Not3s, was released on 15 December 2017.

The third single, "Fuck It" featuring Swavey, Mdargg, J. Boy and Bellzey, was released on 26 January 2018.

== Track listing ==
Brixton
| No. | Title | Writer(s) | Producer(s) | Length |
|---|---|---|---|---|
| 1. | "Intro" | Agassi Odusina | Lekaa Beats | 3:44 |
| 2. | "They Don't Wanna See Me" | Odusina | Lekaa Beats | 3:15 |
| 3. | "Nah" (featuring Not3s) | Odusina; Lukman Odunaike | Lekaa Beats | 3:36 |
| 4. | "Back Then" | Odusina | Rocko | 3:10 |
| 5. | "Active" (featuring Giggs) | Odusina; Nathaniel Thompson | The Fanatix | 3:48 |
| 6. | "Peakbo" (featuring Political Peak) | Odusina; Political Peak | Lekaa Beats | 3:05 |
| 7. | "Living" | Odusina | Lekaa Beats | 3:22 |
| 8. | "I Heard" (featuring Yungen) | Odusina; Clive Brooks | Lekaa Beats | 3:11 |
| 9. | "Fuck It" (featuring S.Wavey, M.Dargg, J Boy and Bellzey) | Odusina; S.Wavey; M.Dargg; J Boy; Bellzey | Mazza Beats | 3:39 |
| 10. | "Most Hated" (featuring J Boy) | Odusina; J Boy | | 2:56 |
| 11. | "Till the End" (featuring Capo and Rendo) | Odusina; Capo; Rendo | | 3:36 |
| 12. | "Bad" (featuring Chezeeko) | Odusina; Chezeeko | Lekaa Beats | 3:11 |
| 13. | "Body Close" (featuring Team Salut and Afro B) | Odusina; Team Salut; Afro B | | 3:25 |
| 14. | "Get to Know Me" (featuring Conor Maynard and Daecolm) | Odusina; Conor Maynard; Daecolm Holland | Lekaa Beats | 4:07 |
| 15. | "Tonight" | Odusina | Lekaa Beats | 3:22 |
| 16. | "OT" (featuring Jasper TR) | Odusina; Jasper TR | Lekaa Beats | 3:00 |
| 17. | "24/7" (featuring Moelogo and J Boy) | Odusina; Moelogo; J Boy | ATG Musick | 3:29 |
| 18. | "Where I'm From" (featuring Micque) | Odusina; Micque | Lekaa Beats | 3:08 |
| 19. | "Outro" | Odusina | Lekaa Beats | 2:41 |
| Total length: | | | | 63:45 |

== Personnel ==
- Sneakbo – primary artist
- ATG Musick – production (track 17)
- Dalien – mixing, mastering
- Lekaa Beats – executive production (tracks 1–3, 6–8, 12, 14–16, 18–19)
- Mazza Beats – production (track 9)
- Rocko – production (track 4)
- The Fanatix – production (track 5)

== Charts ==
| Chart (2018) | Peak position |
|---|---|
| UK Albums (OCC) | 20 |

== Release history ==
| Region | Date | Format | Label |
|---|---|---|---|
| United Kingdom | 2 March 2018 | Streaming, digital download | Jetskiwave Records |
| United Kingdom | 2 March 2018 | CD | Jetskiwave Records; Banquet Records (distribution) |
