= NPC (AI girl group) =

Virtual musical group

- Genres: Electronic dance music; house; electropop; experimental pop; avant-pop
- Years active: 2021–present
- Members: Oxytocin; Cortisol; Adrenaline; Dopamine; Tomorrow

NPC is a digital girl group, virtual band and "AI girl group" formed in 2021 by Grimes. The digital group is currently all in progress and is beta. NPC became popular for their debut single with Chris Lake, "A Drug from God", gaining the group over 1 million monthly listeners on Spotify at that time, to a 2022 post on Twitter from an account called Media Empire.

== Discography ==
=== EP's ===
- Faries Cum First (unreleased)

=== Singles ===
- 2021: "A Drug from God" (with Chris Lake)
- 2022: "A Drug from God" (Sosa UK Remix)
- 2022: "A Drug from God" (Rebūke Remix)
