= Tujamo =

German DJ and music producer

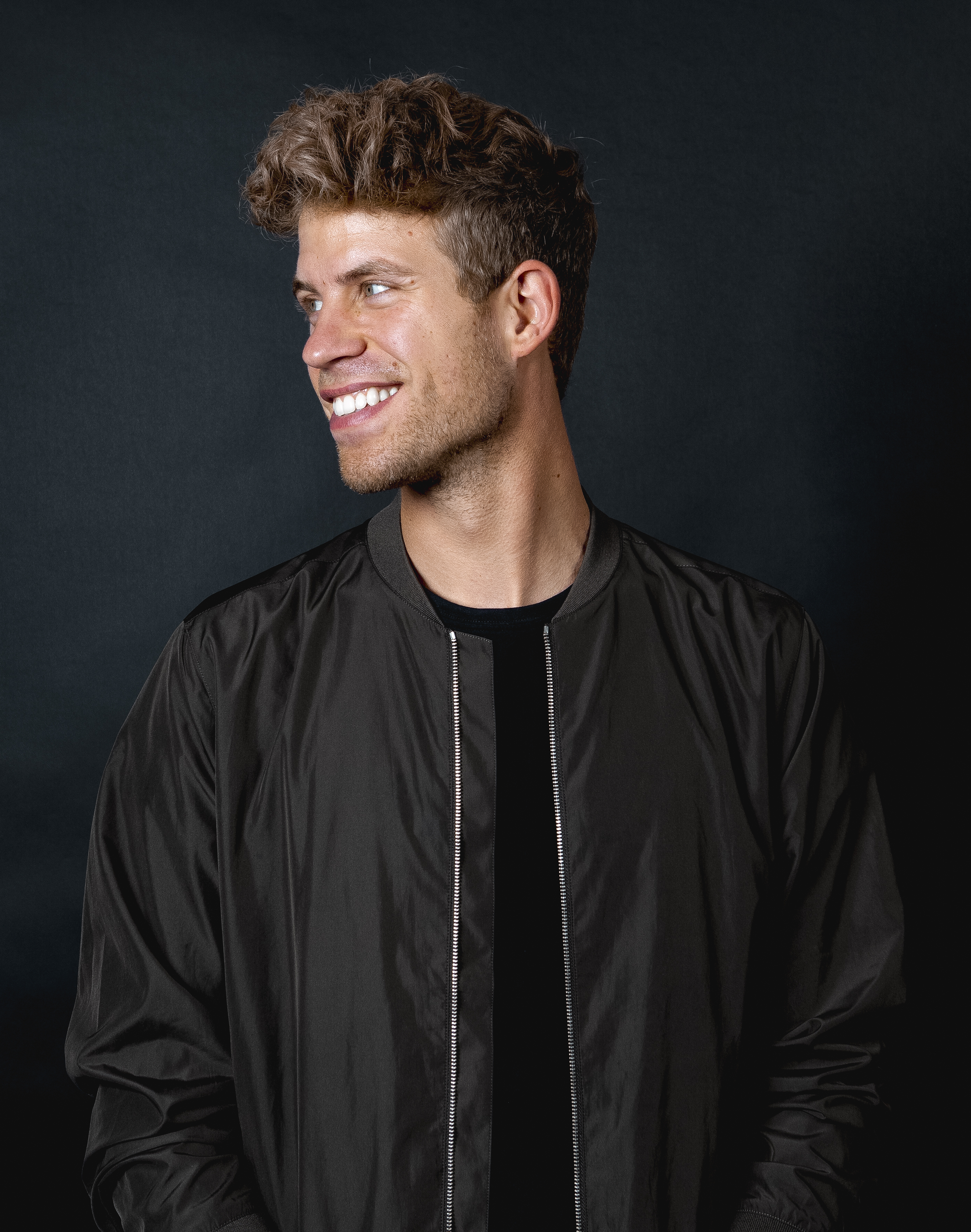
- Tujamo in 2018

Background information
- Born: Matthias Richter; 18 January 1988 (age 38); Detmold, North Rhine-Westphalia, West Germany
- Genres: Electro house
- Occupations: DJ; music producer
- Years active: 2005–present
- Labels: Spinnin', Universal Music Group, Mixmash Records, Dim Mak Records, Ultra Music, Smash the House
- Website: tujamo.com

Matthias Richter (German pronunciation: [maˈtiːas ʀɪçtɐ]; born 18 January 1988), better known by his stage name Tujamo, is a German DJ and electro house music producer. Tujamo, along with Plastik Funk and Sneakbo, released the single "Dr. Who!", which peaked at number 21 on the UK Singles Chart. He also had a hit with Steve Aoki and Chris Lake, "Boneless", which charted at #49 on the German Singles Chart and #42 on the Austrian Singles Chart.

== Background ==
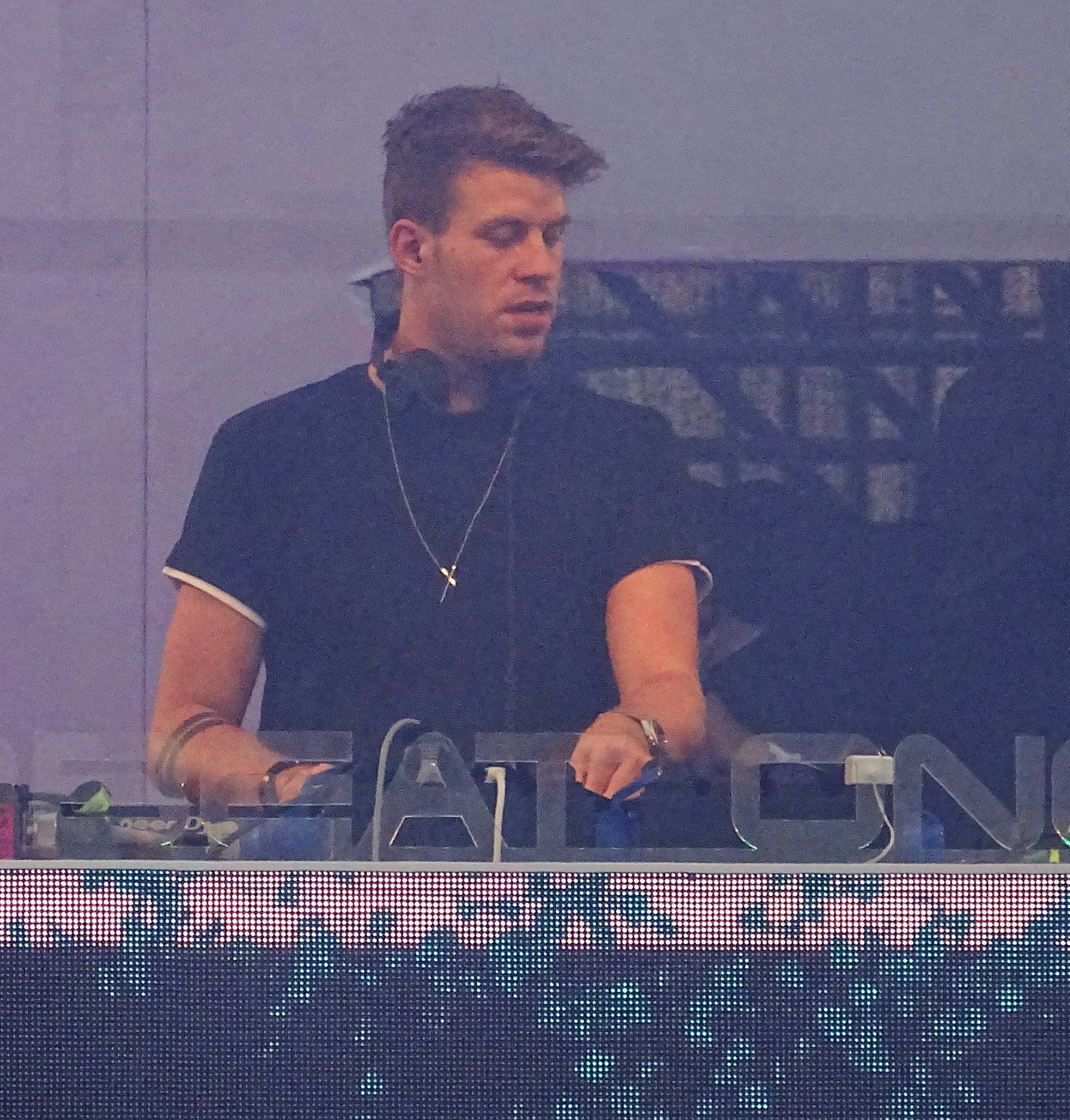
Tujamo performing at Airbeat One 2017

Tujamo was born Matthias Richter in 1988 in Detmold, North Rhine-Westphalia. He began DJing at age 17 and in 2006 participated in and won a talent competition hosted by Club Index in Schüttorf, where he became a resident DJ. He began using the Tujamo moniker that same year and released his debut single, "Mombasa", in 2011. His first hit, "Who", was originally released in 2012 in collaboration with Plastik Funk, also from Germany. It became a large hit at the Winter Music Conference, a Miami house club. In 2014, his single "Boneless", released in collaboration with Steve Aoki and Chris Lake, charted at number 49 on the German Singles Chart and number 42 on the Dutch Singles Chart. The same year, he reworked "Who" as "Dr. Who!" with vocals from British rapper Sneakbo and it charted at number 21 on the UK Singles Chart, receiving support from Avicii, Tiësto, Fedde Le Grand and Steve Aoki. He has also remixed songs by Bob Sinclar, Peter Gelderblom and Wynter Gordon and has played all over Germany and globally, including South America, Turkey, Brazil and Russia. Some of his other singles include "How We Roll", "Do It All Night", "Back 2 You" and a cover version of Laserkraft 3D's "Nein Mann".

== Beatport ==
In 2019, Tujamo became the all-time best-selling artist of the electro house genre at Beatport.

== Discography ==
=== Charted singles ===
List of singles as lead artist, with selected chart positions and certifications, showing year released and album name
| Title | Year | Peak chart positions | | | | | | | | Certifications | Album |
| Title | Year | GER | AUT | BEL | FRA | NLD | POL | UK | US | Certifications | Album |
|---|---|---|---|---|---|---|---|---|---|---|---|
| "Who" (with Plastik Funk) | 2012 | — | — | 43 | — | — | — | — | — | | Non-album singles |
| "Boneless" (with Steve Aoki and Chris Lake) | 2013 | 49 | 42 | 73 | 96 | — | — | — | — | RIAA: Gold | Non-album singles |
| "Hey Mister" | 2014 | — | — | 79 | — | — | — | — | — | | Non-album singles |
| "Dr. Who!" (with Plastik Funk featuring Sneakbo) | 2014 | — | — | — | — | — | — | 21 | — | | Non-album singles |
| "Nova" (vs. Dimitri Vegas & Like Mike and Felguk) | 2014 | — | — | 2 | — | — | — | — | — | | Non-album singles |
| "Delirious (Boneless)" (with Steve Aoki and Chris Lake featuring Kid Ink) | 2014 | — | — | — | — | — | — | — | 90 | | Neon Future.I |
| "S.A.X." (with Laidback Luke) | 2015 | — | — | 48 | — | — | — | — | — | | Non-album singles |
| "Booty Bounce" | 2015 | — | — | 101 | 118 | — | — | — | — | | Non-album singles |
| "Cream" (with Danny Avila) | 2015 | — | — | — | 117 | — | — | — | — | | Non-album singles |
| "Booty Bounce" (with Taio Cruz) | 2016 | 83 | — | — | — | 77 | — | — | — | | Non-album singles |
| "Drop That Low (When I Dip)" | 2016 | — | — | — | — | 80 | — | — | — | ZPAV: Platinum | Non-album singles |
| "Boom!" | 2016 | — | — | — | 44 | — | — | — | — | | Non-album singles |
| "Riverside (Reloaded)" (with Sidney Samson) | 2018 | — | — | — | 94 | — | — | — | — | | Non-album singles |
| "Lonely" (with Vize and Majan) | 2020 | 34 | 52 | — | — | — | 29 | — | — | ZPAV: Platinum | Non-album singles |
"—" denotes a recording that did not chart or was not released in that territory.

=== Non-charted singles ===
2009

- Beat Back

2010

- Switch It
- Mombasa

2011

- Do It All Night
- Back 2 You (with Robell Parker)

2012

- How We Roll
- Crump

2014

- Darth Theme (by John Williams)

2015

- Beat Back (Crazy Flute Mix)
- All Night (with Jacob Plant; Fly Eye)

2016

- Keep Pushin' (featuring Inaya Day; Spinnin' Records)

2017

- Make U Love Me (Spinnin' Records)
- One On One (featuring Sorana; Spinnin' Records)

2018

- Body Language (featuring Miranda Glory and Haris; Spinnin' Records)
- Funk You (with La Fuente; Spinnin' Records)
- With U (Official Untold Festival Anthem 2018) (featuring Karen Harding; Spinnin' Records)
- Jook It (with Salvatore Ganacci featuring Richie Loop; Spinnin' Records)
- Say What You Wanna (Spinnin' Records)

2019

- Get Up (Musical Freedom)
- Candy on the Dancefloor (Spinnin' Records)
- Getting Money (featuring 808Charmer; Spinnin' Records)
- Hell Yeah (Smash the House)
- Drop It (with Lukas Vane; Spinnin' Records)
- Shake It (with Nø Signe; Spinnin' Records)

2020

- One Million (with Lotten; Spinnin' Records)
- Taking You Home (with Kelvyn Colt; Universal Music)
- Enough of You (Universal Music)

2021

- I Don't Wanna Go (Universal Music)
- Nasty (with PBH & Jack; Spinnin' Records)

2022

- Down (Spinnin' Records)
- Click (Musical Freedom)
- Clap Your Hands (with JORD) [Spinnin' Records]
- Techno Party (with VINNE and Murotani) [Revealed Recordings]
- Better Safe Than Sorry (Spinnin' Records)
- Pump It Up (with 3 Are Legend (Dimitri Vegas & Like Mike, Steve Aoki) and Jaxx & Vega featuring Black & White Brothers) [Smash the House / DIM MAK]

2023

- IFLDM (with The Stickmen Project and Sleepwalkrs featuring GLASGOW KI$$) [Spinnin' Records]
- Drop That Low (When I Dip) [with Kid Ink] [Spinnin' Records]
- Vida Loca (with Antoine Delvig) [Spinnin' Records]
- Get Get Down (with Rudeejay and Da Brozz) [Spinnin' Records]
- Energy (with Jay Hardway featuring Bay-C) [Spinnin' Records]
- Turn It Up! (The Crew Motorfest Official Trailer) [Spinnin' Records]
- Freak (with Azteck and Inna) [Smash the House / Global Records]

=== Remixes ===
2010

- Tujamo – Auf gehts (Tujamo Remix)
- Shemian – 24 Hours (Tujamo Remix)
- Jochen Pash – From London to Detroit (Tujamo Remix)

2011

- Disfunktion – Dead Pixels (Tujamo Remix)
- Jim Tonique & Patrick Bryze – Better World (Tujamo Club Mix)
- Housepussies – Zora In Red (Tujamo Remix)
- Horny United featuring Philippe Heithier – Only You (Tujamo Remix)
- Ralph Good featuring Polina Griffith – SOS (Tujamo Remix)
- Boogie Pimps – Knocking (Tujamo Remix)
- Peter Gelderblom featuring Dominica – I Gotta Let U Go (Tujamo Remix)
- Tiko's Groove featuring Gosha – I Can't Get Nothing (Plastik Funk & Tujamo Remix)
- Fragma – Toca's Miracle (Tujamo Remix)
- Plastik Funk & Fragma – What Love Can Do (Tujamo Remix)

2012

- Bob Sinclar – Groupie (Tujamo Remix)
- Bastian van Shield – Nobody (Tujamo Remix)
- Dubvision – All By Myself (Tujamo Remix)
- Federico Scavo & Andrea Guzzoletti – Strump (Tujamo Remix)

2013

- Major Lazer – Jet Blue Jet (Tujamo Remix)

2014

- Laidback Luke & Martin Solveig – BLOW (Tujamo Remix)
- Deadmau5 – The Reward Is Cheese (Tujamo Remix)
- Jack Ü featuring Kiesza – Take Ü There (Tujamo Remix)

2015

- Laidback Luke featuring Goodgrip – Rocking With The Best (Tujamo Remix)
- Pep & Rash – Rumors (Tujamo Remix)
- Showtek featuring MC Ambush – 90s By Nature (Tujamo Remix)
- Dimitri Vegas & Like Mike featuring Ne-Yo – Higher Place (Tujamo Remix)
- Martin Solveig featuring Sam White – +1 (Tujamo Remix)

2017

- David Guetta featuring Nicki Minaj & Lil Wayne – Light My Body Up (Tujamo Remix)
- David Guetta featuring Justin Bieber – 2U (Tujamo Remix)

2019

- Tiesto – Grapevine (Tujamo Remix)
- Hugel – WTF (Tujamo Remix)

2020

- Debonair Samir – Samir's Theme (Tujamo Remix)

2021

- Sigma & Louis III – Anywhere (Tujamo Remix)

== Awards and nominations ==
=== Top 100 DJs ===
| Year | Rank |
|---|---|
| 2015 | 95 |
| 2016 | 78 |
| 2017 | 46 |
| 2018 | 46 |
| 2019 | 43 |
| 2020 | 40 |
| 2021 | 36 |
| 2022 | 35 |
| 2023 | 54 |
