= Neon Future I =

Studio album by Steve Aoki
- Released: September 30, 2014
- Recorded: 2013–2014
- Genre: EDM
- Length: 40:53
- Label: Ultra; Dim Mak
- Producer: Steve Aoki (exec.); Chris Lake; Tujamo; Afrojack; Flux Pavilion; Waka Flocka Flame; Machine Gun Kelly; Ray Kurzweil; will.i.am; Bonnie McKee; Aubrey de Grey; Kid Ink

Steve Aoki chronology
Wonderland (2012)	Neon Future I (2014)	Neon Future II (2015)

Singles from Neon Future I
- 1. "Rage the Night Away" Released: April 22, 2014; 2. "Delirious (Boneless)" Released: June 3, 2014; 3. "Free the Madness" Released: June 24, 2014; 4. "Get Me Outta Here" Released: September 16, 2014; 5. "Born to Get Wild" Released: November 7, 2014; 6. "Back to Earth" Released: April 3, 2015; 7. "Afroki" Released: June 3, 2015; 8. "Neon Future" Released: July 17, 2015

Professional ratings
Aggregate scores
Source	Rating
Metacritic	54/100
Review scores
Source	Rating
AllMusic	3.5/5 stars
Exclaim!	4/10
The Guardian	2/5 stars
PopMatters	5/10

Neon Future I is the second studio album by American DJ and producer Steve Aoki. It was released on September 30, 2014, through Ultra Records and Dim Mak Records. The second part of the album, Neon Future II was released on May 12, 2015.

== Singles ==
The album was preceded by the release of eight singles. The first two singles, "Rage The Night Away" and "Delirious (Boneless)", were the only two to be given additional remixes before the album's release. Both tracks also feature in the original motion picture soundtrack of the 2014 film Step Up: All In. Other singles of the album are "Get Me Outta Here", "Neon Future", "Back to Earth" and "Born to Get Wild", was featured in the 2014 horror film The Hive.

== Commercial performance ==
The album debuted at No. 1 on Dance/Electronic Albums, and No. 32 on Billboard 200, selling 10,000 copies in its first week.

== Track listing ==
No.	Title	Writer(s)	Length
1.	"Transcendence" (featuring Ray Kurzweil) (Intro)		2:03
2.	"Neon Future" (featuring Luke Steele of Empire of the Sun)	Steele	6:17
3.	"Back to Earth" (featuring Fall Out Boy)	Patrick Stump; Pete Wentz; Joseph Trohman; Andrew Hurley	4:03
4.	"Born to Get Wild" (featuring will.i.am)	William Adams	4:45
5.	"Rage the Night Away" (featuring Waka Flocka Flame)	Juaquin Malphurs; Joseph Harrison Sikora	4:45
6.	"Delirious (Boneless)" (with Chris Lake and Tujamo featuring Kid Ink)	Erin Beck; Brian Todd Collins; Lake; Whitney Phillips; Jenson Vaughan; Aid Vllasaliu	3:43
7.	"Free the Madness" (featuring Machine Gun Kelly)	Richard Colson Baker	4:19
8.	"Afroki" (with Afrojack featuring Bonnie McKee)	McKee; Nick Van De Wall	4:17
9.	"Get Me Outta Here" (featuring Flux Pavilion)	Joshua Steele	5:15
10.	"Beyond Boundaries" (featuring Aubrey de Grey) (Outro)		1:26
Total length:			40:53

Japanese version bonus tracks
No.	Title	Length
11.	"Boneless" (with Chris Lake and Tujamo)	4:30
12.	"Rage the Night Away" (Milo & Otis Remix)	3:35
Total length:		48:58

Google Play bonus tracks
No.	Title	Length
6.	"Delirious (Boneless)" (radio edit) (featuring Kid Ink)	3:05
11.	"Born to Get Wild" (Dimitri Vegas & Like Mike vs. BoostedKids Remix)	5:26
12.	"Delirious (Boneless)" (Chris Lorenzo Remix)	4:18
Total length:		49:06

Club Edition
No.	Title	Length
1.	"Neon Future" (featuring Luke Steele of Empire of the Sun)	5:46
2.	"Back to Earth" (featuring Fall Out Boy)	5:01
3.	"Born to Get Wild" (featuring will.i.am)	4:22
4.	"Rage the Night Away" (featuring Waka Flocka Flame)	5:31
5.	"Free the Madness" (featuring Machine Gun Kelly)	4:22
6.	"Afroki" (featuring Afrojack and Bonnie McKee)	6:03
Total length:		31:05

== Credits and personnel ==
- Steve Aoki – producer

Technical production

- Dave Kutch – mastering
- Erik Madrid – mixing
- Vincent Vu – mixing assistant

Additional musicians

- Ray Kurzweil – spoken word in "Transcendence"
- Aubrey de Grey – spoken word in "Beyond Boundaries"
- Patrick Stump – vocals and guitars in "Back to Earth"
- Pete Wentz – guitars in "Back to Earth"
- Joseph Harrison Sikora – additional vocals in "Rage the Night Away"

Other personnel

- Brian Roettinger – art direction, design
- Brian Ziff – photography

== Chart history ==
Chart (2014)	Peak; position
Austrian Albums (Ö3 Austria)	64
Belgian Albums (Ultratop Flanders)	68
Belgian Albums (Ultratop Wallonia)	96
Canadian Albums (Billboard)	18
Japanese Albums (Oricon)	38
Swiss Albums (Schweizer Hitparade)	71
UK Dance Albums (OCC)	12
US Billboard 200	32
US Top Dance Albums (Billboard)	1
US Digital Albums (Billboard)	13
US Independent Albums (Billboard)	4

== Certifications ==
Region	Certification	Certified units/sales
United States (RIAA)	Gold	500,000^{‡}
^{‡} Sales+streaming figures based on certification alone.

== Release history ==
Region	Date	Format	Label
United States	September 30, 2014	CD; digital download	Ultra Records; Dim Mak Records
Worldwide	September 30, 2014	CD; digital download	Sony Music
Japan	October 1, 2014	CD; digital download	Sony Music
