= Neon Future II =

Studio album by Steve Aoki
- Released: May 12, 2015
- Recorded: 2013–2015
- Genre: EDM
- Length: 43:52
- Label: Ultra; Dim Mak
- Producer: Steve Aoki (exec.); Freddy Wexler; Dan Farber; Matthew Koma; Gianni "Luminati" Nicassio; Tawgs Salter; Tony Junior; Albin Myers

Steve Aoki album chronology
Neon Future I (2014)	Neon Future II (2015)	Steve Aoki Presents Kolony (2017)

Singles from Neon Future II
- 1. "I Love It When You Cry (Moxoki)" Released: January 23, 2015; 2. "Darker Than Blood" Released: April 14, 2015; 3. "Lightning Strikes" Released: May 4, 2015; 4. "Home We'll Go (Take My Hand)" Released: October 9, 2015

Neon Future II is the third studio album by American DJ and producer Steve Aoki. It was released on May 12, 2015, through Ultra Records and Dim Mak Records, serving as the sequel to Neon Future I.

== Background ==
The second installment was finished around the same as the first. While Neon Future I contains more party-themed/club-styled songs, Neon Future II is supposed to show a "darker", more "emotional" side of the Neon Future theme.

It was announced to feature collaborations such as Linkin Park, Harrison, Matthew Koma, Tony Junior, Snoop Lion, and many more on the album. The songs with DJ Fresh and Tinie Tempah did not make the final cut of the album.

== Commercial performance ==
The album debuted at No. 2 on Dance/Electronic Albums, and No. 66 on Billboard 200, selling 7,000 copies in its first week.

== Singles ==
The lead single with Moxie Raia, "I Love It When You Cry (Moxoki)", was released January 23, 2015. Ten days after Aoki had already uploaded the radio edit to YouTube, the music video for the single was released on February 24, 2015.

The second single "Darker Than Blood", which features American rock band Linkin Park, was released on April 14, 2015. The song is their second collaboration after "A Light That Never Comes", which was featured on the band's second remix album Recharged. The single was first revealed in an interview with Billboard. It can also be heard on Steve Aoki's official SoundCloud page.

The third single "Lightning Strikes", with NERVO and Tony Junior, was released on May 4, 2015. Steve Aoki released this song early for streaming on his SoundCloud page.

== Track listing ==
All tracks are written by Steve Aoki, with additional writers listed below.

No.	Title	Writer(s)	Producer(s)	Length
1.	"Time Capsule" (Intro)		Steve Aoki	3:01
2.	"I Love It When You Cry (Moxoki)" (with Moxie Raia)	Laura "Moxie" Raia; Freddy Wexler; Dan Farber; Jason Evigan; Wayne Hector; David Kuncio; Austin Bisnow	Steve Aoki; Wexler (add.); Farber (add.)	3:11
3.	"Youth Dem (Turn Up)" (featuring Snoop Lion)	Calvin Broadus Jr	Steve Aoki	3:13
4.	"Hysteria" (featuring Matthew Koma)	Matthew Koma; Sam Watters	Steve Aoki; Koma (vocal)	4:26
5.	"Darker Than Blood" (featuring Linkin Park)	Chester Bennington; Rob Bourdon; Brad Delson; Dave Farrell; Joe Hahn; Mike Shinoda	Steve Aoki	5:12
6.	"Lightning Strikes" (with Nervo and Tony Junior)	Olivia Nervo; Miriam Nervo; Tony Claessens	Steve Aoki; Nervo; Tony Junior	3:58
7.	"TARS" (featuring Kip Thorne) (Interlude)		Steve Aoki	2:20
8.	"Home We'll Go (Take My Hand)" (with Walk Off the Earth)	Sarah Blackwood; Ryan Marshall; Gianni Nicassio; Thomas Salter	Steve Aoki; Luminati (co.); Thomas "Tawgs" Salter (co.)	5:07
9.	"Heaven on Earth" (featuring Sherry St. Germain)	St. Germain; John Dahlbäck	Steve Aoki	3:48
10.	"Holding Up the World" (featuring Harrison and Albin Myers)	Harrison Shaw; Albin Wagemyr	Steve Aoki; Albin Myers	3:21
11.	"Light Years" (featuring Rivers Cuomo)	Nicholas Furlong	Steve Aoki	4:08
12.	"Warp Speed" (featuring J. J. Abrams) (Outro)		Steve Aoki	2:07
Total length:				43:52

Japan version bonus tracks
No.	Title	Length
13.	"I Love It When You Cry (Moxoki)" (Boehm Remix)	5:22
Total length:		49:14

== Credits and personnel ==
- Steve Aoki – producer

Additional musicians

- J. J. Abrams – spoken word in "Warp Speed"
- Kip Thorne – spoken word in "TARS"
- Gianni "Luminati" Nicassio – drums, guitar, percussion and ukulele in "Home We'll Go (Take My Hand)"
- Nicholas "RAS" Furlong – backing vocals in "Light Years"

Other personnel

- Brian Roettinger – art direction, design
- Jamie Stuart – art direction, design
- Brian Ziff – photography

== Chart history ==
Chart (2015)	Peak; position
Belgian Albums (Ultratop Flanders)	93
Belgian Albums (Ultratop Wallonia)	132
Canadian Albums (Billboard)	25
Japanese Albums (Oricon)	38
UK Dance Albums (OCC)	36
US Billboard 200	66
US Top Dance Albums (Billboard)	2
US Digital Albums (Billboard)	16
US Independent Albums (Billboard)	7

== Release history ==
Region	Date	Format	Label
Worldwide	May 12, 2015	CD; digital download	Ultra Records; Dim Mak Records
