= Boneless (song) =

Song by Steve Aoki

Single by Steve Aoki, Chris Lake and Tujamo
- Released: August 23, 2013
- Recorded: 2013
- Genre: Electro house
- Length: 4:30
- Label: Dim Mak; Ultra
- Songwriters: Steve Aoki; Chris Lake; Matthias Richter; Aid "Valsal" Vllasaliu
- Producers: Steve Aoki; Chris Lake; Tujamo; Aid "Valsal" Vllasaliu

Steve Aoki singles chronology
"Omega" (2013)	"Boneless" (2013)	"Flight" (2013)

Chris Lake singles chronology
"Ohh Shhh" (2013)	"Boneless" (2013)	"Helium" (2013)

Tujamo singles chronology
"There It Is!" (2012)	"Boneless" (2013)	"Dr. Who!" (2014)

Music video
- "Boneless" on YouTube

"Boneless" is a song by American DJ/record producer Steve Aoki, British DJ/record producer Chris Lake, and German DJ/record producer Tujamo, courtesy of and in association with the original producer and composer Aid Vllasaliu. Named after the skateboarding trick of the same name, it was released on August 23, 2013, by Dim Mak Records and Ultra Records. The single received success through various dance charts in Europe; it peaked on the overall singles charts at number 49 in Germany, number 42 in Austria and number 44 in Belgium (Wallonia). A vocal version of the song featuring American rapper Kid Ink was released the following year.

Artistic gymnasts Angi Cipra and Ellie Downie have used the song for their floor music, with Downie winning the all-around at the 2017 European Artistic Gymnastics Championships while performing to the track.

The song also appeared in an Alexander Wang fashion show in September 2014.

It has also been used by the Atlanta Braves as a home run song.

== Music video ==
The music video for "Boneless" was recorded at and takes place in Venice Beach, Los Angeles. In the video, Chris Lake ("The Scribbler") and Steve "Benihana" Aoki star as the heads of two different skate gangs known as "The Rampants" and "The Dimmaks". The two groups have a skate-off. The video was directed by Peter Falloon a.k.a. The Bear, who worked with Monument Media to deliver the 1980s skater-inspired video.

== Track listing ==
Single
No.	Title	Length
1.	"Boneless" (Original Mix)	4:30

Remixes
No.	Title	Length
1.	"Boneless" (Keys N' Krates Remix)	2:56
2.	"Boneless" (Ookay Remix)	4:26

== Charts ==
=== Weekly charts ===
Chart (2013–2014)	Peak position
Austria (Ö3 Austria Top 40)	42
Belgium (Ultratip Bubbling Under Flanders)	23
Belgium Dance (Ultratop Flanders)	25
Belgium (Ultratop 50 Wallonia)	44
Belgium Dance (Ultratop Wallonia)	36
France (SNEP)	96
Germany (GfK)	49
Hungary (Dance Top 40)	9
Hungary (Rádiós Top 40)	9
Poland Dance (ZPAV)	26
US Bubbling Under Hot 100 (Billboard)	25
US Hot Dance/Electronic Songs (Billboard)	17

=== Year-end charts ===
Chart (2013)	Position
Hungary (Dance Top 40)	44
Hungary (Rádiós Top 40)	73
US Hot Dance/Electronic Songs (Billboard)	56

Chart (2014)	Position
Hungary (Dance Top 40)	35

== Certifications ==
Region	Certification	Certified units/sales
Australia (ARIA)	Gold	35,000^{‡}
Canada (Music Canada)	Platinum	80,000^{*}
Mexico (AMPROFON)	Gold	30,000^{*}
United States (RIAA)	Gold	500,000^{‡}
^{*} Sales figures based on certification alone.^{‡} Sales+streaming figures based on certification alone.

== Release history ==
Region	Format	Date	Label	Ref.
United States	Digital Download – single	August 23, 2013	Dim Mak Records; Ultra Records	
United States	Digital Download – Remixes	September 10, 2013	Dim Mak Records; Ultra Records	

== Delirious (Boneless) ==
"Delirious (Boneless)"

Single by Steve Aoki, Chris Lake, and Tujamo featuring Kid Ink

from the album Neon Future I
- Released: June 3, 2014
- Recorded: 2014
- Genre: Electro house
- Length: 3:43
- Label: Ultra; Dim Mak
- Songwriters: Steve Aoki; Christopher Lake; Brian Todd Collins; Erin Beck; Whitney Phillips; Jenson Vaughan; Aid "Valsal" Vllasaliu
- Producers: Steve Aoki; Chris Lake; Tujamo; Aid "Valsal" Vllasaliu

Steve Aoki singles chronology
"Rage The Night Away" (2014)	"Delirious (Boneless)" (2014)	"Get Me Outta Here" (2014)

Chris Lake singles chronology
"Helium" (2013)	"Delirious (Boneless)" (2014)	"Stomper" (2015)

Tujamo singles chronology
"Dr. Who!" (2014)	"Delirious (Boneless)" (2014)	"Scream" (2015)

Kid Ink singles chronology
"Next" (2014)	"Delirious (Boneless)" (2014)	"Body Language" (2014)

A vocal version of the song, entitled "Delirious (Boneless)," was released on June 3, 2014, as the second single from Steve Aoki's second studio album Neon Future.I. This version features rapper Kid Ink and was co-written by Erin Beck, Whitney Phillips, Jenson Vaughan, and Aid "Valsal" Vllasaliu. The song was featured in the soundtrack of the 2014 film Step Up: All In (as well as Aoki's previous single "Rage the Night Away"), the song was also featured on the 2015 film Furious 7 (although it is not included in the film's soundtrack album. However, it is featured on the deluxe edition of the soundtrack). The song was featured in the 2017 film Smurfs: The Lost Village and the 2019 film Men in Black: International. The song was also featured in the trailer and TV spots of the 2016 film War Dogs, the 2017 film Captain Underpants: The First Epic Movie and the 2022 film Paws of Fury: The Legend of Hank. In 2024, Aoki accompanied by the Japanese air-dance group AIRFOOTWORKS performed a routine to the song at the grand finale of the 19th season of talent show competition America's Got Talent.

=== Music video ===
A year after the original song's release, the official lyric video for "Delirious (Boneless)" was published on YouTube on August 27, 2014. The "Delirious" version was also given its own music video, which was directed by Golden Wolf and published to YouTube on October 9.

=== Track listing ===
Delirious (Boneless) – single
No.	Title	Length
1.	"Delirious" (Boneless) (Album Version)	3:43

Delirious (Boneless) – Remixes
No.	Title	Length
1.	"Delirious" (Boneless) (Chris Lorenzo Remix)	4:18
2.	"Delirious" (Boneless) (Reid Stefan Remix)	4:11

=== Charts ===
==== Weekly charts ====
Chart (2014)	Peak position
Canada Hot 100 (Billboard)	81
US Billboard Hot 100	90
US Hot Dance/Electronic Songs (Billboard)	9
US Hot Rap Songs (Billboard)	21
US Pop Airplay (Billboard)	33
US Rhythmic Airplay (Billboard)	20

==== Year-end charts ====
Chart (2014)	Position
US Hot Dance/Electronic Songs (Billboard)	22

=== Certifications ===
Region	Certification	Certified units/sales
Germany (BVMI)	Gold	200,000^{‡}
^{‡} Sales+streaming figures based on certification alone.

=== Release history ===
Region	Format	Date	Label	Ref.
United States	Digital Download – single	June 24, 2014	Ultra Records; Dim Mak Records	
United States	Digital Download – Remixes	August 25, 2014	Ultra Records; Dim Mak Records	
