= Darker Than Blood =

Single by Steve Aoki featuring Linkin Park

from the album Neon Future II
- Released: April 14, 2015
- Recorded: 2012–14
- Length: 5:12
- Label: Ultra; Dim Mak
- Songwriter(s): Steve Aoki; Chester Bennington; Rob Bourdon; Brad Delson; Dave Farrell; Joe Hahn; Mike Shinoda
- Producer(s): Steve Aoki

Steve Aoki singles chronology
"I Love It When You Cry (Moxoki)" (2015)	"Darker Than Blood" (2015)	"Lightning Strikes" (2015)

Linkin Park singles chronology
"Final Masquerade" (2014)	"Darker Than Blood" (2015)	"Heavy" (2017)

Music video
- "Darker Than Blood" (Official Video) on YouTube

"Darker Than Blood" (working title: "Horizons") is a song written and recorded by American musician Steve Aoki, featuring the vocals of American rock band Linkin Park. It is the second collaboration between them, after A Light That Never Comes (2013), and is included on Aoki's third studio album, Neon Future II. The single was available for pre-order on Amazon.com. A half-minute promo of the song was made available by both Aoki and the band. The single debuted on Twitch on April 13, 2015. It was released as the second single from Neon Future II on April 14, 2015.

== Background and promotion ==
While Neon Future I contains more party-themed/club-styled songs, Neon Future II is supposed to show a "darker", and more "emotional" side of the Neon Future theme. It will include the song "Darker Than Blood", which features Linkin Park. The song is their second collaboration after "A Light That Never Comes", their first collaborative song that's featured on Linkin Park's second remix album, Recharged. The song was first revealed in an interview with Billboard, and was released as the second single from the album on April 14, 2015. According to Aoki, the song had been a work in progress since 2012 and Mike Shinoda rewrote Aoki's original lyrics to make them darker, because Shinoda thought Aoki's original lyrics were "too happy". After the release of the song the album was available for pre-order on iTunes.

== Live performances ==
Parts of the song can be heard from Aoki's performance on February 28, 2015 at the Aragon Ballroom in Chicago, Illinois. During his performance at the 2015 Ultra Music Festival, Aoki previewed more of the song.

Linkin Park later debuted "Darker Than Blood" on their Rock on the Range show during their North American Summer Tour 2015 leg of The Hunting Party Tour. The song was played as a shortened version, featuring Chester Bennington and Mike Shinoda singing the first verse and chorus of the song over a synth similar to A Thousand Suns's "Fallout", and was always played as an intro to "Burn It Down".

== Critical reception ==
Critics mainly compared the song with their previous collaboration, "A Light That Never Comes". Dance Charts, a German dance music website, gave the song a positive response and claiming that the song would chart higher than their previous collaboration, saying that "the mixing of the various elements are pretty good at "Darker Than Blood". However, the number is aimed clearly at a pop and radio audience. Nevertheless, "Darker Than Blood" is liked better than "A Light That Never Comes". Perhaps the number is similarly successful." In a more mixed review, Direct Lyrics criticized the song saying, "It’s a shame that all of Chester’s intensity gets overclouded by Steve Aoki's commercial EDM beat. This is just not right, even though I will probably ‘lose it’ to “Darker Than Blood” anyway at a club."

== Music video ==
Production and shooting for the music video of the song was completed on April 9, 2015. Pictures of the video were revealed on Aoki and Mike Shinoda's Instagram pages. The music video features Linkin Park's Mike Shinoda with Steve Aoki. The video's theme is to save the world from the future. According to Aoki the album is more related to the video. He explained as, "Some of these [sci-fi] ideas are actually real trajectories that are going to happen in our lifetime." A lyric video in support of the single was released on the next date of the single release.

The video takes place in the year 2052 in the midst of a zombie apocalypse, where a virus has infected almost the entire world population. Shinoda and Aoki play scientists who work at the Centers for Disease Control and Prevention, who are trying to create a serum that will hopefully cure the infection. So far they are unsuccessful, as the experimental serums they are testing on patients (who are actually asymptomatic carriers of the virus) shows no effect. Intercut with these scenes also depicts a young boy (whose name is revealed to be Steven A. and have the same tattoo on the same place like Aoki towards the end of the video) who is trying to search for the center guided by a crudely drawn map, while being chased by several zombies. However, he does manage to reach the center safely. He is brought into the laboratory where the scientists are working, while Shinoda and Aoki attempt to develop yet another serum. This time, however the serum they invent successfully works on the boy, and he is cured of the virus. As the scientists, Shinoda, and Aoki celebrate their success, a graphics screen is displayed, showing that the number of cured survivors is rising at an incredibly fast rate.

As of November 2022, the music video for "Darker Than Blood" has over 10 million views on YouTube.

== Track listing ==
Single
No.	Title	Length
1.	"Darker Than Blood" (featuring Linkin Park)	5:12

Darker Than Blood: Remixes – EP
No.	Title	Length
1.	"Darker Than Blood" (featuring Linkin Park, Bassjackers Remix)	4:23
2.	"Darker Than Blood" (featuring Linkin Park, Panic City Remix)	3:43
3.	"Darker Than Blood" (featuring Linkin Park, Dirty Audio Remix)	2:59
4.	"Darker Than Blood" (featuring Linkin Park, Josh Macias Remix)	4:29

== Personnel ==
- Steve Aoki – programming, production

Linkin Park

- Chester Bennington – vocals
- Rob Bourdon – drums
- Brad Delson – lead guitar, backing vocals
- Dave "Phoenix" Farrell – bass, backing vocals
- Joe Hahn ("Mr. Hahn") – turntables, samples, programming, backing vocals
- Mike Shinoda – vocals, rhythm guitar, keyboard, piano, synthesizer

== Charts ==
Chart performance for "Darker Than Blood"
Chart (2015)	Peak position
US Hot Dance/Electronic Songs (Billboard)	36
US Dance/Electronic Digital Songs (Billboard)	47

== Release history ==
Region	Date	Format	Label
Worldwide	April 14, 2015	CD; digital download	Ultra; Dim Mak
United States	April 14, 2015	CD; digital download	Ultra; Dim Mak
