= Dr. Who! (Tujamo and Plastik Funk song) =

Single by Tujamo and Plastik Funk featuring Sneakbo
- Released: 23 March 2014
- Recorded: 2012
- Genre: House; hip house
- Length: 3:25
- Label: 3 Beat
- Songwriters: Matthias Richter; Darius Ellington; James Grant; Agassi Odusina
- Producers: Tujamo; Plastik Funk

Tujamo singles chronology
| "Boneless" (2013) | "Dr. Who!" (2014) | "Delirious (Boneless)" (2014) |

Sneakbo singles chronology
| "Ring A Ling" (2013) | "Dr. Who!" (2014) | "Active" (2017) |

"Dr. Who!" is a song by Tujamo and Plastik Funk. The song was originally titled "Who" and released by music producers Tujamo and Plastik Funk in 2012. A re-release featuring British rapper Sneakbo was renamed "Dr. Who!" and released by 3 Beat Records. This version reached number 21 on the UK Singles Chart.

== Background ==
"Who" was first released as an instrumental in 2012. It became a hit at Winter Music Conference and was played by artists such as Avicii. In a 2013 interview, Plastik Funk said it actually took the record "like a year" to gain momentum, but when it did, it became massive in clubs and gained support from DJs. One such DJ was Avicii, that they actually saw in Ushuaia in Ibiza shortly after he started supporting it, and thanked him for supporting it. As a result, he played the song later that day straight after he'd performed. They also stated that the song was a song they used as a party starter and one used in between sets due to its lack of vocals. Other people who played the record included David Guetta, Skrillex, Alvin Risk, Dog Blood, Major Lazer and Chuckie.

Musically, the song consists of a simple chord progression and contains a horn lead and chants with a jungle-esque beat reinforcing a thumping beat.

== Dr. Who! ==
In 2014, the song was rehashed as "Dr. Who!" and had vocals added to it by British rapper Sneakbo. These vocals namecheck Doctor Who, though do not directly pertain to the series. It was named Zane Lowe's Hottest Record in the World on 9 January 2014 and charted at #21 on the UK Singles Chart.

== Critical reception ==
Doandroidsdance.com called the song a "certified party-starter".

== Charts ==
| Chart (2014) | Peak position |
|---|---|
| Scotland Singles (OCC) | 22 |
| UK Singles (OCC) | 21 |
| UK Dance (OCC) | 9 |
