= The Distortion of Sound =

- Directed by: Jacob Rosenberg
- Written by: Michael Abell; Kevin Gentile; Carol Martori
- Produced by: Hana Leshner; Dennis McKinley; Suzanne Hargrove
- Starring: Slash; Quincy Jones; Mike Shinoda; Lianne La Havas; Snoop Dogg; Hans Zimmer
- Edited by: Carol Martori
- Music by: Lorne Balfe
- Production company: Bandito Brothers
- Release date: July 10, 2014
- Running time: 22 minutes
- Language: English

The Distortion of Sound is a 2014 advertisement for Harman produced by Vice Media. The advertisement presents itself as a documentary on the decline of sound quality in music distributed with lossy compression algorithms. The ad features paid interviews with vocalists, guitarists, producers, writers, rappers, film composers, mixing engineers, mixers, music journalists, acoustic researchers, loudspeaker engineers and chief engineers—including such artists as Mike Shinoda of Linkin Park, Slash, Quincy Jones, Snoop Dogg and Steve Aoki.

The ad was uploaded to YouTube using YouTube's lossy audio compression. The trailer of the film was also available on YouTube. The ad, as well as a trailer, was available on the official website of the film.

The film was premiered at a paid event in Los Angeles on July 10, 2014.

== Cast ==
The film includes the following various musical artists:

- Quincy Jones
- Slash
- Snoop Dogg
- Steve Aoki
- Lianne La Havas
- Mike Shinoda
- Hans Zimmer
- Kate Nash
- A. R. Rahman
- Dan the Automator
- Manny Marroquin
- Andrew Scheps
- Neil Strauss
- Dr. Sean Olive
- Greg Timbers
- Chris Ludwig

== Clips ==
The original film included clips of interviews. All the clips were uploaded separately on the official YouTube channel in the given sequences.

No.	Title	Presenter	Length
1.	"Introduction of the CD"	Slash	1:15
2.	"The Artist's Intention"	Mike Shinoda	1:07
3.	"Musicians"	Hans Zimmer	0:28
4.	"Physical Music"	Kate Nash	1:02
5.	"Head Bob Test"	Andrew Scheps	1:07
6.	"Shared Social Experience"	Mike Shinoda	2:14
7.	"Importance of Sound"	Hans Zimmer	1:00
8.	"Compressed Music"	Andrew Scheps	1:52
9.	"The Digital Age"	Kate Nash	1:32
10.	"Connecting with Fans"	Lianne La Havas	1:24
11.	"MP3"	Neil Strauss	1:06

== Music ==
The original score for the film was composed by Lorne Balfe. Whereas the film used only three songs out of which one is the collaboration between Linkin Park and Steve Aoki, and the other two songs are performed by Lianne La Havas. Whereas the song "Holding Company (Lost in the Echo 2011 Demo)" from the LP Underground XIII extended play was briefly used in the trailer for the film.

No.	Title	Writer(s)	Performer(s)	Length
1.	"A Light That Never Comes"	Linkin Park, Steve Aoki	Linkin Park x Steve Aoki	3:49
2.	"Ghost of Me"	Lianne La Havas, Matthew Hales	Lianne La Havas	4:14
3.	"Is Your Love Big Enough?"	Lianne La Havas, Matt Hales, Willy Mason	Lianne La Havas	3:22
