= It's the End of the World as We Know It (EP) =

EP by Steve Aoki
- Released: December 11, 2012
- Genre: Electro house, electropop, dubstep, electropunk
- Length: 18:19
- Label: Dim Mak Records

Steve Aoki EP chronology
It's the End of the World as We Know It (2012)	A Light That Never Comes (Remixes) (2014)

It's the End of the World as We Know It is the debut EP by American electro house musician Steve Aoki. It was released on December 11, 2012 through Dim Mak Records. The 3-track extended play includes five guest appearances from Angger Dimas, My Name Is Kay, Dan Sena, Miss Palmer, and Rune RK.

All three songs eventually became singles and were released with remixes, except for the third and last track "Transcend"; a vocal version of the song, entitled "Bring You to Life (Transcend)", featuring vocals by RAS, was released instead.

Its title is a reference to the 1987 R.E.M. song "It's the End of the World as We Know It (And I Feel Fine)".

== Track listing ==
No.	Title	Length
1.	"Singularity" (with Angger Dimas featuring My Name Is Kay)	6:15
2.	"Omega" (featuring Dan Sena and Miss Palmer)	6:04
3.	"Transcend" (featuring Rune RK)	6:00

== See also ==
- Dim Mak Records
