= Sneakbo =

British rapper

- Born: Agassi Babatunde Odusina; 25 July 1992 (age 34); Brixton, London, England
- Genres: British hip hop; road rap; dancehall
- Labels: Jetskiwave Records; Virgin EMI; Play Hard Records

Agassi Babatunde Odusina (born 25 July 1992), better known by his stage name Sneakbo, is a British rapper. His first song, "The Wave", peaked at number 48 on the UK Singles Chart and he has since released a number of top 40 hits, such as "Zim Zimma" and "Ring a Ling" between 2012 and 2013.

After releasing music for over eight years, Sneakbo released his debut album Brixton in March 2018.

== Early life ==
At a young age Sneakbo listened to the late rapper Tupac Shakur and pop star Michael Jackson. Sneakbo is of Nigerian descent. Sneakbo claims in his "Closer (Documentary)" that he founded the GAS (I.e., "Grind and Stack"/"Guns and Shanks" Gang) after one of his friends/fellow gang members got derecruited from a local Brixton Gang so he co-founded his own Gang. Some notable members of GAS Gang was Ard Adz, Mr.Grim, Political Peak, Sho Shallow, Young Troopz etc... who made a lot promotional mixtapes and music videos in the past which are still available on YouTube.

== Legal issues ==
=== Aggravated assault charges ===
Sneakbo spent three months incarcerated on Remand in Feltham Prison in late 2011 for threatening a woman in violation of an ASBO.

== Discography ==
=== Studio albums ===
List of studio albums, with selected chart positions
Title	Album details	Peak chart positions
Title	Album details	UK
Brixton	Released: 2 March 2018; Label: Jetskiwave Records; Format: CD, digital download	20

=== Mixtapes ===
- Jetski Wave (2011)
- I'm Buzzin (2011)
- Certified (2014)
- Jetski Wave 2 (2015)
- 9 Lives (2020)
- Jetski Wave 3 (2021)

=== Singles ===
==== As lead artist ====
Title	Year	Peak chart positions			Certifications	Album
Title	Year	UK	UK Ind.	UK R&B	Certifications	Album
"The Wave"	2011	48	7	—	BPI: Silver	Non-album singles
"Zim Zimma"	2012	35	2	—		Non-album singles
"Ring a Ling"	2013	27	5	—		Non-album singles
"Active" (featuring Giggs)	2017	90	11	40		Brixton
"Nah" (featuring Not3s)	2017	—	—	—		Brixton
"Fuck It" (featuring S Wavey, M Dargg, J Boy & Bellzey)	2018	—	—	—		Brixton
"—" denotes the recording that did not chart.

==== As featured artist ====
Title	Year	Peak chart positions	Album
Title	Year	UK	Album
"Dr. Who!" (Tujamo & Plastik Funk featuring Sneakbo)	2014	21	Non-album singles
"Mariah (Remix)" (Koomz featuring Sneakbo)	2018	N/A	Non-album singles
"Coño (Remix)" (Puri featuring Sneakbo & Lisa Mercedez)	2018	N/A	Non-album singles
