= Plastik Funk =

Music duo

- Origin: Germany
- Genres: House, electro
- Occupation(s): Disc jockeys, record producers
- Years active: 2002–present
- Labels: Spinnin' Records; Revealed Recordings
- Members: Rafael Ximenez-Carrillo; Mikio Gruschinske
- Website: plastik-funk.de

Plastik Funk are a music duo consisting of Rafael Ximenez-Carrillo and Mikio Gruschinske who teamed up with Tujamo and Sneakbo for their single "Dr. Who!", which peaked at number 21 on the UK Singles Chart.

== Career ==
Plastik Funk were formed in 2002 while Ximenez-Carrillo and Gruschinke were at high school. Ximenez-Carrillo was born in Madrid but emigrated to Grevenbroich, Nordrhein-Westfalen, whereas Gruschinke spent the former part of his life in Tokyo before settling in Berlin. They began DJing hip-hop at high school but after hearing the works of Frankie Knuckles and David Morales, switched to house. They met after becoming the DJs at two different nightclubs in Düsseldorf, They released their debut, the "Do It Right" EP, in 2003, and a string of club hits enabled them to tour around Germany and beyond. Since then they have remixed the likes of David Guetta, Robyn, Shaggy, and Deadmau5.

In 2011, they released thirteen singles, one of which was their first hit - a cover of C+C Music Factory's Everybody Dance Now, which penetrated the German charts. As a result, they were asked to commission a number of compilation album, including the German Ministry of Sound's 2009 Sessions. Their largest hit, Who, was first released in 2012 and gained the acclaim of Avicii, and was played at the Miami club the Winter Music Conference. Following its success, they toured all over the world and started living in Spain. In 2014, Who was remixed and turned into Dr. Who! ft. Sneakbo, which charted at #21 on the UK Singles Chart.

In 2018, Raphael Ximenez-Carrillo start touring without Mikio Gruschinske, because Mikio has problem with his back.

On 3 January 2020, Plastik Funk, with Nervo and Tim Morrison, released a cover of Pointer Sisters' "Dare Me".

== As lead artist ==
| Year | Title | Peak chart positions | Album |
| Year | Title | UK | Album |
|---|---|---|---|
| 2011 | "What Can Love Do" (with Fragma) | — | Non-album singles |
| 2014 | "Dr. Who!" (with Tujamo featuring Sneakbo) | 21 | Non-album singles |
| 2015 | "Raveille" (with Timmy Trumpet) | — | Non-album singles |
| 2018 | "Cream and Sugar" (featuring Daisy Killbourne) | — | Non-album singles |
| 2020 | "Dare Me" (with Nervo and Tim Morrison) | — | Non-album singles |
| 2020 | "High Enough" (with Firebeatz) | — | Non-album singles |
"—" denotes a recording that did not chart or was not released.
