= The Wave (Sneakbo song) =

"Wave"

Single by Sneakbo
- Released: 21 October 2011
- Recorded: 2011
- Genre: Electro hop
- Length: 3:44
- Label: Play Hard
- Songwriter(s): Agassi Odusina; James Grant; Darius Ellington
- Producer(s): ILL BLU

Sneakbo singles chronology
"Wave" (2011)	"Zim Zimma" (2012)

Music video
- "The Wave" on YouTube

"The Wave" is a 2011 song by British rapper Sneakbo. The song was released in the United Kingdom on 21 October 2011 by Play Hard Records, reached to number 48 on the UK Singles Chart and was added to BBC Radio 1's B-List.

== Music video ==
A music video to accompany the release of "Wave" was first released onto YouTube on 6 September 2011 at a total length of three minutes and thirty nine seconds.

== Track listing ==
Digital download
No.	Title	Length
1.	"Wave" (Explicit Edit)	3:35
2.	"Wave" (Clean Edit)	3:35
3.	"Wave" (Mike Delinquent Remix)	4:39
4.	"Wave" (Ibiza Dub Remix)	4:11
5.	"Wave" (Sibling Dubstep Remix)	3:41
6.	"Wave" (1st Born Remix)	4:30
7.	"Wave" (Maximus Baxter Remix)	3:24

== Chart performance ==
=== Weekly charts ===
Chart (2011)	Peak position
UK Singles (Official Charts Company)	48
UK Dance (OCC)	11
UK Indie (OCC)	7

== Certifications ==
Certifications for "The Wave"
Region	Certification	Certified units/sales
United Kingdom (BPI)	Silver	200,000^{‡}
^{‡} Sales+streaming figures based on certification alone.

== Release history ==
Region	Date	Format	Label	Ref.
United Kingdom	21 October 2011	Digital Download	Play Hard Records	
