= Zim Zimma =

Single by Sneakbo
- Released: 4 November 2012
- Recorded: 2012
- Genre: Electro hop, Afropop
- Length: 2:59
- Label: Play Hard Records
- Songwriter(s): Agassi Odusina, James Grant, Darius Ellington
- Producer(s): ILL BLU

Sneakbo singles chronology
"The Wave" (2011)	"Zim Zimma" (2012)	"Ring A Ling" (2013)

Music video
- Zim Zimma (Official Video) on YouTube

Zim Zimma is a song by English rapper Sneakbo. The song was released in the United Kingdom on 4 November 2012 by Play Hard Records and reached number 35 on the UK Singles Chart.

== Music video ==
A music video to accompany the release of "Zim Zimma" was first released onto YouTube on 20 September 2012 at a total length of three minutes and thirty nine seconds.

== Track listing ==
Digital download
No.	Title	Length
1.	"Zim Zimma" (Radio Edit)	2:59
2.	"Zim Zimma" (Explicit Edit)	3:53
3.	"Zim Zimma" (Dance Remix)	4:08
4.	"Zim Zimma" (Dance Extended Club Remix)	6:00
5.	"Zim Zimma" (Dance Extended Dub Remix)	6:00
6.	"Zim Zimma" (Garage Remix)	5:36
7.	"Zim Zimma" (Dubstep Remix)	3:05
8.	"Still Breathing"	3:42
9.	"Still Breathing" (Remix) (featuring Ard Adz & Sho Shallow)	3:22

== Chart performance ==
Chart (2012)	Peak position
UK Singles (OCC)	35
UK Dance (OCC)	9
UK Indie (OCC)	2

== Release history ==
Region	Date	Format	Label	Ref.
United Kingdom	4 November 2012	Digital Download	Play Hard Records	
