= Ring A Ling (Sneakbo song) =

Single by Sneakbo
- Released: 7 July 2013
- Recorded: 2013
- Genre: Electro hop; dancehall
- Length: 3:22
- Label: Play Hard
- Songwriter(s): Rexton Rawlston Fernando Gordon, Agassi Odusina, James Grant, Darius Ellington
- Producer(s): iLL BLU

Sneakbo singles chronology
"Zim Zimma" (2012)	"Ring A Ling" (2013)	"Dr. Who!" (2014)

Music video
- "Ring A Ling" on YouTube

"Ring A Ling" is a song by London rapper Sneakbo. Ring A Ling samples the chorus from Shabba Ranks "Ting A Ling". "Ring A Ling" was also playlisted on Radio 1 A list. The song entered the UK Singles Chart at number 27. The song was written by Rexton Rawlston Fernando Gordon, Agassi Odusina, James Grant, Darius Ellington and produced by ILL BLU.

== Music video ==
A music video to accompany the release of "Ring A Ling" was first released onto YouTube on 30 May 2013 at a total length of three minutes and twenty six seconds.

== Track listing ==
Digital download
No.	Title	Length
1.	"Ring A Ling" (Clean Edit)	3:22
2.	"Ring A Ling" (Explicit Edit)	3:22
3.	"Ring A Ling" (Play Hard Remix) (featuring Wiley, Krept and Konan)	3:22
4.	"Ring A Ling" (Paris Esquire Trap Remix)	2:38
5.	"Ring A Ling" (Ruff Loaderz Dance Remix)	6:04
6.	"Ring A Ling" (Teddy Music Garage Remix)	2:58
7.	"Ring A Ling" (Skinner & Brackes Deep House Remix)	6:08

== Chart performance ==
=== Weekly charts ===
Chart (2013)	Peak position
Scotland (OCC)	37
UK Hip Hop/R&B (OCC)	6
UK Indie (OCC)	5
UK Singles (OCC)	27

== Release history ==
Region	Date	Format	Label
United Kingdom	7 July 2013	Digital Download	Play Hard Records
