= Steve Aoki =

American DJ and music producer (born 1977)

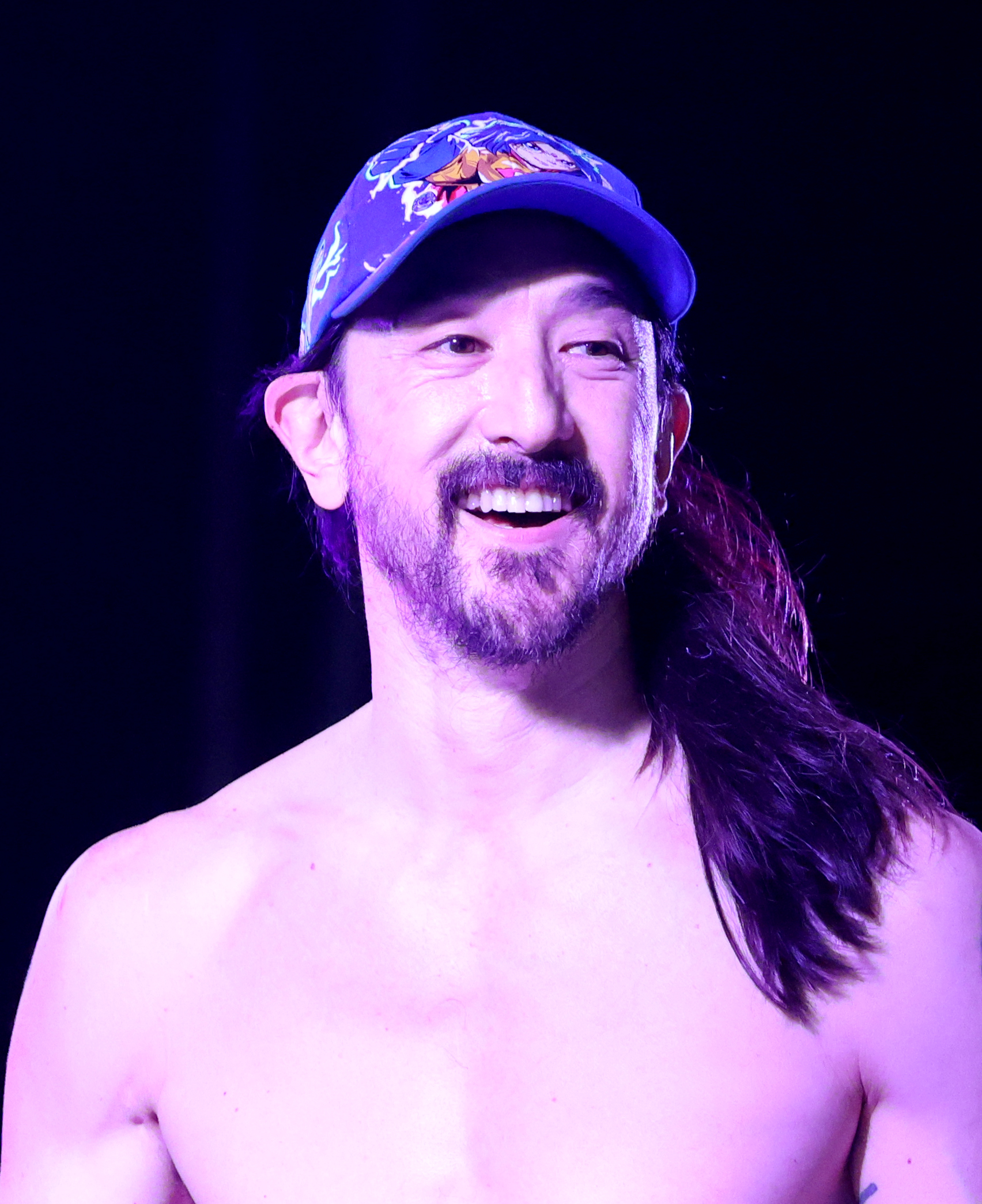
- Aoki in 2026

Background information
- Born: Steven Hiroyuki Aoki; November 30, 1977 (age 48); Miami, Florida, U.S.
- Origin: Newport Beach, California, U.S.
- Genres: EDM; electro house; big room house; Dutch house; trap; hardcore punk
- Occupations: DJ; record producer; music programmer; record executive; activist; philanthropist
- Instruments: Keyboards; synthesizer; Ableton Live; turntables
- Years active: 1996–present
- Labels: Dim Mak; Ultra; Spinnin'; Ministry of Sound
- Spouse: Tiernan Cowling (m. 2015; div. 2018); Sasha Sofine (m. 2024)
- Website: steveaoki.com

Steven Hiroyuki Aoki (/eɪˈoʊki/ ay-OH-kee; born November 30, 1977) is an American DJ and record producer. In 2012, Pollstar designated Aoki as the highest-grossing electronic dance music artist in North America from tours. In 2024, Gold House recognized him as one of the Most Impactful Asians. He has collaborated with artists such as will.i.am, Afrojack, AJR, LMFAO, Tini, Linkin Park, Agnez Mo, Iggy Azalea, Grandson, Lil Jon, Blink-182, Taking Back Sunday, Laidback Luke, BTS, Backstreet Boys, Vini Vici, Lauren Jauregui, and Fall Out Boy and is known for his remixes of artists such as Kid Cudi.

Aoki has released seven studio albums to date, including several Billboard-charting albums. His debut studio album Wonderland was nominated for Grammy Award for Best Dance/Electronica Album in 2013. In 2019, Aoki published a memoir, Blue: The Color of Noise. He is the founder of the Steve Aoki Charitable Fund, which raises money for global humanitarian relief organizations.

== Early life and education ==
Aoki was born on November 30, 1977, in Miami, Florida, but grew up in Newport Beach, California. He is of Japanese descent, the third child of Rocky Aoki and Chizuru Kobayashi. His father was a former wrestler who also founded the restaurant chain Benihana. His elder siblings are sister Kana Grace and brother Kevin (owner of Doraku Sushi restaurant). They have three half-siblings, including model and actress Devon Aoki.

Aoki graduated from Newport Harbor High School in 1995, where he was a player on the varsity badminton team. He later attended the University of California, Santa Barbara, graduating with two B.A. degrees: one in women's studies and the other in sociology.

During college, Aoki produced DIY records and ran underground concerts out of his Biko room in the Santa Barbara Student Housing Cooperative, which was located in Isla Vista, a section of residential land adjacent to UCSB. As a concert venue, the apartment became known as The Pickle Patch. Aoki was also involved in student activism at UCSB, being the founder of a Revolutionary Anti-Imperialist League chapter on campus.

By his early 20s, Aoki had built his own record label, which he named Dim Mak (a Chinese name for the "touch of death") – a reference to his childhood hero, Bruce Lee.

== Career ==
=== 1990s–2000s: Dim Mak Records and early releases ===
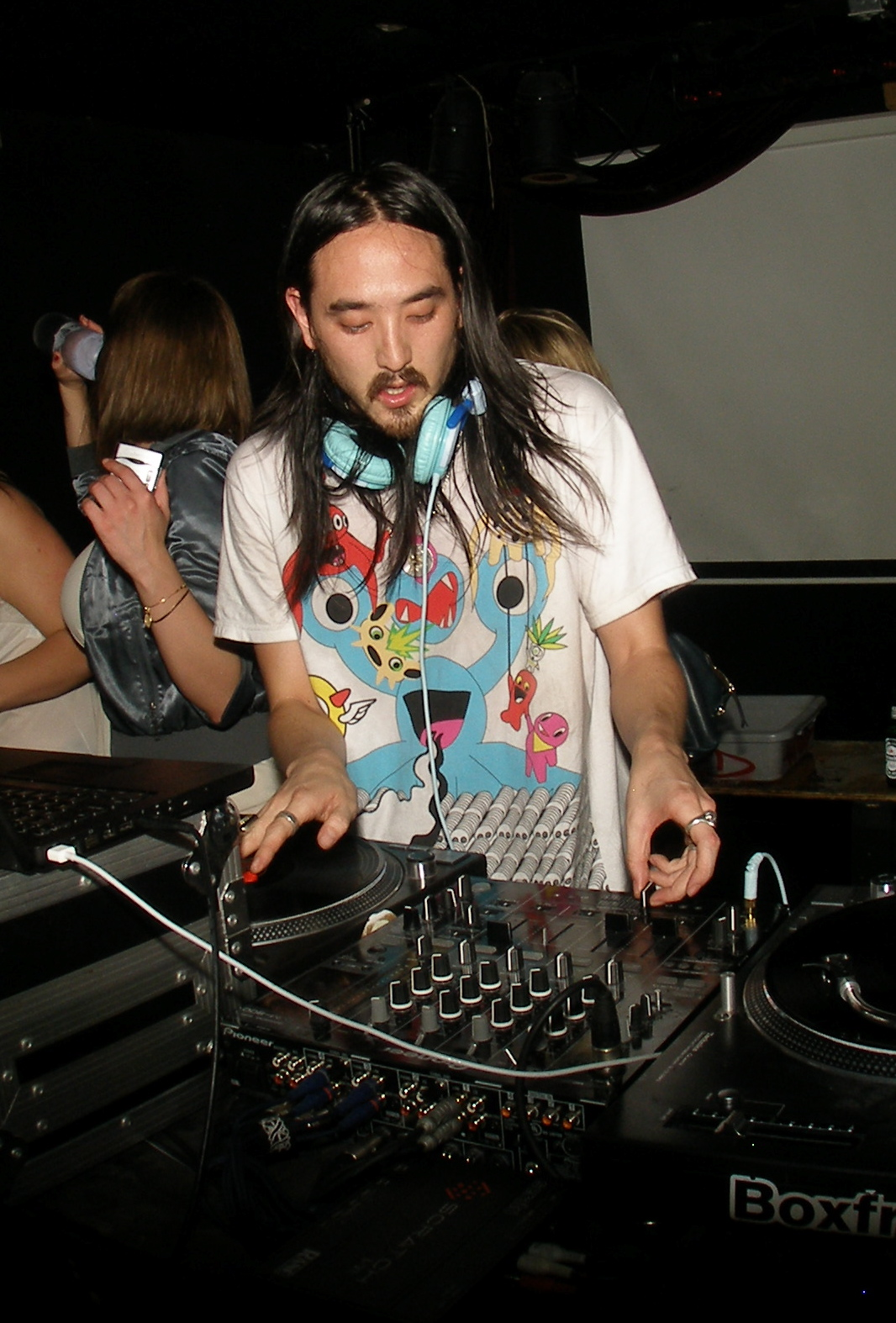
Aoki in 2008

Aoki founded his label, Dim Mak Records, in 1996. The label has released music by other electro house artists such as MSTRKRFT, The Bloody Beetroots, Felix Cartal, and Mustard Pimp, as well as Bloc Party, The Rakes, The Kills, Klaxons, Infected Mushroom, Scanners, Whitey, and Mystery Jets. Aoki teamed up with Blake Miller of the Los Angeles–based band Moving Units to produce remixes. The duo of Miller and Aoki work under the moniker Weird Science. Aoki has also been in numerous bands, including This Machine Kills, which released an album on Ebullition Records, Esperanza, and The Fire Next Time.

In May 2006, Aoki became a board member for MC5 bassist Michael Davis' Music Is Revolution Foundation, a non-profit organization that provides music education support within public schools. Aoki's debut DJ mix album, Pillowface and His Airplane Chronicles was released in January 2008. He had an Essential Mix that aired on BBC Radio 1 on August 2, 2008, and again on October 27, 2012. Aoki has collaborated with fellow producers and thus far has released singles with The Bloody Beetroots, Armand Van Helden of Duck Sauce, Afrojack, Laidback Luke, Tai, Chris Lake, Angger Dimas, Sidney Samson, and Tiësto. In his interviews, Twitter feed or from his YouTube channel he has shown teasers or has discussed doing future collaborations with Diplo, Knife Party, Datsik, Chris Lake, and more.

In the 1990s and 2000s, some of Aoki's remix work included artists such as: The Jackson 5, Drake, Kanye West, Eminem, Lil Wayne, Mike Posner, Girls' Generation, All American Rejects, Refused, The Killers, Bassnectar, Lenny Kravitz, Bloc Party, Snoop Dogg, Robin Thicke, S.P.A., Kid Cudi, Fërnando Oviedo, Chester French, BTS and Peaches. He remixed the track "The Wind Blows" that features on the UK edition of The All-American Rejects' 2008 album When The World Comes Down. On November 10, 2009, he released a remix for Drake's song "Forever". The song features Drake, Kanye West, Lil Wayne, and Eminem. The track topped Hype Machine's chart in December 2009.

=== 2010–2012: International breakthrough ===
Through relentless touring, he gained huge support from colleges. He is widely known for his acrobatic crowd surfing stunts, throwing cake at fans, spraying champagne bottles, and riding rafts on the dance floor. Performing an average of 250 shows a year, he started touring with production via bus tours, like the spring 2012 Deadmeat Tour, when he headlined more than 55 cities in 60 days across the United States and Canada. Many of the artists Aoki collaborates with make appearances on tour with him. He has played lesser-traveled regions – in 2009 he played a show in Beijing, China, with Diplo organized by promoters Split Works. In July 2012, Aoki was added to the Pollstar Top 100 North American Tours in their 2012 Mid-Year Report. The list designated Aoki as the highest grossing dance artist in North America for the first half of the year.

External videos
- Steve Aoki LIVE at Ultra Music Festival 2013 Weekend 1: Main Stage
- Steve Aoki & Laidback Luke ft. Lil Jon - Turbulence

In March 2010, Aoki released "I'm in the House", a collaboration with Zuper Blahq—the alter-ego of the Black Eyed Peas singer will.i.am. The song charted at No. 29 in the UK Singles Chart in its first week of release, and later entered the UK Dance Chart and the UK Indie Chart, peaking within the top five in each chart. The song was featured on an Episode of MTV's Jersey Shore, as well as in the feature film Piranha 3D and the trailer for Think Like a Man. Producer-songwriter Lucas Secon confirmed in a May 2010 interview with HitQuarters that he and Rivers Cuomo had recently worked with Aoki on a single.

Aoki's first solo album, Wonderland, was released January 2012 and features guest vocalists and musicians LMFAO, Kid Cudi, Kay, Travis Barker, will.i.am a.k.a. Zuper Blahq, Wynter Gordon, Rivers Cuomo, Lil Jon, Chiddy Bang, Lovefoxxx of CSS, Big John Duncan (former guitarist of the punk band The Exploited), and others. A remix album was released shortly after.

There was overcrowding during Aoki's set in the Halloween electronic music festival Thriller Music Park at Madrid Arena, Madrid, Spain. As an extension, there was a stampede, which resulted in three young women crushing to death (two died weeks later), and a further 29 people were injured. Aoki released a statement showing his devastation and that had he known what was happening, he would have stopped the show. He canceled his next show in Bilbao, Spain, out of respect for those who died as a result of the tragedy.

On December 11, 2012, Aoki released his first extended play, It's the End of the World As We Know It, which includes three songs. Aoki was nominated for Grammy Award for Best Dance/Electronica Album for Wonderland at the 2013 55th Annual Grammy Awards.

=== 2013: Various singles and features ===
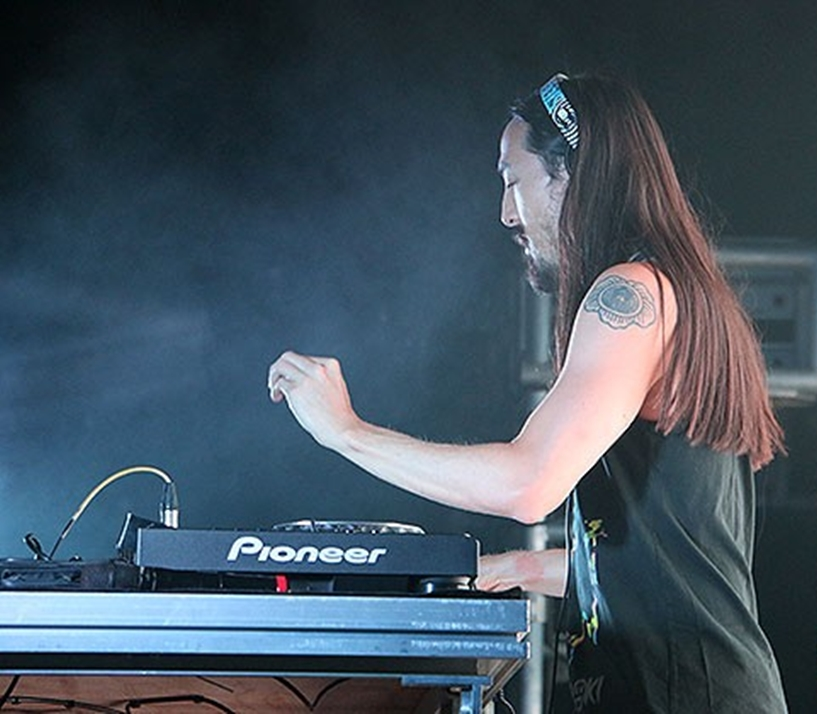
Aoki performing in Brazil, 2014

On October 11, 2013, Aoki collaborated with Linkin Park on the song "A Light That Never Comes" that was included on the remix album, Recharged, 18 days later. Several remixes of the song were added on the January 2014 digital download EP A Light That Never Comes (Remixes). "A Light That Never Comes" was used in films such as The Expendables 3. Aoki finished in 6th place in the 2013 America's Best DJ competition-a vote and promotion to find out the country's most popular DJ conducted by DJ Times magazine and Pioneer DJ.

From 2011 to 2014, he had several other tracks included in television shows, commercials, and films. This included "I'm In the House", used in the music festival documentary Electric Daisy Carnival in 2011, which in 2014 was used in a trailer for the comedy Think Like A Man Too as well. In 2012, his track "Beat Down", featuring Australian rapper Iggy Azalea, was used in a promo for the reality show Bad Girls All-Star Battle. From 2013 to 2014 his track "Boneless" was used in many commercials, with companies including Scion, Budweiser, and Sol Republic. His track "Get Me Outta Here" was used in a Scion commercial in 2014 as well, while "Free the Madness" was used in a 2014 Bud Light commercial. His track "Flight" in 2014 was used in a commercial for Sol Republic. Aoki's song "Back to Earth", featuring Fall Out Boy, was used in the 2014 film Step Up: All In, while his collaborative single "Freak" with Diplo and Deorro, featuring Steve Bays, was used in the 2014 film 22 Jump Street.

=== 2014–2016: Neon Future two-part album and film ===
The first part of Aoki's two-part album, Neon Future I, was released on September 30, 2014, and reached No. 1 on Dance/Electronic Albums in the United States. The second album, Neon Future II, features artists such as Snoop Lion and Rivers Cuomo. In the United States it peaked at No. 32 on the Billboard 200, No. 1 on Dance/Electronic Albums, and No. 4 on the Independent Albums chart. In Belgium, it reached No. 68 on the Ultratop 200 Albums chart.

In May 2015, it was announced that Relativity Productions had acquired the rights to distribute the documentary I'll Sleep When I'm Dead in the United States. Filmed during the making of his Neon Future double album, the film is focused on Aoki and delves into his family history, lifestyle, music, and business. It is co-produced by Matthew Weaver and David Gelb, who together had previously worked on the 2011 documentary Jiro Dreams Of Sushi. Among the executive producers are Ryan Kavanaugh and Tucker Tooley.

As with the first in the series, Aoki released promo singles leading up to the release of Neon Future II. The second of those singles, "Darker Than Blood", came out on April 14, 2015, and features vocals from Linkin Park. According to Aoki, the song had been a work in progress since 2012. Mike Shinoda rewrote Aoki's original lyrics to make them darker, because Shinoda thought Aoki's original lyrics were "too happy". Neon Future II was released on May 12, 2015, through Dim Mak. Among other artists, the second Neon Future featured Snoop Lion and Rivers Cuomo. It peaked at No. 2 on the US Dance/Electronic Albums chart, among other placements in the United States. In Belgium it reached No. 93 on the Ultratop 200 Albums chart.

The 2015 science fiction thriller film The Hive features tracks from the album Neon Future by Aoki,' who created the soundtrack and also served as an executive producer. Aoki is also the central character in the documentary I'll Sleep When I'm Dead.

=== 2017: Steve Aoki Presents Kolony ===
Aoki's fourth studio album, Steve Aoki Presents Kolony, was released on July 21, 2017. It features the songs "Night Call" featuring Migos and Lil Yachty, "Lit" with Gucci Mane, "Been Balling" with Lil Uzi Vert and the lead single "Without You" with DVBBS featuring 2 Chainz which was released in April and debuted at Aoki's Ultra Music Festival 2017 set in Miami. After the death of Linkin Park lead singer Chester Bennington in July 2017, Aoki released two tribute singles: "Darker Than the Light That Never Bleeds," a mashup of "A Light That Never Comes" and "Darker Than Blood", and a remix of the group's single "One More Light", dubbed the "Chester Forever" remix. In November 2017, it was confirmed that Aoki would be producing a remix of BTS's song "Mic Drop" featuring rapper Desiigner, which was released on November 24. That day, Aoki also released a collaboration with Fifth Harmony's Lauren Jauregui, titled "All Night".

=== 2018–2021: 5OKI, Neon Future III and Neon Future IV ===
In February 2018, Aoki announced the release of his five-track EP titled 5OKI, the follow-up to his 2016 EP 4OKI. The EP would feature him collaborating with other producers to produce a "cross-genre" track collective. "I'm really putting an emphasis on EDM and I'm putting an emphasis on cross-genre collaboration. For EDM itself I'm making a big statement of re-claiming it as something [that's] really important to me – kinda like giving back to my community," stated Aoki before the EP's release. The tracks were released at a weekly interval over five weeks from March 23 to April 20, with "Mayhem" featuring Quintino releasing on March 23, 2018, followed by "Pika Pika" with Loopers, "It's Time" with Laidback Luke, "Anthem" with Hardwell, and concluding with "Moshi Moshi" with Vini Vici.

On May 18, 2018, Aoki released the single "Pretender" featuring AJR and rapper Lil Yachty. In June 2018, Aoki remixed Rita Ora's hit single "Girls" featuring Charli XCX, Bebe Rexha and Cardi B. Later that month, alongside Italian DJ Marnik, they released their version of "Bella Ciao", which garnered controversy. Many deemed the new dance music version of the track inappropriate and insulting. On July 20, 2018, Aoki released the single "Lie to Me" featuring singer-songwriter Ina Wroldsen.

In an interview on August 6, 2018, he announced the release of his new album Neon Future III. It included collaborations with Ira Wroldsen, Nicki Minaj, Maluma, Blink-182, and BTS. On October 25, 2018, Aoki released "Waste It on Me" which features BTS members, RM, Jimin (with backup vocals), and Jungkook. The single, which was also included on Aoki's album, Neon Future III, marked Aoki and BTS' third collaboration as well as BTS' first all-English single. Neon Future III was released on October 9, 2018. In an interview with EDM.com, Aoki announced that his next album, Neon Future IV, would be released in 2019; it was later released in April 2020.

=== 2022–2023: Hiroquest: Genesis and Hiroquest 2: Double Helix ===
On September 9, 2019, Aoki released "Let It Be Me", a collaboration with Backstreet Boys, which came about after Aoki met Nick Carter at his Vegas show.

On June 24, 2020, he co-released "Ninja Re Bang Bang Steve Aoki Remix" with Japanese artist Kyary Pamyu Pamyu. This is a remix of Kyary's 2013 hit song of the same name. The song is a theme song for the free-to-play video game Ninjala, released the same day.

On August 21, 2020, Aoki remixed several songs by the anarcho-punk band Crass under a 12" single "normal never was III" with all purchases going towards domestic abuse charity "refuge".

Aoki released several non-album singles in early 2022, including "Welcome to the Playhouse" (featuring vocals by Shaquille O'Neal) on January 7, and "Da Homies" on February 4. He then began to release singles which later appeared on his upcoming seventh studio album, Hiroquest: Genesis. These included "Kult" (with Grandson featuring Jasiah), "Ultimate" (featuring Santa Fe Klan and Snow Tha Product), and "The Whistle" (featuring Timmy Trumpet and DJ Aligator).

On September 16, 2022, Aoki released his seventh studio album, Hiroquest: Genesis. The album features many notable collaborators including Mod Sun, PnB Rock, Taking Back Sunday, Lil Xan, Bryce Vine, and many more.

On January 12, 2023, Argentine singer Tini released "Muñecas", a collaboration featuring Aoki and singer La Joaqui, as the ninth single from her fourth studio album Cupido.

On August 18, 2023, Aoki announced his upcoming eighth studio album, a sequel to 2022's Hiroquest: Genesis, called Hiroquest 2: Double Helix. The album was released on November 17, 2023, and featured Paris Hilton, Akon, Angela Aguilar, Danna Paola, Greeicy, Galantis, JJ Lin, Hayley Kiyoko, Timmy Trumpet, and John Martin, among others.

A remix of "Locked Up" (originally by Akon) by Steve Aoki, Trinix, and Akon was released in August 2023.

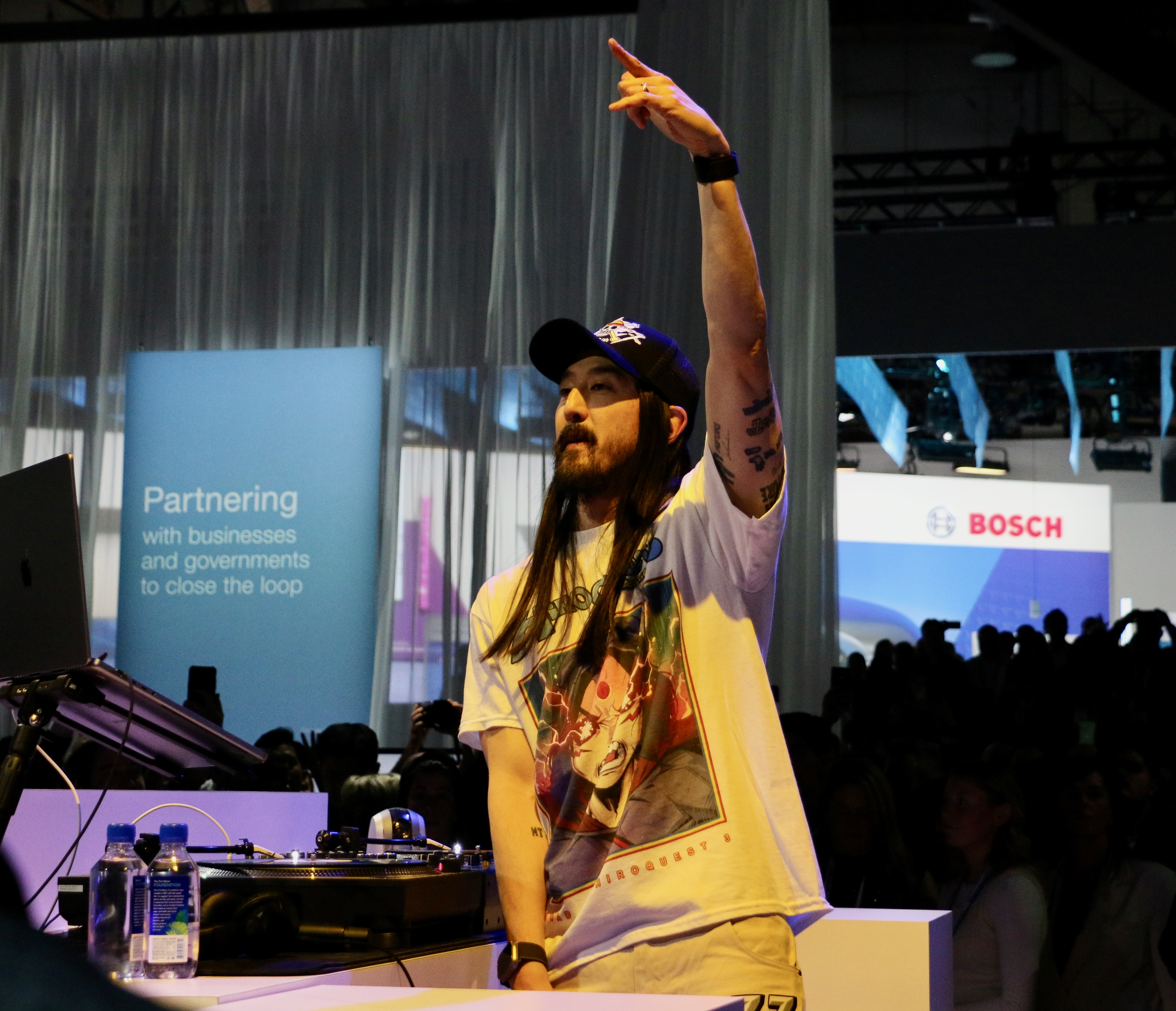
Aoki performing at Panasonic Pavilion during CES 2025

=== 2023–present: Paragon and Hiroquest 3: Paragon ===
On June 28, 2024, Aoki released his ninth studio album, Paragon and in June 2025, he announced his upcoming tenth studio album and sequel to Hiroquest 2: Double Helix, titled Hiroquest 3: Paragon, was released on June 27, 2025.

== Media appearances ==
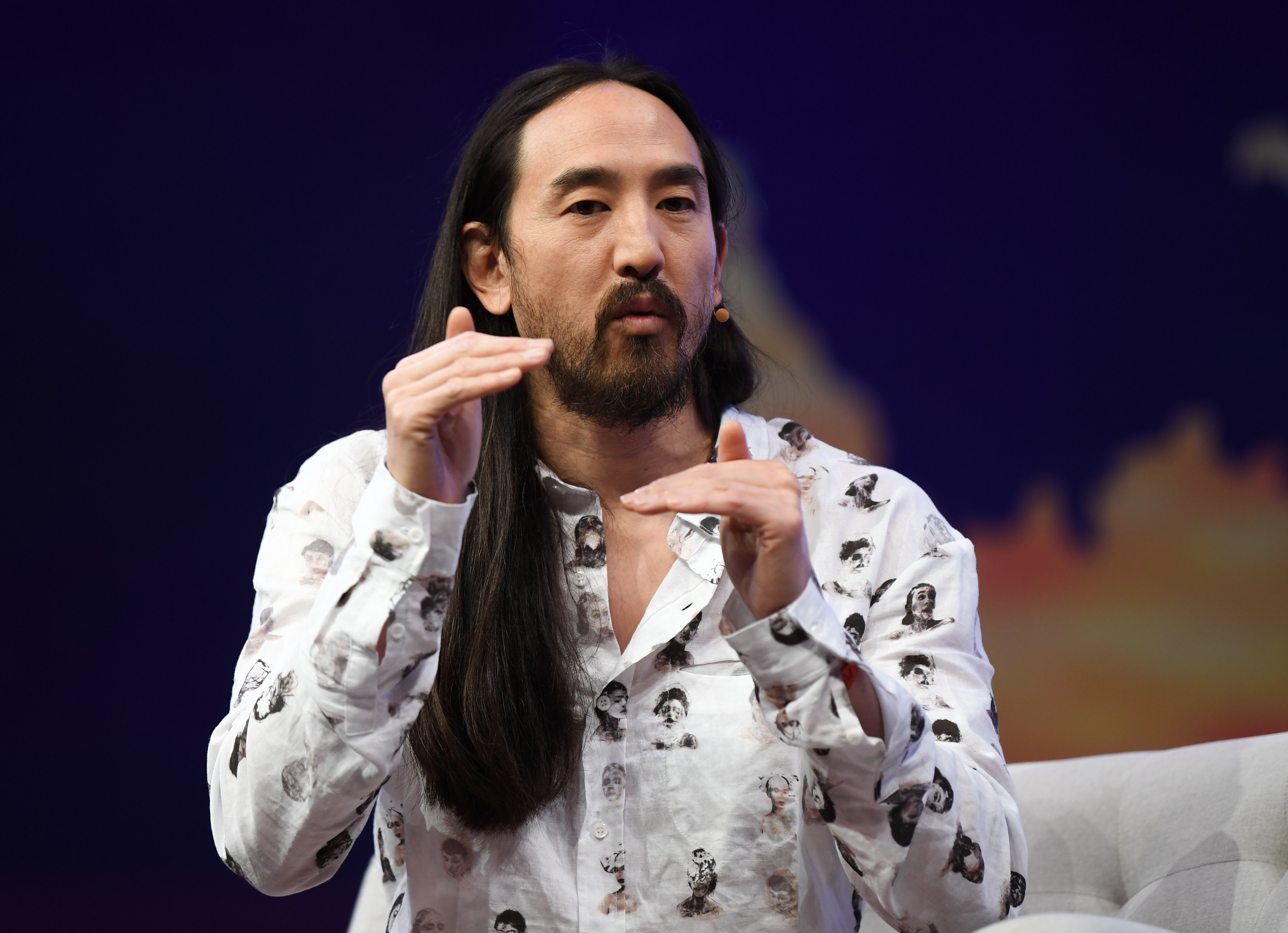
Aoki on stage during day three of Collision conference in 2019

Aoki has appeared in the media, notably in video games, television, and music videos. His interest in gaming led him to co-owning the esports company Rogue. He was featured in the video games NBA 2K8 and NBA 2K9 as a special celebrity player, even though he admits to being terrible at basketball. He makes cameos in the videos for Cobra Starship's 2007 single "Send My Love to the Dancefloor, I'll See You in Hell (Hey Mister DJ)" and The Sounds' single "Tony the Beat". Aoki made a cameo appearance in rapper Kid Cudi's video "Just What I Am". On July 1, 2016, it was announced that Aoki would make an appearance as both a musical contributor and non-playable character in the video game Dragon Ball Xenoverse 2.

In January 2012, Aoki released new tracks on Turntable.fm in conjunction with SOL REPUBLIC Headphones, making him the first established artist to orchestrate a listening session using the platform fully. Aoki appeared in an episode of The CW's superhero series Arrow that was first aired on March 20, 2013. He played himself, spinning at the grand opening of Oliver Queen's fictional nightclub. He also appeared in an anti-fur ad for PETA, an organization he says he's supported since he was 14 years old. Aoki appeared on Never Mind the Buzzcocks in December 2014. He currently resides in Henderson, Nevada.

On May 8, 2020, he performed in the Fortnite Party Royale Premiere with Dillon Francis and Deadmau5.

== Philanthropy ==
The Aoki Foundation helps fund research on the brain with a focus on regenerative medicine and brain preservation. The fund emphasizes the possibilities of natural life extension that come with the elimination of brain disease. The Foundation supports other causes such as disaster relief, research on developmental disabilities, and animal rights. It has partnered with Keep Memory Alive, SENS Research Foundation, the Buck Institute for Research on Aging, Music for Relief, and Best Buddies International.

In 2013, during his North American tour, Aoki donated a dollar of every ticket sale to four charities: the Brain Preservation Foundation, the University of Rochester Medical Center – Memory Care Program, the American Brain Foundation, and Infusio. Aoki fans were invited to vote for their favorite charity, with the Brain Preservation taking the grand prize. A total of $65,000 was donated, with $33,000 going to the Brain Preservation Foundation.

== Personal life ==
Aoki and Australian model Tiernan Cowling were engaged in 2010. They later married on the Hawaiian island of Maui in 2015 and resided in Las Vegas, Nevada. The couple amicably split in 2018, citing Aoki's rigorous tour schedule putting a strain on the relationship. In July 2024, Aoki married Sasha Sofine in Montenegro. The couple announced in January 2025 they were due to have a baby and did a gender reveal with Aoki's signature cake. The baby was born in July.

Actress and fashion model Devon Aoki is Steve Aoki's half-sister. Model and singer-songwriter Yumi Nu is Aoki's niece.

After applying in 2022, Aoki was selected to participate in a lunar spaceflight as part of the dearMoon project crew. The mission was slated to occur in the 2023 aboard a SpaceX Starship. Following delays with the Starship program, the dearMoon project was canceled in 2024.

Aoki is signed up for cryopreservation, discussing plans with Peter Diamandis in a 2022 interview A DJ's Crazy Schedule, Cryonics, and the Making of Pursuit of Happiness.

== Awards and nominations ==
Aoki has won or been nominated for various industry awards in annual competitions and magazine rankings. In 2007, he was named Best Party Rocker DJ by BPM Magazine, Best DJ of the Year by Paper Magazine, and Best Set of the Season at the Ibiza Awards. In 2012, he was named No. 15 in the Top 100 DJs in DJ Magazine and America's #2 Best DJ. Also in 2012, he won an EDM Effect Woodie Award by MTVu, and the following year he was nominated for his first Grammy.

Aoki has also won multiple awards over the years at the Electronic Dance Music Awards during Miami Music Week. Confirmed "Deck" awards have included two Best Club DJ of the Year and Favorite Nightclub Residency.

Aoki finished 6th place in the 2013 America's Best DJ competition conducted by DJ Times magazine, and finished 8th place in 2013 and 2016. He finished 10th in 2014, 2015, and 2017 in DJ Mag's Top 100 DJs competition. In 2014, Aoki and his fans received two Guinness World Records, one for the longest crowd cheer, and one for the most people lighting a glow stick simultaneously. Aoki performed at the 2015 Ultra Music Festival in Miami Beach on May 21. He also earned the Guinness record for "most traveled musician in one year", with 161 shows in 41 countries in 2014.

Aoki has been involved with various charities. EDM.com named him number one on their list of the 11 most charitable EDM producers. He founded the Steve Aoki Charitable Fund, which raises money for global humanitarian relief organizations and medical research. Among the organization's fundraising methods are Aoki's touring events, "memorabilia auctions", and collaborations with other artists. In early 2015 he was named a Global Ambassador for the Best Buddies program, a non-profit devoted to young people with developmental and intellectual disabilities. Around that time, MTV Latin America gave Aoki the Chiuku Award for humanitarian work at the International Dance Music Awards.

Selected awards for Steve Aoki
Year	Award	Nominated work	Category	Result
2007	Electronic Dance Music Awards	Steve Aoki	Best Club DJ of the Year	Won
2007	DJ Awards	Steve Aoki	Ibiza Set	Won
2008	Billboard Awards	Pillowface and His; Airplane Chronicles	Best Mix Album of the Year	Won
2012	World Music Awards	Steve Aoki	World's Best EDM Artist	Nominated
2013	Grammy Awards	Wonderland	Best Dance/Electronica Album	Nominated
2015	MTV Latin America	Steve Aoki	Chiuku Award	Won
2024	Electronic Dance Music Awards	Steve Aoki	Best Club DJ of the Year	Won
2024	Electronic Dance Music Awards	Steve Aoki	Favorite Resident DJ of the Year	Won

=== DJ Magazine Top 100 DJs ===
Year	Position	Notes	Ref.
2011	42	New Entry	
2012	15	Up 27	
2013	8	Up 7	
2014	10	Down 2	
2015	10	No change	
2016	7	Up 3	
2017	9	Down 2	
2018	11	Down 2	
2019	10	Up 1	
2020	9	Up 1	
2021	10	Down 1	
2022	7	Up 3	
2023	8	Down 1	
2024	12	Down 4	
2025	14	Down 2	

== Discography ==
- Wonderland (2012)
- Neon Future I (2014)
- Neon Future II (2015)
- Steve Aoki Presents Kolony (2017)
- Neon Future III (2018)
- Neon Future IV (2020)
- Hiroquest: Genesis (2022)
- Hiroquest 2: Double Helix (2023)
- Paragon (2024)

== Filmography ==
Year	Release title	Type	Role
2005	Punk'd – "David Boreanaz, Kristin Cavallari & Terrell Owens"	Television episode	Himself
2012	Chasing with Steve Aoki – 7 episodes	Television episodes	Himself
2013	Arrow – "The Huntress Returns"	Television episode	Himself (fictionalized version)
2014	The Distortion of Sound	Documentary	Himself
2015	I'll Sleep When I'm Dead	Feature documentary	Main subject
2015	The Hive	Feature horror film	Executive producer, soundtrack creator
2015	Robot Chicken – "Zeb and Kevin Erotic Hot Tub Canvas"	Television episode	Himself (voice)
2015	Point Break	Action film	Himself (cameo)
2016	Hell's Kitchen – "6 Chefs Compete"	Television episode	Himself (dining room guest)
2016	Why Him?	Feature film	Himself
2017	Charming	Animated film	Matilija DJ (voice)
2017	Bill Nye Saves the World	Talk show	Himself
2018	The Sidemen Show	Web series	Himself
2022	Senior Year	Feature film	Himself
2023	Pawn Stars	Television episode	Himself (guest appearance)

== See also ==
- Dim Mak Records
- Ultra Records
- List of dubstep musicians
- List of house musicians
