= Chris Lake =

English electronic producer and DJ (born 1982)

- Chris Lake in 2026

Background information
- Genres: House; progressive house; tech house
- Occupations: DJ; producer; remixer
- Instruments: Keyboards, turntables, music sequencer, drum machine
- Years active: 2002–present
- Labels: Blackbook; Nervous; Ultra Records; Rising Music; Rising Trax
- Member of: Under Construction; Anti Up
- Website: chris-lake.com

Christopher Daniel Lake is an English electronic dance music producer and DJ. He rose to fame in 2006 with his hit single, "Changes", featuring Laura V. He is a member of Under Construction with Fisher, and also a member of Anti Up with Chris Lorenzo.

Lake has been nominated for Best Remixed Recording twice at the Grammy Awards, first for his remix of The Chemical Brothers' "Galvanize" and second for his remix of Taylor Swift's "Opalite."

== Musical career ==
Lake first became recognized for his bootleg remixes of the Prodigy's "Climbatize", Leftfield's "Phat Planet", and Eurythmics' "Sweet Dreams", which he did under the alias Cristophe D'Abuc in 2002. By 2006, "Changes", featuring Laura V, reached the UK Singles Chart, peaking at number 27. The track was licensed by Universal Music for a full worldwide release, where it then reached number 10 on Billboard's Hot Dance Airplay chart. His 2007 single, "Carry Me Away" (featuring Emma Hewitt), was released on Nervous Records in the US and topped the Billboard Hot Dance Airplay chart. In 2012, Lake received his first Grammy nomination for collaborating with Deadmau5 on the album 4x4=12. He scored his third consecutive top ten hit on the US dance chart with "Only One". "If You Knew" featuring Nastala, also released on Nervous Records in the US became his 4th consecutive top 10 single on the US dance chart. At this time he also ran two record labels called Rising Music and Rising Trax, which took hiatus in 2014.

2015 saw a major direction change, Lake released 5 tracks on Ultra Records. The first was a single "Chest". NestHQ praised it: "It's not a frilly banger, it's not an esoteric deep cut. There's no sing-a-long happening here. Rather, Chris Lake has simplified his production to let all of the necessary elements shine". Following this was "Piano Hand", a collaboration with Chris Lorenzo, which was premiered on Annie Mac's BBC Radio 1 show and on Billboard. Two months after, Lake's collaboration with Anna Lunoe, "Stomper" was released and premiered on YourEDM, where it was acknowledged as "a charging house tune that received play throughout the entire festival circuit". During September, "Stranger" was released and got played at nearly every major festival throughout the US, according to 1001tracklists. Coinciding with this September release was a 3-month North American tour where he played at a handful of notable festivals and venues such as Hard Day of the Dead, Foundation Nightclub, and U Street Music Hall. His last release of 2015 was another collaboration with Chris Lorenzo called "The Calling". Their second collaboration was premiered on Mixmag and they were hailed as a "seemingly perfect match". Alongside these 5 originals, he also released the remix of Calvin Harris & Disciple's "How Deep is Your Love", which had received over 80 million streams accumulative and was one of the most popular house remixes on SoundCloud of the year.

2016 saw Lake release a handful of very popular remixes, the first of which being Jess Glynne's "Hold My Hand", which received over 3 million streams across various platforms. Shortly after, his official remix for Craig David's "Nothing Like This" was released on FFRR Records and received a significant amount of DJ support throughout Europe. His most notable remix for that year was for Missy Elliot's "WTF (Where They From)".

In 2017, Lake released "Operator" and launched his own music label Black Book Records. Aside from his new label, he curated Owsla's Howsla compilation with Skrillex, which was featured in Billboard and reached number 1 on the iTunes electronic chart. The compilation consisted of 12 tracks, including Lake's release "I Want You", a widely-supported single on the club circuit.

On 29 January 2019, it was announced that Lake would be performing at the Indy 500 Snake Pit on 26 May 2019 along with Skrillex, Alesso and Illenium. Previous performers have included Axwell ^ Ingrosso, Deadmau5, Diplo, GRiZ, Zedd, Marshmello, Martin Garrix, Steve Aoki, Kaskade, Hardwell, Dillon Francis and Zeds Dead.

== Discography ==
=== Studio albums ===
- Chemistry (2025)

=== Extended plays ===
- 2006: Mistakes (Rising Music)
- 2018: Close Your Eyes (with Walker & Royce)
- 2020: The Answer (with Armand van Helden)

=== Singles ===
- 2002: "Drink to Get Drunk" (Chris Lake vs Sia)
- 2002: "Santiago de Cuba" (Lost Language)
- 2004: "Filth" (with Rowan Blades) (Alternative Route Recordings)
- 2004: "Hiatus" (Pangea Recordings)
- 2005: "One Too Many / Electro Retro" (Rising Music)
- 2005: "Until She Rises" (Little Mountain Recordings)
- 2006: "Changes" (featuring Laura V) (Alternative Route Recordings, Nervous) (Billboard Hot Dance Airplay #10, Global Dance Tracks #18, European Hot 100 Singles #77)
- 2007: "Carry Me Away" (featuring Emma Hewitt) (Nervous)
- 2007: "Arguru" (with Deadmau5) (UK Dance #185)
- 2007: "I Thought Inside Out" (with Deadmau5)
- 2008: "Word / Ghost" (with Sébastien Léger) (Nervous)
- 2008: "If You Knew" (featuring Nastala) (Nervous) (Hot Dance Airplay #4)
- 2008: "Start Again" (featuring Nastala)
- 2010: "Minimal Life" (with Nelski) (Rising Music)
- 2010: "I Said" (Deadmau5 and Chris Lake)
- 2010: "Sleepwalker" (mau5trap)
- 2010: "Running Out" (with Marco Lys) (Nervous)
- 2010: "La Tromba Risin'" (with Marco Lys and Copyright) (Defected)
- 2011: "Colours" (with Nelski)
- 2011: "Secrets in the Dark" (Rising Music)
- 2011: "Sundown" (Nervous)
- 2012: "Damage Control"
- 2012: "Black Thong" (with Michael Woods)
- 2012: "Stand Alone" (with Lazy Rich featuring Jareth)
- 2013: "Ohh Shhh"
- 2013: "Boneless" (with Steve Aoki and Tujamo)
- 2013: "Helium" (featuring Jareth)
- 2015: "Stomper" (featuring Anna Lunoe)
- 2017: "Operator (Ring Ring)" (featuring Dances with White Girls)
- 2017: "I Want You"
- 2017: "Give Her Right Back" (featuring Dances with White Girls)
- 2017: "Nothing Better" (featuring Chris Lorenzo)
- 2018: "Turn Off the Lights" (featuring Alexis Roberts)
- 2018: "Lose My Mind"
- 2018: "Pizza" (with Anti Up and Chris Lorenzo)
- 2018: "Y.O.D.O" (with Destructo)
- 2018: "Dance with Me" (with Walker & Royce)
- 2018: "Drop Top" (with Walker & Royce)
- 2018: "Deceiver" (with Green Velvet)
- 2019: "Stay with Me"
- 2019: "Lies, Deception, and Fantasy" (with Lee Foss)
- 2019: "Free Your Body" (with Solardo)
- 2020: "I Remember"
- 2020: "The Answer" (with Armand van Helden featuring Arthur Baker and Victor Simonelli)
- 2021: "Beat Freak" (with Riva Starr featuring Lau.ra)
- 2021: "A Drug from God" (with NPC)
- 2022: "In the Yuma" (with Aatig)
- 2022: "Deceiver (VIP)" (with Green Velvet)
- 2023: "Dummy - Chris Lake Remix" (with Portugal. The Man)
- 2023: "Beggin'" (with Aluna)
- 2023: "Fool for Love (Chris Lake Edit)" (with Harry Romero and Leo Wood)
- 2023: "More Baby" and "More Baby (VIP)" (with Aluna)
- 2024: "Summertime Blues" (with Sammy Virji)
- 2024: "in2minds" (with Disclosure)
- 2025: "In My Head" (with Amber Mark )
- 2025: "Ease My Mind" (with Abel Balder)
- 2025: "Savana"
- 2025: "One2Three" (with Disclosure and Leven Kali)
- 2025: "LA NOCHE" (with Skrillex and Anita B Queen)

=== Remixes ===
- 2006: Menca - "Without You" (Chris Lake Remix)
- 2007: Deadmau5 - "Faxing Berlin" (Chris Lake Remix)
- 2015: Calvin Harris and Disciples — "How Deep Is Your Love" (Chris Lake Remix)
- 2016: Felix Jaehn — "Bonfire" (Chris Lake Remix)
- 2019: MK — "Body 2 Body" (Chris Lake Remix)
- 2021: Miane — "Who Are You?" (Chris Lake Remix)
- 2021: Lakou Mizik and Joseph Ray — "Bade Zile" (Chris Lake and Fritz Carlton Remix)
- 2022: Swedish House Mafia and The Weeknd – "Moth to a Flame" (Chris Lake Remix)
- 2023: Harry Romero Ft. Leo Wood – "Fool For Love" (Chris Lake Extended Edit)
- 2025: The Chemical Brothers - “Galvanize” (Chris Lake Remix)
- 2026: Taylor Swift - "Opalite" (Chris Lake Remix)

== Personal life ==
Lake moved to Scotland when he was "about 15", but considers himself English.
