= A Light That Never Comes =

Single by Linkin Park and Steve Aoki

from the album Recharged
- B-side: "Until It Breaks" (Datsik Remix)
- Released: October 11, 2013
- Recorded: 2013
- Genre: EDM; rap rock
- Length: 3:49 (album version)
- Label: Warner Bros.; Machine Shop; Dim Mak
- Songwriters: Linkin Park; Steve Aoki
- Producers: Mike Shinoda; Steve Aoki; Brad Delson

Linkin Park singles chronology
| "Castle of Glass" (2012) | "A Light That Never Comes" (2013) | "Guilty All the Same" (2014) |

Steve Aoki singles chronology
| "Flight" (2013) | "A Light That Never Comes" (2013) | "Bring You to Life (Transcend)" (2013) |

Music video
- "A Light That Never Comes" on YouTube

"A Light That Never Comes" is a song written and recorded by American rock band Linkin Park, and is their first collaboration with American DJ and record producer Steve Aoki. It was included on the band's second remix album, Recharged. It is the twenty-sixth single by the band. The song appears as the opening track on the album while a reboot version produced by Rick Rubin serves as the closing track. In addition to the song being released in advance when Recharged was partially released early on September 16, 2013, "A Light That Never Comes" was released to radio and made available to stream as a promotional single on digital music service Xbox Music on the same day. The CD single was released on October 11, 2013.

== Background and promotion ==
"A Light That Never Comes"
A 48 second sample of the chorus and outro of "A Light That Never Comes".

According to Mike Shinoda, "The coolest part about the song is it was really organic in how it came together ... Steve Aoki and I first talked on Twitter, and then we were emailing, and then we started throwing music back and forth." In an interview on August 30, 2013, with Shinoda and Aoki, Shinoda said that they began working on the song "no less than a half a year ago". He said they did not constantly work on it, but "the ideas would flow whenever...something new came up".

HBO featured the song in their 2013 fall preview advertisement. The band released the song's official lyric video on September 16 when players from across the world unlocked the track on LP Recharge, their first Facebook game. The song was heavily contributed in the 2014 documentary film The Distortion of Sound, which features Mike and Steve, as well as the background music for the introduction video of Grid Autosport. The Rick Rubin Reboot of the song was also featured in the soundtrack of 2014 American ensemble action film The Expendables 3.

== Live performances ==
Shinoda, Bennington, and Aoki performed the song together for the first time at the Summer Sonic Festival on August 10, 2013, in Tokyo, Japan. Aoki said, "we just kind of threw this show together like...it was very just raw." At the time, Shinoda said that there were no plans to perform the song again with Aoki, however, he said "I imagine it will happen," but he did not know if it would be the same set up as the Summer Sonic show, or if it would be the full band and Steve. He said he could see both happening.

On November 15, 2013, Mike Shinoda, Chester Bennington, and Steve Aoki performed the song with Blink-182 drummer Travis Barker at the Shrine Auditorium and Expo Hall. On November 26, Shinoda, Bennington, and Aoki performed the song on Jimmy Kimmel Live!.

On January 9, 2014, at The Joint in Las Vegas, Linkin Park performed the song for the first time as a full band without Aoki.

On Celebrate Life concert, the song was performed with pop singer Bebe Rexha on vocals.

== Critical reception ==
Stupid Dope gave the song a positive review, saying "The track is packed full of dope energy, heavy melodic elements, and of course, the patented sound of Linkin Park, as they mesh together nicely with Mr. Aoki."

=== Commercial performance ===
In its first week of release, the single sold 55,000 downloads in the US.

== Music video ==
On October 6, 2013, Joe Hahn confirmed a video for "A Light That Never Comes" is in production, by posting two behind the scenes pictures, and a short video preview on his Instagram account. The video was released a couple of days later, albeit on several sites across the world appealing to their respective regions only.

The music video was then officially released worldwide on YouTube on October 17, 2013. A behind-the-scenes feature of the video is on Dell's official website. It features the band and a statue of Steve Aoki in a cyber world along with an unnamed actress.

As of November 2023, the music video for "A Light That Never Comes" has over 40 million views on YouTube.

== Track listing ==
Stream
| No. | Title | Length |
|---|---|---|
| 1. | "A Light That Never Comes" | 3:49 |

CD single
| No. | Title | Length |
|---|---|---|
| 1. | "A Light That Never Comes" | 3:49 |
| 2. | "Until It Breaks" (Datsik Remix) | 6:00 |

== Remixes ==
A Light That Never Comes (Remixes)

EP by Linkin Park, Steve Aoki
- Released: January 21, 2014
- Recorded: 2013–14
- Genre: Electronic rock
- Length: 33:48
- Labels: Warner Bros.; Dim Mak
- Producers: Mike Shinoda; Brad Delson; Steve Aoki

Linkin Park chronology
| Recharged (2013) | A Light That Never Comes (Remixes) (2014) | The Hunting Party (2014) |

Steve Aoki EP chronology
| It's the End of the World As We Know It (2012) | A Light That Never Comes (Remixes) (2014) | 4OKI (2016) |

A Light That Never Comes (Remixes) is the third extended play released to the public by American rock band Linkin Park and the second released EP by American electro house musician Steve Aoki. It features seven remixes by seven various artists for the collaborated single, "A Light That Never Comes". This is one of their few extended plays that were not released by Machine Shop, which was founded by the band's co-vocalist Mike Shinoda. The whole album was available on Aoki's and Dim Mak's official YouTube channel.

=== Background ===
A Light That Never Comes (Remixes) features EDM remixes of the single. The EP was confirmed by the band on their Facebook page. The EP included artists like Rick Rubin, Angger Dimas, Coone and various others. The Vicetone remix was originally available for digital download when people Shazamed Linkin Park and Steve Aoki's performance on Jimmy Kimmel Live! straight to their own mobile phones or other electronic communication uses, which was recorded and aired on TV on November 26, 2013. The remix was actually a winner of the A LIGHT THAT NEVER COMES remix contest. The reboot by Rick Rubin for the song was also included in the band's second remix album, Recharged. It served as the closing track of the album.

=== Promotion ===
The EP was not promoted well but still it was commercially a success by the online shopping websites. For the promotion of the EP, there were two music videos for the Coone remix and the Vicetone remix, which were available on their YouTube channels. The video of the Coone remix is a live performance and also includes some lyrics of the song, but it was not declared as a lyric video. The video was directed by Editz. The video for the Vicetone remix was a remix of the official video of the single, which was an animated video, taken from the official video of the song by the band and Steve Aoki.

=== Track listing ===
| No. | Title | Length |
|---|---|---|
| 1. | "A Light That Never Comes" (Rick Rubin Reboot) | 4:40 |
| 2. | "A Light That Never Comes" (Vicetone Remix) | 3:53 |
| 3. | "A Light That Never Comes" (Angger Dimas Remix) | 4:53 |
| 4. | "A Light That Never Comes" (Twoloud Remix) | 5:40 |
| 5. | "A Light That Never Comes" (Coone Remix) | 5:45 |
| 6. | "A Light That Never Comes" (Vicetone Remix Dub) | 4:57 |
| 7. | "A Light That Never Comes" (Brian Yates Remix) | 4:00 |
| Total length: | | 33:48 |

== Charts ==
=== Weekly charts ===
Weekly chart performance for "A Light That Never Comes"
| Chart (2013) | Peak position |
|---|---|
| Australia (ARIA) | 56 |
| Austria (Ö3 Austria Top 40) | 21 |
| Belgium (Ultratip Bubbling Under Wallonia) | 21 |
| Canada Hot 100 (Billboard) | 51 |
| Canada Rock (Billboard) | 49 |
| France (SNEP) | 81 |
| Germany (GfK) | 8 |
| Ireland (IRMA) | 72 |
| Italy (FIMI) | 30 |
| Japan Hot 100 (Billboard) | 71 |
| Mexico Ingles Airplay (Billboard) | 5 |
| Poland Airplay (ZPAV) | 15 |
| Portugal (AFP) | 24 |
| Portugal Digital Song Sales (Billboard) | 47 |
| Scottish Singles Sales (Official Charts) | 29 |
| Slovakia Airplay (ČNS IFPI) | 73 |
| Switzerland (Schweizer Hitparade) | 15 |
| UK Singles (Official Charts) | 34 |
| UK Dance (Official Charts) | 8 |
| US Billboard Hot 100 | 65 |
| US Hot Dance/Electronic Songs (Billboard) | 8 |
| US Hot Rock & Alternative Songs (Billboard) | 11 |
| US Rock & Alternative Airplay (Billboard) | 15 |

=== Year-end charts ===
Year-end chart performance for "A Light That Never Comes"
| Chart (2013) | Position |
|---|---|
| Germany (GfK) | 91 |
| US Hot Dance/Electronic Songs (Billboard) | 46 |
| US Hot Rock & Alternative Songs (Billboard) | 55 |

| Chart (2014) | Position |
|---|---|
| US Hot Dance/Electronic Songs (Billboard) | 61 |

== Release history ==
| Region | Date | Format | Label |
|---|---|---|---|
| Worldwide | September 16, 2013 | Stream | Warner Bros.; Machine Shop |
| Austria | October 11, 2013 | CD | Warner Bros. |
| Germany | October 11, 2013 | CD | Warner Bros. |
| Switzerland | October 11, 2013 | CD | Warner Bros. |
| Worldwide | January 21, 2014 | Remix EP | Warner Bros.; Dim Mak |
