= Frat Party at the Pankake Festival =

Video by Linkin Park
- Released: November 20, 2001
- Recorded: Various locations
- Genres: Nu metal, rap metal, alternative metal
- Length: 50:03 (main title)
- Label: Warner Records
- Producers: Bill Berg-Hillinger, Joe Hahn, David May, Angela Smith

Linkin Park video chronology
Frat Party at the Pankake Festival (2001)	Live in Texas (2003)

Linkin Park chronology
In The End (2001)	Frat Party at the Pankake Festival (2001)	In the End: Live & Rare (2002)

Frat Party at the Pankake Festival is the first DVD by American rock band Linkin Park, released on November 20, 2001, through Warner Records. The DVD was produced by Bill Berg-Hillinger, Joe Hahn, David May and Angela Smith.

== Synopsis ==
The release documented the band on its touring cycle throughout to support the debut album, Hybrid Theory. It also features all four of the band's music videos up to that point, plus the "Cure for the Itch" and "Points of Authority" music videos (the latter was used to promote the DVD). It also includes bonus special features and several hidden easter eggs that unlock even more bonus special features.

== Chapter listing ==
No.	Title	Length
1.	"Intro"	1:51
2.	"Papercut"	3:12
3.	"Beginnings"	5:24
4.	"Points of Authority"	3:30
5.	"The Live Show"	3:17
6.	""Crawling" Video Shoot"	1:21
7.	"Crawling"	3:35
8.	"Touring"	9:28
9.	"Cure for the Itch"	0:54
10.	"The Band"	7:56
11.	"One Step Closer"	2:55
12.	"The Future"	2:43
13.	"In the End"	3:36
14.	"End"	0:16

Special Features
No.	Title	Length
1.	"Making of In the End Video"	12:42
2.	"Crawling Live Music Video with Multiangles"	4:07
3.	"Mike and Joe's Art Piece"	1:35
4.	"Chester's Tattoos"	1:23
5.	"Crawling Bryson Bluegrass Version" (audio only)	4:06
6.	"High Voltage" (audio only)	3:45
7.	"My December" (audio only)	4:23
8.	"LPTV"	12:22
9.	"Weblink"

== Guest appearances ==
Disturbed members David Draiman and Dan Donegan appears in one scene for the DVD, where Draiman tries to guess how the name "Linkin Park" is pronounced next to Donegan saying "Lick My Part". Slipknot turntablist Sid Wilson appears on the DVD, where he is testing out Joe Hahn's turntables and disc jockeys in one scene. Deftones, including members Chino Moreno and Stephen Carpenter, appear in a few shots of one scene, where they were taking a photo before they played at a concert when Mike Shinoda was going undercover for the KGB, as Chester Bennington explained in one scene for the DVD that (as a joke) they were gonna destroy the Deftones by "...replacing their water...with Vodka...".

== Personnel ==
=== Linkin Park ===
- Chester Bennington – lead vocals
- Rob Bourdon – drums
- Brad Delson – lead guitar
- Joe Hahn – turntables, sampling
- Dave "Phoenix" Farrell – bass
- Mike Shinoda – rap vocals, rhythm guitar, beats, sampling

=== Production ===
- Produced by Bill Berg-Hillinger for Id Playground and Mr. Hahn
- Executive producer: Mr. Hahn
- Edited by Bill Berg-Hillinger
- DVD-video producers: David May for Warner Bros. Records and Angela Smith for Metropolis DVD
- Menu design and animation: Sean Donnelly, Metropolis DVD
- Technical director: James Moore, Metropolis DVD
- DVD authoring by Metropolis DVD, NYC
- Worldwide representation: Rob McDermott for the Firm
- Additional representation by: Carey Segura and Ryan DeMarti
- Booking agent: Mike Arfin for Artist Group International
- Legal: Danny Hayes for Selvern, Mandelbaum and Mintz
- Business manager: Michael Oppenheim and Jonathan Schwartz for Gudvi, Chapnick and Oppenheim
- Photography for package: James Minchin III
- Art direction and design: Tom Peanutz

== Chart performance ==
Chart (2002)	Peak position
Australian Music DVD (ARIA)	7
Swedish Music DVD (Sverigetopplistan)	7
UK Music Videos (Official Charts)	1

== Certifications ==
Region	Certification	Certified units/sales
Australia (ARIA)	Gold	7,500^{^}
Brazil (Pro-Música Brasil)	Gold	25,000^{*}
United Kingdom (BPI)	Gold	25,000^{^}
United States (RIAA)	Platinum	100,000^{^}
^{*} Sales figures based on certification alone.^{^} Shipments figures based on certification alone.
