= Points of Authority =

2001 promotional single by Linkin Park

Promotional single by Linkin Park

from the album Hybrid Theory
- Released: January 17, 2001 (promo)
- Studio: NRG (Los Angeles)
- Genre: Nu metal; rap metal
- Length: 3:23
- Label: Warner Bros.
- Songwriters: Chester Bennington; Rob Bourdon; Brad Delson; Joe Hahn; Mike Shinoda
- Producer: Don Gilmore

Music video
- "Points of Authority" on YouTube

"Points of Authority" is a song by American rock band Linkin Park. It is the fourth track on their first studio album, Hybrid Theory. The song was released in 2001 as a promo release. A CD single for the song was set to be released in the UK in September 2001, but instead, "Papercut" was released as the third single from the album. It was later planned as the fifth official single from the album, planned for a January 2002 release but was cancelled for unknown reasons. In its place, the song's remix version was released. Mike Shinoda's verses originally had different lyrics, while Chester Bennington's parts were no different from in the Hybrid Theory version.

The song's remix "Pts.OF.Athrty" was released as the only single taken from remix album Reanimation (2002) while another remix, by the Crystal Method, was released on LP Underground 2.0. The song is one from the seven Linkin Park's songs that appeared in the mash-up EP Collision Course with American rapper Jay-Z. If the Linkin Park package is downloaded on DJ Hero 2, then players (as DJs) can play with a scratched version of "Pts.OF.Athrty". The song was used in the 2000 Adam Sandler film Little Nicky.

Loudwire said it was the heaviest track by the band. Some journalists consider it to be among the best nu metal tracks.

== Music video ==
The music video was directed by Nathan "Karma" Cox, and it was released in promoting the DVD Frat Party at the Pankake Festival. It shows live presentations by Linkin Park during their tour in 2001.

An alternative video was also released as hidden content in the DVD Frat Party at the Pankake Festival. It was similar to the live version release of "Crawling", recorded at the Dragon Festival in San Bernardino, California on February 3, 2001.

== Track listing ==
EU promo CD
No.	Title	Length
1.	"Points of Authority"	3:22

== Critical reception ==
"Points of Authority" is widely regarded as one of Linkin Park's best songs. In 2017, Billboard ranked the song number seven on their list of the 15 greatest Linkin Park songs, and in 2021, Kerrang ranked the song number eleven on their list of the 20 greatest Linkin Park songs.

== In other media ==
- A demo of the song, entitled "Oh No", appears on LP Underground X: Demos.
- A demo of the song with slightly altered lyrics appears on LP Underground 12.0.
- A remix, entitled "Points of Authority/99 Problems/One Step Closer" appears on Collision Course.

== Pts.OF.Athrty ==
"Pts.OF.Athrty"

Single by Linkin Park

from the album Reanimation
- B-side: "H! Vltg3"; "Buy Myself (Marilyn Manson remix)"
- Released: July 8, 2002
- Genre: Industrial metal
- Length: 3:45 (album version); 3:38 (single version)
- Label: Warner Bros.
- Songwriter: Linkin Park
- Producers: Jay Gordon; Mike Shinoda; Brad Delson (co-production)

Linkin Park singles chronology
"In the End" (2001)	"Pts.OF.Athrty" (2002)	"Somewhere I Belong" (2003)

Music video
- "Pts.OF.Athrty" on YouTube

"Pts.OF.Athrty" is a remix of "Points of Authority" that was released as a single from their remix album, Reanimation. The single features remixes of the Hybrid Theory tracks "Points of Authority", "High Voltage" and "By Myself".

There is also an alternate version of Jay Gordon's remix, which surfaced on a Jay Gordon remix page in 2008.

=== Track listing ===
All tracks are written by Linkin Park.

"Pts.OF.Athrty"
No.	Title	Writer(s)	Length
1.	"Pts.OF.Athrty"		3:36
2.	"Buy Myself (remix of By Myself by Marilyn Manson)"	Linkin Park	4:26
3.	"H! Vltg3"		3:32

"H! Vltg3/Pts.OF.Athrty"
No.	Title	Writer(s)	Length
1.	"H! Vltg3"		3:30
2.	"Pts.OF.Athrty"		3:36
3.	"Buy Myself (remix of By Myself by Marilyn Manson)"	Linkin Park	4:26

=== Music video ===
This remix of "Points of Authority" is renowned for its video, a completely CGI battle between robots, ruled by the heads of Linkin Park members, and an alien race. The heads of all six Linkin Park members are kept in a digital lab equipped with computers and advanced equipment which can be seen extracting something from the heads as Chester Bennington and Mike Shinoda sing. According to director Joe Hahn, the band members' heads are powering the world. At the very end of the video, the commander of the alien race tries to battle the blue tentacles that were released by the members' heads, but gets his gun ripped out of his hand, and is enveloped by them.

Hahn explained that the events of the video took place after the end of the human race and all that is left are the heads of the six Linkin Park members. The video is also said to have been inspired by the dream sequences in the 2001 film Final Fantasy: The Spirits Within. The music video was aired on Cartoon Network's Toonami block as a commercial break (around the year 2002). There is also a video for "Points of Authority" from Hybrid Theory which contains footage of the band playing live. It is featured on the DVD Frat Party at the Pankake Festival.

Another video features the live performance of "Points of Authority" from Linkin Park's live album Live in Texas. The Live in Texas version is available on iTunes, along with "Lying from You". The "Points of Authority" video was not officially uploaded on YouTube by Linkin Park or Warner Records. It is available exclusively on Linkinpark.com. The "Pts.OF.Athrty" music video is available on both Linkin Park and Warner Records YouTube channels.

=== Weekly charts ===
2002 weekly chart performance for "Pts.Of.Athrty"
Chart (2002)	Peak position
Australia (ARIA)	44
Austria (Ö3 Austria Top 40)	47
Canada (Nielsen SoundScan)	4
Germany (GfK)	31
Hungary (Single Top 40)	12
Ireland (IRMA)	25
Netherlands (Dutch Top 40 Tipparade)	3
Netherlands (Single Top 100)	54
Italy (FIMI)	39
Scottish Singles Sales (Official Charts)	6
Sweden (Sverigetopplistan)	45
Switzerland (Schweizer Hitparade)	61
UK Singles (Official Charts)	9
UK Rock & Metal (Official Charts)	1
US Alternative Airplay (Billboard)	29

2017 weekly chart performance for "Pts.Of.Athrty"
Chart (2017)	Peak position
UK Rock & Metal (Official Charts)	6

=== Year-end charts ===
Year-end chart performance for "Pts.Of.Athrty"
Chart (2002)	Position
Canada (Billboard)	59

=== Certifications ===
Certifications for "Pts.Of.Athrty"
Region	Certification	Certified units/sales
New Zealand (RMNZ)	Gold	15,000^{‡}
United Kingdom (BPI)	Silver	200,000^{‡}
^{‡} Sales+streaming figures based on certification alone.

== Credits ==
=== Linkin Park ===
- Chester Bennington – lead vocals
- Mike Shinoda – rapping, keyboards, programming, samples
- Brad Delson – guitar, bass
- Joe Hahn – turntables, samples, synthesizers
- Rob Bourdon – drums

=== Production ===
- Don Gilmore – engineering
- Steve Sisco – engineering
- John Ewing Jr. – additional engineering, Pro Tools
- Matt Griffin – engineering assistance
- Andy Wallace – mixing
- Brian Gardner – audio mastering, digital editing
- Jeff Blue – executive production
