= In the End =

2001 single by Linkin Park

Single by Linkin Park

from the album Hybrid Theory
- B-side: "Step Up"; "In the End" (live BBC Radio One); "Points of Authority" (live at Docklands Arena, London); "A Place for My Head" (live at Docklands Arena); "Pushing Me Away"
- Released: September 11, 2001
- Recorded: 2000
- Genre: Nu metal; rap rock; alternative rock; hard rock
- Length: 3:36
- Label: Warner Bros.
- Songwriters: Brad Delson; Chester Bennington; Joe Hahn; Mike Shinoda; Rob Bourdon
- Producer: Don Gilmore

Linkin Park singles chronology
| "Papercut" (2001) | "In the End" (2001) | "Pts.OF.Athrty" (2002) |

Audio sample
- file; help

Music video
- "In the End" on YouTube

"In the End" is a song by American rock band Linkin Park. It is the eighth track on their debut album, Hybrid Theory (2000), and was released as the album's fourth and final single.

"In the End" received positive reviews by music critics, with most reviewers complimenting the song's signature piano riff, as well as noting rapper Mike Shinoda's vocal prominence in the song. "In the End" also achieved mainstream popularity, and was a commercial success upon release. The song reached the top ten on numerous worldwide music charts and reached number two on the US Billboard Hot 100, the band's highest peak on the chart, as well as their first song that peaked within the top 40 in early 2002, making it a sleeper hit. In 2014, it ranked at number 121 in Blender magazine's The 500 Greatest Songs Since You Were Born. In 2017, Annie Zaleski of Spin named it the fifth best nu metal track of all time. In June 2021, it became the first nu metal song to surpass one billion streams on Spotify. "In the End" has since been certified Diamond (10× Platinum) in their home country by the RIAA.

"In the End" has become one of Linkin Park's most recognizable hits and is considered their signature song. Chester Bennington, the band's lead vocalist, said he initially disliked the song and did not want it to be included on Hybrid Theory. It was remixed on Reanimation as "Enth E ND". The music video of the song, directed by Nathan Cox and the band's turntablist Joe Hahn, featured the band in a fantasy setting.

Ahead of the release for the 20th anniversary reissue for Hybrid Theory, Linkin Park released a demo version of "In the End" as the second single from the re-release of Hybrid Theory on October 1, 2020. In 2026, the song was featured on Grand Theft Auto VI, through the in-game radio station The Chamber 106.6.

== Release ==
"In the End" was shipped to radio on September 11, 2001, and was released commercially October 9, 2001. The single CD was released as a "Part 1" single and a "Part 2" single. They differed in tracks and cover color: the "Part 1" cover is yellow and the "Part 2" cover is red. A DVD version of "In the End" was also released which includes an audio version of "In the End", "Crawling" music video and four 30 seconds interviews.

On March 27, 2002, the single was released in Japan as a 7-track CD called In the End: Live & Rare. It contains live tracks of "Papercut", "Points of Authority," "A Place for My Head", "Step Up" (originally by the early Linkin Park precursor Hybrid Theory that appeared on the Hybrid Theory EP), "My December" and "High Voltage".

== Music video ==
The music video for "In the End" was shot at various stops along the 2001 Ozzfest tour (June – August 2001) and was directed by Nathan Cox and the band's DJ Joe Hahn, who would go on to direct many of Linkin Park's future videos (the two also directed the music video for "Papercut"). Although the background for the "In the End" video was filmed in a California desert, the band itself performed on a studio stage in Los Angeles, with prominent CGI effects and compositing being used to create the finished version. Performing on a studio stage allowed Hahn and Cox to set off water pipes above the stage near the end and drench the band.

The music video takes place in a fantasy setting and uses massive CGI animation. The band performs atop a giant statue that looks to be Egyptian, which has a "winged soldier" on top of it, which looks similar to the winged soldier on the Hybrid Theory cover art.

The portions where Mike Shinoda raps take place first in a wasteland with thorny vines sprouting out of the ground, surrounding him and turning into dust (first verse), and then grass and plants sprouting up around him (second verse). During the time Mike raps his verses, Chester stands atop a platform with gargoyles on the edges. This platform is in front of a door in the shape of a trapezoid. Near the end of the video, the skies turn dark and it begins to rain, and the band performs in the downpour until the end of the song, where the rain stops and the camera pans away from the tower, showing the wasteland where Shinoda had rapped in is now a lush green land. During the rain the statues on the tower begin to move. Mike Shinoda has mentioned that Princess Mononoke inspired the music video.

The video was co-directed by Nathan "Karma" Cox and LP's turntablist Joe Hahn (who have also directed the videos for "Pts.OF.Athrty", "Papercut", "What I've Done", "Bleed It Out", "Shadow of the Day", and "Leave Out All the Rest"). The production design was by Patrick Tatopoulos who helped design and oversee the production of the non-CGI set. It won the "Best Rock Video" and was nominated for Video of the Year at the 2002 MTV Video Music Awards.

The video premiered on MTV and MuchMusic USA the week ending October 6, 2001.

In July 2020, the song became the second music video by the band to surpass one billion views, after "Numb". In April 2025, the music video became the second by the band to achieve 2 billion views on the platform.

== Critical reception ==
"In the End" received positive reviews by contemporary rock music critics. VH1 ranked it number 84 on its list of the 100 Greatest Songs of the '00s. The song was also ranked number two by Loudwire on its list of "Top 21st century Hard Rock songs". At Stylus magazine, it was highlighted as a "nu metal classic". At Kerrang, it was included as part of "The Ultimate Nu Metal Mixtape". NME, however, was more critical of the song, calling it "...another slab of gormless MTV rap rock from the bottom of the food chain".

=== Accolades ===
In 2015, the song was named as the best rock song in Kerrang!'s Rock 100 list followed by the band's 2014 single "Final Masquerade". After Bennington's 2017 death, Billboard named "In the End" as the best Linkin Park song and labelled it as one of the best pop songs of the 21st century. In the same year, it was listed as the 133rd best alternative rock hit of all time by Consequence. In 2017, Billboard ranked the song number one on their list of the 15 greatest Linkin Park songs, and in 2021, Kerrang ranked the song number two on their list of the 20 greatest Linkin Park songs. In 2026, Rolling Stone ranked the song number 103 on their list of the best 200 rock songs of the 21st century.

== Chart performance ==
"In the End" is Linkin Park's highest-charting single in the US, debuting at number 78 and peaking at number two on the US Billboard Hot 100 chart in March 2002. It stayed on the chart a total of 38 weeks. It reached number one on the Modern Rock Tracks chart for five weeks, starting in December 2001, becoming their first hit on this chart. It has spent 44 weeks there, becoming their longest running on that chart and it also hit number three on the Mainstream Rock Tracks chart spending 40 weeks on the chart, their second longest after "One Step Closer" at 42 weeks. It also reached number one on the Pop Songs chart for five weeks also and it stayed on the chart for 27 weeks. "In the End" was the seventh best performing single on the Billboard Hot 100 during 2002, and was the second best performing rock song and alternative song of the decade on the Alternative Songs chart and the Rock Songs chart only behind Trapt's "Headstrong" and Nickelback's "How You Remind Me" respectively. As of June 2014, the single has sold 2,555,000 copies in the United States. On February 27, 2024, the single was certified Diamond in the United States by the RIAA.

"In the End" reached the top five on the Canadian BDS Airplay chart and remained in the top five for another month. "In the End" debuted higher on the Canadian Hot 100 than it did in the US and peaked at number one three weeks later for two weeks. It peaked higher in Canada than "Papercut".

The song was released in Australia, Europe and New Zealand on December 22, 2001. "One Step Closer", "Papercut" and "Crawling" reached the UK top 20, while "In the End" reached the top 10. "In the End" continued the trend of higher-charting singles when it debuted and peaked at number eight. It remained in the top 100 of the chart for 20 non-consecutive weeks.

"In the End" debuted at number 44 on December 2, 2001, on the ARIA Charts. It steadily rose to peak at number four on February 10, 2002. It is currently the second most successful song for the band in Australia, tied with "One Step Closer" and behind "New Divide". In the week starting July 30, 2017, the single re-entered the charts, at number 10, more than 15 years since the song last appeared in the top 50, following the death of lead singer Chester Bennington.

"In the End" reached the top 30 in Switzerland and the top 20 in the Netherlands, Ireland, Germany, Belgium and New Zealand. It is also their first single to chart in France, peaking initially at number 40 and remaining in the chart for 17 weeks. But after the suicide of Chester Bennington in July 2017, the song charted at number 23 for one week. Similarly, it also re-entered the UK chart at number 14 on week starting July 30, 2017.

== Remixes ==
The song was remixed with "Izzo (H.O.V.A.)" by hip hop artist Jay-Z on their collaborative extended play, Collision Course, and uses the sample "Izzo (H.O.V.A.)" uses of the Jackson 5's "I Want You Back" at the original speed of the beat.

A remix of "In the End", titled "Enth E ND", is included on their remix album Reanimation. The song features hip hop artists Motion Man and KutMasta Kurt. Opposed from the song being a remix, the song also differs with altered lyrics. The song was released as a promotional single with "FRGT/10".

The music video was directed by Jason Goldwatch. It starts off in black and white with someone picking up headphones, interrupted by an image – Mike Shinoda in a car, a flashing image with the letters "LP" written on it, and a TV screen. KutMasta Kurt is shown DJing, then Motion Man is seen in a car, rapping. The camera goes to Mike Shinoda and the video is now in color. The video zooms out to a small screen, then the video becomes black and white again. Mike Shinoda is seen driving a car with KurtMasta Kurt and Motion Man. The video shows the screen again and Mike is seen in color, then becomes black and white again. Mike Shinoda and Motion Man are seen bouncing their heads on screen, then seen driving again. Images flash and Motion Man is seen rapping once again. Random clips are played and Mike Shinoda is once again seen driving, holding a small wired camera.

The Memphis rap group Three Six Mafia sampled this song on their 2001 song "Smoke Dat Weed" and it is featured on Juicy J's 2002 album Chronicles of the Juice Man.

In 2017, producer Markus Schulz made a trance remix of "In the End" as a tribute to Chester Bennington after the latter's death, which he debuted at Tomorrowland.

Recorded producer Tommee Profitt, performed by singers Fleurie and Jung Youth, covered the song in 2019. It received a gold certification from both the RIAA and Recorded Music NZ.

== In popular culture ==
Upon the release of the series finale of Netflix's Stranger Things on December 31, 2025, part of the episode's setting drew comparisons to that of the music video for "In the End" by fans, sparking a resurgence of the song after being used in viral Internet memes. The music video director, Nathan Cox, called the memes "hilarious" while admitting the resemblance between the two. The band themselves responded by incorporating the Stranger Things theme song prior to performing "In the End" at the Asian shows of the From Zero World Tour.

== Track listing ==
All tracks are written by Linkin Park, except where noted.

Part 1
| No. | Title | Length |
|---|---|---|
| 1. | "In the End" | 3:38 |
| 2. | "In the End" (Live BBC Radio One) | 3:28 |
| 3. | "Points of Authority" (Live at Docklands Arena, London) | 3:31 |
| 4. | "In the End" (Video) | 3:36 |

Part 2
| No. | Title | Writer(s) | Length |
|---|---|---|---|
| 1. | "In the End" | | 3:38 |
| 2. | "A Place for My Head" (Live at Docklands Arena, London) | Linkin Park; Mark Wakefield; Dave Farrell | 3:12 |
| 3. | "Step Up" | Mike Shinoda; Joe Hahn; Brad Delson | 3:54 |

DVD
| No. | Title | Length |
|---|---|---|
| 1. | "In the End" (Audio) | 3:37 |
| 2. | "Crawling" (Music Video) | 3:38 |
| 3. | "4 X 30 Seconds" | 2:14 |

In the End: Live & Rare
| No. | Title | Writer(s) | Length |
|---|---|---|---|
| 1. | "In the End" (Album Version) | | 3:36 |
| 2. | "Papercut" (Live at Docklands Arena, London) | | 3:11 |
| 3. | "Points of Authority" (Live at Docklands Arena, London) | | 3:26 |
| 4. | "A Place for My Head" (Live at Docklands Arena, London) | Linkin Park; Wakefield; Farrell | 3:10 |
| 5. | "Step Up" | Shinoda; Hahn; Delson | 3:55 |
| 6. | "My December" | Shinoda | 4:21 |
| 7. | "High Voltage" | | 3:45 |

== Personnel ==
Linkin Park

- Chester Bennington – vocals
- Mike Shinoda – rap vocals, piano, sampler, beats programming
- Brad Delson – guitars, bass
- Joe Hahn – sampler, turntables
- Rob Bourdon – drums

Production

- Produced by Don Gilmore
- Executive producer: Jeff Blue
- Mixed at Soundtrack, NYC

== Charts ==
=== Weekly charts ===
2001–2002 weekly chart performance for "In the End"
| Chart (2001–2002) | Peak position |
|---|---|
| Australia (ARIA) | 4 |
| Austria (Ö3 Austria Top 40) | 6 |
| Belgium (Ultratop 50 Flanders) | 12 |
| Belgium (Ultratop 50 Wallonia) | 26 |
| Canada CHR (Nielsen BDS) | 4 |
| Croatia (HRT) | 8 |
| Denmark (Tracklisten) | 3 |
| Europe (Eurochart Hot 100) | 14 |
| France (SNEP) | 40 |
| Germany (GfK) | 4 |
| Ireland (IRMA) | 16 |
| Italy (FIMI) | 5 |
| Netherlands (Dutch Top 40) | 5 |
| Netherlands (Single Top 100) | 11 |
| New Zealand (Recorded Music NZ) | 10 |
| Romania (Romanian Top 100) | 99 |
| Scottish Singles Sales (Official Charts) | 7 |
| Sweden (Sverigetopplistan) | 3 |
| Switzerland (Schweizer Hitparade) | 4 |
| UK Singles (Official Charts) | 8 |
| UK Airplay (Music Week) | 49 |
| UK Rock & Metal (Official Charts) | 1 |
| US Billboard Hot 100 | 2 |
| US Adult Pop Airplay (Billboard) | 15 |
| US Alternative Airplay (Billboard) | 1 |
| US Mainstream Rock Airplay (Billboard) | 3 |
| US Pop Airplay (Billboard) | 1 |

2017 weekly chart performance for "In the End"
| Chart (2017) | Peak position |
|---|---|
| Australia Digital Singles (ARIA) | 8 |
| Austria (Ö3 Austria Top 40) | 4 |
| Canada Hot 100 (Billboard) | 30 |
| Canada Digital Songs (Billboard) | 10 |
| Czech Republic Singles Digital (ČNS IFPI) | 8 |
| Finland (Suomen virallinen lista) | 19 |
| France (SNEP) | 23 |
| Germany (GfK) | 4 |
| Hungary (Single Top 40) | 5 |
| Hungary (Stream Top 40) | 5 |
| Malaysia (RIM) | 11 |
| Portugal (AFP) | 21 |
| Slovakia Singles Digital (ČNS IFPI) | 16 |
| Spain (Promusicae) | 33 |
| Switzerland (Schweizer Hitparade) | 4 |
| UK Singles (OCC) | 14 |
| US Billboard Hot 100 | 37 |
| US Hot Rock & Alternative Songs (Billboard) | 3 |

2020–2026 weekly chart performance for "In the End"
| Chart (2020–2026) | Peak position |
|---|---|
| Brazil Hot 100 (Billboard) | 76 |
| Czech Republic Singles Digital (ČNS IFPI) | 25 |
| Finland Airplay (Radiosoittolista) | 63 |
| Global 200 (Billboard) | 45 |
| Greece International (IFPI) | 65 |
| Poland Airplay (OLiS) | 89 |

=== Monthly charts ===
Monthly chart performance for "In the End"
| Chart (2024) | Position |
|---|---|
| Czech Republic (Singles Digitál – Top 100) | 38 |

=== Year-end charts ===
2001 year-end chart performance for "In the End"
| Chart (2001) | Position |
|---|---|
| Germany (Media Control) | 94 |
| Sweden (Hitlistan) | 30 |
| UK Singles (OCC) | 131 |
| US Modern Rock Tracks (Billboard) | 35 |

2002 year-end chart performance for "In the End"
| Chart (2002) | Position |
|---|---|
| Australia (ARIA) | 46 |
| Belgium (Ultratop 50 Flanders) | 83 |
| Brazil (Crowley) | 4 |
| Canada Radio (Billboard) | 12 |
| Europe (Eurochart Hot 100 Singles) | 89 |
| Italy (FIMI) | 31 |
| Netherlands (Dutch Top 40) | 50 |
| Netherlands (Single Top 100) | 27 |
| US Billboard Hot 100 | 7 |
| US Mainstream Rock Tracks (Billboard) | 8 |
| US Modern Rock Tracks (Billboard) | 2 |

2017 year-end chart performance for "In the End"
| Chart (2017) | Position |
|---|---|
| US Hot Rock Songs (Billboard) | 31 |

2021 year-end chart performance for "In the End"
| Chart (2021) | Position |
|---|---|
| Portugal (AFP) | 186 |

2024 year-end chart performance for "In the End"
| Chart (2024) | Position |
|---|---|
| Global 200 (Billboard) | 101 |
| Portugal (AFP) | 78 |

2025 year-end chart performance for "In the End"
| Chart (2025) | Position |
|---|---|
| Austria (Ö3 Austria Top 40) | 39 |
| Germany (GfK) | 27 |
| Global 200 (Billboard) | 52 |
| Switzerland (Schweizer Hitparade) | 57 |

=== Decade-end charts ===
Decade-end chart performance for "In the End"
| Chart (2000–2009) | Peak position |
|---|---|
| US Hot Alternative Songs (Billboard) | 2 |
| US Hot Rock Songs (Billboard) | 2 |
| US Pop Songs (Billboard) | 36 |
| US Radio Songs (Billboard) | 65 |

== Certifications ==
Certifications and sales for "In the End"
| Region | Certification | Certified units/sales |
|---|---|---|
| Australia (ARIA) | Gold | 35,000^{^} |
| Denmark (IFPI Danmark) | 2× Platinum | 180,000^{‡} |
| Germany (BVMI) | 3× Platinum | 1,800,000^{‡} |
| Italy (FIMI) | 4× Platinum | 400,000^{‡} |
| New Zealand (RMNZ) | 6× Platinum | 180,000^{‡} |
| Portugal (AFP) | 6× Platinum | 60,000^{‡} |
| Spain (Promusicae) | 2× Platinum | 120,000^{‡} |
| Sweden (GLF) | Gold | 15,000^{^} |
| Switzerland (IFPI Switzerland) | Gold | 20,000^{^} |
| United Kingdom (BPI) | 5× Platinum | 3,000,000^{‡} |
| United States (RIAA) | Diamond | 10,000,000^{‡} |
Streaming
| Denmark (IFPI Danmark) | Gold | 900,000^{†} |
| Greece (IFPI Greece) | 3× Platinum | 6,000,000^{†} |
^{^} Shipments figures based on certification alone.^{‡} Sales+streaming figures based on certification alone.^{†} Streaming-only figures based on certification alone.

== Release history ==
Release dates and formats for "In the End"
| Region | Date | Format | Ref. |
|---|---|---|---|
| United States | September 11, 2001 | Rock radio; active rock radio; alternative radio | |
| United Kingdom | October 9, 2001 | CD; DVD | |
| Australia | November 19, 2001 | CD1 | |
| Australia | November 26, 2001 | DVD | |
| Australia | December 3, 2001 | CD2 | |
| Japan | March 27, 2002 | Mini-album | |
