= Reanimation (Linkin Park album) =

Remix album by Linkin Park
- Released: July 30, 2002
- Recorded: 2001–2002
- Studios: Various: Tracks 1, 6 and 12 recorded at The Stockroom. Track 2 recorded at Division One Studios. Track 3 recorded at Total Recall Studios & The Stockroom. Track 5 recorded at The Stockroom & DND Studios. Track 7 recorded at Blue Room Studios & The Stockroom. Track 8 recorded at Adiar Cor Studios & The Studio. Additional Recording at Purple Velvet Studios. Track 9 recorded and mixed at American Recordings and The Cutting Room Studios, New York, NY. Pharoahe Monch's vocals recorded at The Cutting Room Studios and Millenia Music. Track 11 recorded at The Stockroom & Joe's Parents' House. Track 13 recorded at The Pressbox Studios. Track 14 recorded at Rowena Projects & The Stockroom. Track 15 recorded at The Stockroom, Rowena Projects & Olympic Studios. Track 18 recorded at Joe's Parents' House. Track 19 recorded at The Humble Bros. Studio, Korn Studios (Los Angeles) & The Stockroom. Track 20 recorded at The Stockroom & Bus #2.
- Genres: Nu metal; rap metal; rap rock; hip-hop; electronic
- Length: 60:52
- Label: Warner Bros.
- Producer: Mike Shinoda

Linkin Park chronology
Hybrid Theory (2000)	Reanimation (2002)	Meteora (2003)

Singles from Reanimation
- 1. "Pts.OF.Athrty" Released: July 8, 2002

Reanimation (stylized as [REAИIMATIOИ]) is the debut remix album by American rock band Linkin Park, released on July 30, 2002, through Warner Bros. Records, as a follow-up to their 2000 debut studio album, Hybrid Theory. Recorded during the Hybrid Theory tour, it features remixes of songs from Hybrid Theory, including the album's bonus tracks. It was produced by Mike Shinoda and mixed by Mark "Spike" Stent. It is the fourth-best-selling remix album of all time.

== Release and promotion ==
=== Singles ===
"Pts.OF.Athrty", the remix of "Points of Authority" by Jay Gordon of Orgy, was released as the first and only official single from Reanimation. The single also features B-sides "H! Vltg3", the remix of "High Voltage" by Evidence and DJ Babu featuring additional vocals by Pharoahe Monch, as well as a remix of "By Myself", entitled "Buy Myself", by American musician Marilyn Manson.

"Enth E Nd", "Frgt/10", "Songs from Reanimation" and "My<Dsmbr" were released as radio promotional singles.

=== Music videos ===
The official video for "Pts.OF.Athrty" depicts an animated battle between robots, ruled by the heads of Linkin Park members, and an alien race.

MTV2 made videos for each song of the album for its playback of the album on "MTV:Playback" which aired only a few times. These include: "Opening" (a girl going to bed), "Pts.OF.Athrty" (the US flag up to 1:05, then a motorcycle chase), "Enth E Nd" (Mike Shinoda, KutMasta Kurt and Motion Man performing their respective parts and verses in the back of a car. This was the only video to show the actual performers of the song), "[Chali]" (the girl in bed and shots of her room), "Frgt/10" (the girl from the "Opening" doing graffiti in a town while evading the police chopper), "P5hng Me A*wy" (a cannibal at work), "Plc. 4 Mie Hæd" (the girl singing to the song), "X-Ecutioner Style" (a cartoon boy walking around town, singing Chester's "Shut Up" parts), "H! Vltg3" (a night in the life of a man), "[Riff Raff]" (the girl in bed), "Wth>You" (very quick montage of Mugshots of people in sync with the song), "Ntr\Mssion" (the girl in bed), "Ppr:Kut" (shots of people's reactions to an unexpected loud noise while listening to music; Joe Hahn made a cameo appearance in this video), "Rnw@y" (a woman with a Mohawk in town, running in each chorus of the song), My<Dsmbr (a man obviously lives on the beach and does some amusements in an amusement park), "[Stef]" (the girl in bed), "By_Myslf" (a woman in a forest), "Kyur4 th Ich" (people breakdancing, Joe Hahn made another appearance as his cameo), "1Stp Klosr" (depicts a failing relationship), and "Krwlng" (animation of a white stick man).

Only the MTV2 videos of "Frgt/10" and "Kyur4 th Ich" were officially released on the DVD-A edition of the album, along with the official "Pts.OF.Athrty" video. The videos of "Pts.OF.Athrty", "Enth E Nd", "Frgt/10", and "Kyur4 th Ich" were the only videos to be considered "official".

=== Editions ===
Reanimation's standard edition came in a digipak case with 20 tracks. The Japanese edition included "Buy Myself" as a bonus track. The iTunes release, in addition to "Buy Myself", also included live recordings of "One Step Closer" and "My December", originally released as B-sides for "Faint" and "Somewhere I Belong" respectively.

Also released was a DVD-A version with surround sound and music videos for "Pts.Of.Athrty", "Frgt/10", and "Kyur4 Th Ich". Linkin Park Underground 1.0 members received the DVD-A edition for free as a Christmas gift.

A test release of a DualDisc version was sold in Boston and Seattle only. This edition contained the album on one side of the disc and special content on the other. It never progressed beyond the test run and thus the DualDisc edition is difficult to obtain.

The entire album was later re-released in 2020 on CD, vinyl and digital format as part of the 20th Anniversary Edition of Hybrid Theory, with "Buy Myself" also released as part of the boxset's B-Side Rarities collection.

== Critical reception ==
Professional ratings
Aggregate scores
Source	Rating
Metacritic	60/100
Review scores
Source	Rating
AllMusic	3/5 stars
Blender	3/5 stars
Dotmusic	1.5/5 stars
Entertainment Weekly	B−
The Guardian	3/5 stars
NME	6/10
Q	2/5 stars
RapReviews	7.5/10
Rolling Stone	3/5 stars
Spin	7/10

According to the review aggregator Metacritic, Reanimation received "mixed or average reviews" based on a weighted average score of 60 out of 100 from 14 critic scores. It helped the many underground hip-hop artists that it featured reach a larger audience, as well as changing the nature of the work so significantly (restructuring songs, adding or substantially changing verses, and adding several guest artists) that it could be considered an entirely new album. Reviewer Stephen Thomas Erlewine of AllMusic considered the album "a welcome step in the right direction," and he praised Reanimation for attempting to break new ground. Will Hermes of Spin found that "ultimate, the set is a little schizo" finding it "channels enough rap-rock frisson to make it more than just a between-albums snack."

The album debuted and peaked at #2 on the Billboard 200 behind The Rising by Bruce Springsteen and stayed on the list for 33 straight weeks. It sold 270,000 copies in its debut week., and nearly two million overall. It became the fourth best-selling remix album of all time.

== In popular culture ==
At the 2010 Vancouver Winter Olympics, British ice dancers Sinead and John Kerr skated to "Krwlng".

In 2011, magician Dynamo walked across the Thames River. This was shown during his TV show Dynamo: Magician Impossible while the song "Krwlng" played over it.

== Track listing ==
All tracks are written by Linkin Park, except where noted.

No.	Title	Writer(s)	Hybrid Theory original track	Length
1.	"Opening"	Mike Shinoda		1:07
2.	"Pts.OF.Athrty" (featuring Jay Gordon)		"Points of Authority"	3:45
3.	"Enth E Nd" (featuring KutMasta Kurt and Motion Man)		"In the End"	4:03
4.	"[Chali]" (skit)			0:23
5.	"Frgt/10" (featuring Alchemist and Chali 2na)	Linkin Park; Mark Wakefield; Dave Farrell	"Forgotten"	3:32
6.	"P5hng Me A*wy" (featuring Stephen Richards)		"Pushing Me Away"	4:37
7.	"Plc.4 Mie Hæd" (featuring Amp Live and Zion)	Linkin Park; Mark Wakefield; Dave Farrell	"A Place for My Head"	4:20
8.	"X-Ecutioner Style" (featuring Sean C, Roc Raida and Black Thought)		"One Step Closer", "Forgotten" and "Cure For The Itch"	1:49
9.	"H! Vltg3" (featuring Evidence, Pharoahe Monch and DJ Babu)	Linkin Park; Derek Murphy; Lorenzo Dechalus; Maxwell Dixon	"High Voltage"	3:30
10.	"[Riff Raff]" (skit)			0:21
11.	"Wth>You" (featuring Aceyalone)	Linkin Park; Dust Brothers	"With You"	4:12
12.	"Ntr\Mssion" (skit)	Mike Shinoda		0:29
13.	"Ppr:Kut" (featuring Cheapshot, Jubacca, Rasco and Planet Asia)		"Papercut"	3:26
14.	"Rnw@y" (featuring Backyard Bangers and Phoenix Orion)	Linkin Park; Mark Wakefield	"Runaway"	3:13
15.	"My<Dsmbr" (featuring Mickey P. and Kelli Ali)		"My December"	4:18
16.	"[Stef]" (skit)			0:10
17.	"By_Myslf" (featuring Josh Abraham and Mike Shinoda)		"By Myself"	3:42
18.	"Kyur4 th Ich"		"Cure for the Itch"	2:32
19.	"1Stp Klosr" (featuring The Humble Brothers and Jonathan Davis)		"One Step Closer"	5:46
20.	"Krwlng" (featuring Aaron Lewis)		"Crawling"	5:40
Total length:				60:55

Japanese edition bonus track
No.	Title	Writer(s)	Length
21.	"Buy Myself" (Marilyn Manson Remix)	Linkin Park	4:27

iTunes edition bonus tracks
No.	Title	Writer(s)	Length
21.	"One Step Closer" (Live LP Underground Tour 2003)	Linkin Park	3:42
22.	"Buy Myself" (Marilyn Manson Remix) (non-album track)	Linkin Park	4:27
23.	"My December" (Live Projekt Revolution Tour 2002)	Mike Shinoda	4:27

Reanimation – The Video Album
No.	Title	Director	Length
1.	"Opening"	Joe Hahn	1:07
2.	"Pts.OF.Athrty"	Joe Hahn	3:45
3.	"Enth E ND"	Jason Goldwatch	4:00
4.	"[Chali]"	Joe Hahn	0:23
5.	"Frgt/10"	Joshua Cordes	3:32
6.	"P5hng Me A*wy"	Scott Patton	4:38
7.	"Plc.4 Mie Hæd"	Shawn M.Foster	4:20
8.	"X-Ecutioner Style"	David Zager	1:49
9.	"H! Vltg3"	Estevan Oriol	3:30
10.	"[Riff Raff]"	Joe Hahn	0:21
11.	"Wth>You"	Ryan Thompson	4:12
12.	"Ntr\Mssion"	Joe Hahn	0:29
13.	"Ppr:Kut"	Mike Piscatelli	3:26
14.	"Rnw@y"	Kimo Proudfoot	3:13
15.	"My<Dsmbr"	Chip Miller	4:17
16.	"[Stef]"	Joe Hahn	0:10
17.	"By_Myslf"	Matt Bass	3:42
18.	"Kyur4 th Ich"	Joe Hahn	2:32
19.	"1Stp Klosr"	Shaun Smith	5:46
20.	"Krwlng"	Jonathan Ruppel	5:40
Total length:			60:52

=== iTunes ===
The videos for "Pts.OF.Athrty", "Frgt/10" and "Kyur4 Th Ich" are the only videos of Reanimation to be available for purchase on iTunes.

=== Outtakes ===
Remixes were also crafted by Tricky, Prince Paul, DJ Z-Trip, and Team Sleep ("My December").

Tracks 1, 4, 9, 10, 12, 15, and 16 do not contain elements of a song on the standard edition of Hybrid Theory. Tracks 9 and 15 are remixes of Hybrid Theory B-sides, while the rest were created specifically for Reanimation.

== Charts ==
=== Weekly charts ===
2002 weekly chart performance for Reanimation
Chart (2002)	Peak position
Australian Albums (ARIA)	16
Austrian Albums (Ö3 Austria)	2
Belgian Albums (Ultratop Flanders)	12
Belgian Albums (Ultratop Wallonia)	11
Canadian Albums (Billboard)	3
Danish Albums (Hitlisten)	24
Dutch Albums (Album Top 100)	4
European Albums (Music & Media)	4
Finnish Albums (Suomen virallinen lista)	12
French Albums (SNEP)	11
German Albums (Offizielle Top 100)	3
Hungarian Albums (MAHASZ)	14
Irish Albums (IRMA)	4
Italian Albums (FIMI)	25
Malaysian Albums (RIM)	1
New Zealand Albums (RMNZ)	8
Norwegian Albums (VG-lista)	32
Polish Albums (ZPAV)	10
Scottish Albums (Official Charts)	5
Singaporean Albums (RIAS)	1
Spanish Albums (AFYVE)	20
Swedish Albums (Sverigetopplistan)	18
Swiss Albums (Schweizer Hitparade)	3
UK Albums (Official Charts)	3
UK Rock & Metal Albums (Official Charts)	2
US Billboard 200	2

2017 weekly chart performance for Reanimation
Chart (2017)	Peak position
Czech Albums (ČNS IFPI)	44

=== Year-end charts ===
Year-end chart performance for Reanimation
Chart (2002)	Position
Austrian Albums (Ö3 Austria)	51
Canadian Albums (Nielsen SoundScan)	96
Canadian Alternative Albums (Nielsen SoundScan)	29
Canadian Metal Albums (Nielsen SoundScan)	14
European Albums (Music & Media)	66
French Albums (SNEP)	110
German Albums (Offizielle Top 100)	58
New Zealand Albums (RMNZ)	44
Swiss Albums (Schweizer Hitparade)	77
UK Albums (OCC)	115
US Billboard 200	70
Worldwide Albums (IFPI)	39

== Certifications ==
Certifications and sales for Reanimation
Region	Certification	Certified units/sales
Argentina (CAPIF)	Gold	20,000^{^}
Australia (ARIA)	Gold	35,000^{^}
Austria (IFPI Austria)	Gold	15,000^{*}
Brazil (Pro-Música Brasil)	Gold	50,000^{*}
Germany (BVMI)	Gold	150,000^{^}
New Zealand (RMNZ)	Gold	7,500^{^}
Spain (Promusicae)	Gold	50,000^{^}
Switzerland (IFPI Switzerland)	Gold	20,000^{^}
United Kingdom (BPI)	Platinum	300,000^{‡}
United States (RIAA)	Platinum	1,900,000
^{*} Sales figures based on certification alone.^{^} Shipments figures based on certification alone.^{‡} Sales+streaming figures based on certification alone.

== Personnel ==
Linkin Park

- Chester Bennington – lead vocals
- Rob Bourdon – drums, percussion
- Brad Delson – lead guitar
- Dave "Phoenix" Farrell – bass; violin and cello on "Opening" and "Krwlng"
- Joe Hahn – turntables, samples, programming; scratching on "Frgt/10"
- Mike Shinoda – co-lead and rap vocals, rhythm guitar on "P5hng Me A*wy" and "Wth>You"; keyboards, piano, samplers

Production

- Don Gilmore – production (original recordings)
- Andy Wallace – mixing (original recordings)
- Mike Shinoda – production, art direction, design, art
- Mark "Spike" Stent – mixing
- David Treahearn – assistant mixing
- Paul "P-Dub" Walton – ProTools engineering
- Brian "Big Bass" Gardner – mastering, digital editing
- Nancie Stern – sample clearance
- Tom Whalley – A&R
- Kevin Sakoda – A&R, marketing direction
- Jeff Blue – A&R
- Natalie Preston – A&R coordination
- Peter Standish – marketing direction
- Rob McDermott – worldwide representation
- Clay Patrick McBride – photography
- Flem – art direction, design
- Joe Hahn – art

Additional musicians and interpretations

- Jay Gordon – interpretation on "Pts.OF.Athrty"
- Nova – programming, interpretation on "Pts.OF.Athrty"
- Doug Trantow – additional programming, additional producer, engineer on "Pts.OF.Athrty"
- KutMasta Kurt – interpretation on "Enth E Nd"
- Motion Man – vocals on "Enth E Nd"
- The Alchemist – interpretation on "Frgt/10"
- Chali 2na – vocals on "Frgt/10"
- Stephen Richards – vocals on "P5hng Me A*wy"
- AmpLive – interpretation on "Plc.4 Mie Hæd"
- Baba Zumbi – vocals on "Plc.4 Mie Hæd"
- Sean C – producer on "X-Ecutioner Style"
- Roc Raida – interpretation on "X-Ecutioner Style"
- Black Thought – vocals on "X-Ecutioner Style"
- Jeff Chestek – engineer on "X-Ecutioner Style"
- Ray Wilson – assistant engineer on "X-Ecutioner Style"
- Evidence – interpretation on "H! Vltg3"
- Pharoahe Monch – vocals on "H! Vltg3"
- DJ Babu – cut on "H! Vltg3"
- Porse 1 – additional production on "H! Vltg3"
- DJ Revolution – editing on "H! Vltg3"
- Troy Staton – mixing on "H! Vltg3"
- Aceyalone – vocals on "Wth>You"
- Cheapshot – interpretation on "Ppr:Kut"
- Jubacca (Vin Skully) – interpretation on "Ppr:Kut"
- Rasco – vocals on "Ppr:Kut"
- Planet Asia – vocals on "Ppr:Kut"
- Josh Kouzomis – interpretation on "Rnw@y"
- E.Moss – interpretation on "Rnw@y"
- Phoenix Orion – vocals on "Rnw@y"
- Mickey Petralia – additional production on "Rnw@y"; keyboards, programming, producer, interpretation on "My<Dsmbr"
- Michael Fitzpatrick – programming, interpretation on "My<Dsmbr"
- Kelli Ali – vocals on "My<Dsmbr"
- Greg Kurstin – keyboards on "My<Dsmbr"
- Josh Abraham – interpretation on "By_Myslf"
- Stephen Carpenter – guitar on "By_Myslf"
- Ryan Williams – engineer on "By_Myslf"
- Jonas G. – engineer on "By_Myslf"
- Erik Gregory – programming on "By_Myslf"
- The Humble Brothers – interpretation on "1stp Klosr"
- Jonathan Davis – vocals on "1stp Klosr"
- Aaron Lewis – vocals on "Krwlng"
- Marilyn Manson – interpretation and keyboards on "Buy Myself"
- John 5 – guitar on "Buy Myself"
- Madonna Wayne Gacy – keyboards on "Buy Myself"
- Tim Sköld – co-producer, engineer, mixing, programming on "Buy Myself"
