= Papercut (Linkin Park song) =

2001 single by Linkin Park

Single by Linkin Park

from the album Hybrid Theory
- B-side: "Points of Authority" (live); "Papercut" (live)
- Released: June 18, 2001
- Studio: NRG (Los Angeles)
- Genre: Nu metal; rap metal; rap rock
- Length: 3:05
- Label: Warner Bros.
- Songwriters: Chester Bennington; Rob Bourdon; Brad Delson; Joe Hahn; Mike Shinoda
- Producer: Don Gilmore

Linkin Park singles chronology
"Crawling" (2000)	"Papercut" (2001)	"In the End" (2001)

Audio sample
- file; help

Music video
- "Papercut" on YouTube

"Papercut" is a song by American rock band Linkin Park. It was released as the third single from their debut album Hybrid Theory (2000) and appears as the opening track on the record. It combines multiple genres in a way that Chester Bennington said captured the essence of the band. He also said it was one of his favorite Linkin Park tracks. The song reached number 14 on the UK Singles Chart, and was certified Gold by the Recording Industry Association of America.

== Composition and lyrics ==
Rolling Stone described the track as opening the album with a hip-hop beat that gives way to "4-bit-infused alt-rock heaviness". Mike Shinoda says the song combines three genres within its first 20 seconds: a beat inspired by Timbaland, nu-metal style guitars, and drum and bass.

Chester Bennington said of the song:

In the beginning, my whole goal was to bring as much melody as I could to the music [...] The band was really, really good at doing the hip-hop thing, and really good at writing rock music, but there hadn’t been a lot of melody [before] I joined. [...] When we got to that song, the chorus was so dope and the words behind it were so cool, that I didn’t need to do much melodically until we flipped it up at the end. That was a lot of fun; I felt like that song really captured what the vibe of the band’s about.

Before his death, Bennington stated multiple times that "Papercut" was one of his favorite Linkin Park songs.

== Release ==
"Papercut" is the opening track on the band's debut album Hybrid Theory. It was released on 18 June 2001 as the third single from the record. The band's previous single, "Crawling", included a live performance of the track as a B-side.

The song has also been released in various forms as remixes. Linkin Park's remix album Reanimation (2002) features a version of "Papercut" remixed by Cheapshot and entitled "Ppr:Kut". The band's EP collaborating with Jay-Z, Collision Course (2004) features a mash up of the track with Jay-Z's "Big Pimpin'".

== Music video ==
The music video for the song was co-directed by Nathan "Karma" Cox. It shows the band performing in the lounge of an upscale house. Kerrang! describes the room next door as appearing "darker, twisted, shadowy". In this room a chrysalis is generated and hundreds of dragonflies emerge, referencing the cover art of Hybrid Theory. The room then begins to shape-shift around the band with faces coming through the wall. The song's lyrics appear scrawled along the walls in the darker room. Brad Delson and Dave Farrell both appear playing acoustic instruments.

Mike Shinoda reflected in 2021, "The only thing about that song that didn’t age well, in retrospect, is the video". He explains that it was made at a difficult time for the band when they were frequently getting into disagreements, so he chose not to give his views on Chester Bennington's outfit. He also comments, "The special effects are goofy [...] It’s not a terrible video, I think we’ve made worse, but when I watch it now, I look like a fucking idiot and I don’t know what’s going on".

== Chart performance ==
The song reached number 14 on the UK Singles Chart in 2001 and was in the chart for 6 weeks. It also reached number 32 on the Modern Rock Tracks Chart in 2002. The song was certified Gold by the Recording Industry Association of America in 2017, for digital sales of 500,000 units.

== Track listing ==
All tracks are written by Linkin Park.

No.	Title	Length
1.	"Papercut"	3:05
2.	"Points of Authority" (Live)	3:25
3.	"Papercut" (Live)	3:12
4.	"Papercut" (Video)	3:13

== Personnel ==
Linkin Park

- Chester Bennington – lead vocals
- Mike Shinoda – rap vocals
- Brad Delson – guitars
- Joe Hahn – turntables, sampler
- Rob Bourdon – drums

Additional musician

- Ian Hornbeck – bass

== Charts ==
=== Weekly charts ===
2001–2002 weekly chart performance for "Papercut"
Chart (2001–2002)	Peak position
Australia (ARIA)	87
Austria (Ö3 Austria Top 40)	43
Germany (GfK)	49
Ireland (IRMA)	27
Netherlands (Single Top 100)	39
Scottish Singles Sales (Official Charts)	10
Switzerland (Schweizer Hitparade)	80
UK Singles (Official Charts)	14
UK Rock & Metal (Official Charts)	1
US Alternative Airplay (Billboard)	32

2017 weekly chart performance for "Papercut"
Chart (2017)	Peak position
Czech Republic Singles Digital (ČNS IFPI)	100
US Hot Rock & Alternative Songs (Billboard)	18

== Certifications ==
Certifications and sales for "Papercut"
Region	Certification	Certified units/sales
Denmark (IFPI Danmark)	Gold	45,000^{‡}
Germany (BVMI)	Gold	300,000^{‡}
Italy (FIMI)	Gold	50,000^{‡}
New Zealand (RMNZ)	2× Platinum	60,000^{‡}
Spain (Promusicae)	Gold	30,000^{‡}
United Kingdom (BPI)	Platinum	607,000
United States (RIAA)	Gold	500,000^{‡}
^{‡} Sales+streaming figures based on certification alone.

== Release history ==
Release dates and formats for "Papercut"
Region	Date	Format(s)	Label(s)	Ref.
United Kingdom	June 18, 2001	CD	Warner Bros.	
United States	January 2002	Alternative radio	Warner Bros.	
