= One Step Closer (Linkin Park song) =

2000 single by Linkin Park

Single by Linkin Park

from the album Hybrid Theory
- B-side: "My December"; "High Voltage"
- Released: August 29, 2000
- Recorded: 2000
- Studio: NRG (Los Angeles)
- Genre: Nu metal; rap metal; rap rock; hard rock
- Length: 2:35
- Label: Warner Bros.
- Songwriters: Chester Bennington; Rob Bourdon; Brad Delson; Joe Hahn; Mike Shinoda
- Producer: Don Gilmore

Linkin Park singles chronology
"One Step Closer" (2000)	"Crawling" (2001)

Music video
- "One Step Closer" on YouTube

"One Step Closer" is a song by American rock band Linkin Park, released as the debut single from their debut album, Hybrid Theory.

A remixed version of the song entitled "1Stp Klosr", featuring Korn frontman Jonathan Davis, was featured on Linkin Park's remix album, Reanimation. In 2021, Linkin Park released a new remix of the song by electronic duo 100 gecs.

The song was mashed up with another song by the band from Hybrid Theory, "Points of Authority", and a collaboration of the song "99 Problems" from The Black Album by Jay-Z on the EP Collision Course.

== Background ==
"One Step Closer" was inspired by the band members', particularly the lead singer Chester Bennington's, frustration with their producer Don Gilmore during the recording sessions for their debut album, Hybrid Theory. Gilmore consistently demanded lyric revisions for the song (which had a working title of "Plaster") and other tracks, pushing the band to perfect the sound and structure for a radio release. This creative tension led to intense frustration, which Bennington channeled directly into the lyrics and vocal performance.

== Live performances ==
In 2001, Linkin Park performed "One Step Closer" on Late Night with Conan O'Brien.

On October 27, 2017, during the Linkin Park and Friends: Celebrate Life in Honor of Chester Bennington, Jonathan Davis performed the song again with the remaining Linkin Park members alongside Ryan Shuck and Amir Derakh of Julien-K and Dead by Sunrise.

== Music video ==
Joe Hahn of Linkin Park and director Gregory Dark came up with the concept for the video.

Directed by Dark and shot in Los Angeles, sixty-three feet underground in the abandoned Hollywood Subway underneath Bunker Hill, the video begins with a group of teenage friends hanging out around a dark alley. Two of them follow a strange man wearing a black hooded robe into a door which leads them to a dark, misty room where the band is playing. Monk-like men are performing martial arts moves throughout the video. Midway through the song, they knock over a crate, startling the monk-like men, and then flee the tunnel. Eventually, the strange man appears at the end of the video. While Bennington screams the song's bridge, he is also upside-down.

In 2018, the staff of Metal Hammer included the video in the site's list of "the 13 best nu metal videos".

== Critical reception ==
Billboard and Kerrang both named "One Step Closer" as the fourth-greatest Linkin Park song.

== Track listing ==
Maxi single (Europe, Australia)
No.	Title	Writer(s)	Length
1.	"One Step Closer"	Linkin Park	2:39
2.	"My December"	Mike Shinoda	4:21
3.	"High Voltage"	Shinoda; Joe Hahn; Brad Delson	3:45
4.	"One Step Closer" (Video)	Linkin Park	2:55

10" vinyl (UK), cassette (UK), cardboard sleeve CD (Europe)
No.	Title	Writer(s)	Length
1.	"One Step Closer"	Linkin Park	2:39
2.	"My December"	Shinoda	4:21

100 gecs remix
No.	Title	Writer(s)	Length
1.	"One Step Closer" (100 gecs Reanimation)	Linkin Park	2:21

Early promo CD
No.	Title	Writer(s)	Length
1.	"Plaster" (David Kahne Mix 1 of 4)	Linkin Park	2:36

US promo
No.	Title	Writer(s)	Length
1.	"One Step Closer" (Album Version)	Linkin Park	2:36
2.	"One Step Closer" (Rock Mix)	Linkin Park	2:36

One-track promo (US, UK)
No.	Title	Writer(s)	Length
1.	"One Step Closer"	Linkin Park	2:39

Humble Brothers Remixes promo CD
No.	Title	Writer(s)	Length
1.	"One Step Closer" (Humble Brothers Remix Extended)	Linkin Park	6:13
2.	"One Step Closer" (Humble Brothers Remix FM Radio)	Linkin Park	3:12
3.	"One Step Closer" (Humble Brothers Remix LP)	Linkin Park	2:35

== Personnel ==
Credits adapted from AllMusic for original release only.

=== Linkin Park ===
- Chester Bennington – vocals
- Mike Shinoda – keyboards, backing vocals, programming, samples, artwork, production
- Brad Delson – guitars
- Joe Hahn – turntables, samples, synthesizers, artwork
- Rob Bourdon – drums

=== Guest musicians ===
- Scott Koziol - bass

=== Production ===
- Don Gilmore – producer, engineering
- Steve Sisco – engineering
- John Ewing Jr. – additional engineering, Pro Tools
- Matt Griffin – engineering assistance
- Andy Wallace – mixing
- Brian Gardner – audio mastering, digital editing
- Jeff Blue – executive producer

=== Artwork ===
- Frank Maddocks – graphic design
- James Minchin III – photography

== Charts ==
=== Weekly charts ===
2000–2001 weekly chart performance for "One Step Closer"
Chart (2000–2001)	Peak position
Australia (ARIA)	4
Austria (Ö3 Austria Top 40)	38
Germany (GfK)	32
Italy (FIMI)	46
Netherlands (Dutch Top 40 Tipparade)	3
Netherlands (Single Top 100)	57
Scottish Singles Sales (Official Charts)	23
Sweden (Sverigetopplistan)	46
Switzerland (Schweizer Hitparade)	42
UK Singles (Official Charts)	24
UK Rock & Metal (Official Charts)	3
US Billboard Hot 100	75
US Alternative Airplay (Billboard)	5
US Mainstream Rock (Billboard)	4

2017 weekly chart performance for "One Step Closer"
Chart (2017)	Peak position
Czech Republic Singles Digital (ČNS IFPI)	75
Portugal (AFP)	77
US Hot Rock & Alternative Songs (Billboard)	14

2024 weekly chart performance for "One Step Closer"
Chart (2024)	Peak position
Global 200 (Billboard)	184

=== Year-end charts ===
Year-end chart performance for "One Step Closer"
Chart (2001)	Position
Australia (ARIA)	42

== Certifications ==
Certifications and sales for "One Step Closer"
Region	Certification	Certified units/sales
Australia (ARIA)	Gold	35,000^{^}
Denmark (IFPI Danmark)	Platinum	90,000^{‡}
Germany (BVMI)	Platinum	600,000^{‡}
Italy (FIMI)	Gold	35,000^{‡}
New Zealand (RMNZ)	3× Platinum	90,000^{‡}
Portugal (AFP)	2× Platinum	20,000^{‡}
Spain (Promusicae)	Gold	30,000^{‡}
United Kingdom (BPI)	Platinum	744,000
United States (RIAA)	Platinum	1,000,000^{‡}
^{^} Shipments figures based on certification alone.^{‡} Sales+streaming figures based on certification alone.

== Release history ==
Release dates and formats for "One Step Closer"
Region	Date	Format	Ref.
United States	August 29, 2000	Rock radio; active rock radio; alternative radio	
United States	September 28, 2000	CD	
United Kingdom	January 13, 2001	CD; 12-inch vinyl	
United States	February 20, 2001	Contemporary hit radio	
