= Crawling (song) =

2001 single by Linkin Park

Single by Linkin Park

from the album Hybrid Theory
- B-side: "Papercut" (Live from the BBC)
- Released: April 2, 2001
- Recorded: 2000
- Studio: NRG (Los Angeles)
- Genre: Nu metal; rap metal; rap rock
- Length: 3:29
- Label: Warner Bros.
- Songwriters: Chester Bennington; Rob Bourdon; Brad Delson; Joe Hahn; Mike Shinoda
- Producer: Don Gilmore

Linkin Park singles chronology
"One Step Closer" (2000)	"Crawling" (2001)	"Papercut" (2001)

Audio sample
- file; help

Music video
- "Crawling" on YouTube

"Crawling" is a song by American rock band Linkin Park. It was released in 2001 as the second single from their debut album, Hybrid Theory (2000). In 2002, it won a Grammy Award for Best Hard Rock Performance.

The song's lyrics, inspired by lead singer Chester Bennington's struggles with substance abuse, focus on themes of self-control and inner conflict. The accompanying music video, directed by the Brothers Strause, portrays a young woman's struggle with an abusive relationship and was nominated for an MTV Video Music Award. "Crawling" was a commercial success internationally, reaching the top ten in several countries, including Canada and Austria, and remains one of the band's most recognizable tracks.

== Background ==
"Crawling" is one of the few songs on Hybrid Theory to not prominently feature Mike Shinoda's rapped lyrics. The intro to "Crawling" has been remixed in live versions over the years. Since 2008's Projekt Revolution, Mike Shinoda has rapped the first verse of "Hands Held High" over the intro to Reanimation version of "Crawling", titled "Krwlng" (featuring Staind frontman Aaron Lewis). In 2009, Shinoda rapped two verses of "Hands Held High" over the intro of "Crawling", whose first verse started with an a cappella or a bassline before the Reanimation intro started, in which Shinoda raps the second verse. Singer Chester Bennington remarked that "Crawling" was the most difficult Linkin Park song to sing live, stating "Crawling has caused me the most trouble live more than any other song." Bennington also commented on the meaning of "Crawling" by stating it was inspired by his own battles with substance abuse. "Crawling is about feeling like I had no control over myself in terms of drugs and alcohol, hence the line "These wounds they will not heal...". The song is recorded in the key of C♯ minor.

A live version of "Crawling" was included as a B-side to "Breaking the Habit".

== Music video ==
The video was directed by the Brothers Strause. It portrays a young woman's inner conflict dealing with an abusive relationship. The woman (portrayed by Katelyn Rosaasen) closes off to the rest of the world, represented with the special effects of crystals forming around her. By the end, the crystals recede.

The original synopsis for the video featured a different conclusion inspired by the film Species, involving a fan attacking the band. However, this concept was rejected by Warner Bros., leading to the implementation of the current ending.

"Crawling" was the first music video with Dave "Phoenix" Farrell in the band, as he had returned just before the video was filmed. Mike Shinoda is depicted playing rhythm guitar, although Brad Delson plays all guitars and bass on the record.

The video was nominated for Best Rock video on MTV's Video Music Awards. It lost to Limp Bizkit's "Rollin".

=== Bonus content ===
The bonus feature on the CD is the same footage that is a hidden easter egg on Frat Party at the Pankake Festival. However, the footage here is uncensored, while the footage on "Frat Party" is censored.

A "Strictly Limited Numbered Edition" DVD single was also released which includes a live version of "Crawling" that was performed at the Dragon Festival, though the audio is dubbed with the studio version of the song. The video has a multiple camera angle feature which allows viewers to see different camera angles of the performance with the use of the DVD remote control. The DVD also has four 30-second live snippets of "One Step Closer", "By Myself", "With You", and "A Place for My Head". The live video of "Crawling" is available on Warner Bros. Records YouTube channel, which was uploaded on February 9, 2010. The video is also available as a DVD extra to "Frat Party at the Pankake Festival".

== Notable cover versions ==
Coldplay frontman Chris Martin performed a solo piano rendition of "Crawling" live in early August 2017. The performance was a tribute to Chester Bennington, who died by suicide on July 20, 2017.

Staind frontman Aaron Lewis performed a tribute version of "Crawling" live on stage on August 10, 2017, at Look Park in Florence, Massachusetts.

Jared Leto of 30 Seconds to Mars included "Crawling" in a mashup tribute to Bennington.

== In other media ==
At the Vancouver 2010 Winter Olympics, John and Sinead Kerr representing Great Britain performed the Reanimation version of "Krwling" in the figure skating ice dance final.

== Commercial performance ==
"Crawling" achieved significant commercial success internationally. In the United Kingdom, the single peaked at number 16 on the UK Singles Chart and remained on the chart for eight weeks. The song also reached the top ten in Austria and Canada.. It reached the top thirty and top forty in many countries, where it was more successful than "One Step Closer". However, it peaked only at number 79 in the United States, becoming their lowest charting single until they released "Given Up", which peaked at number 99, although it managed to peak at number five on the Modern Rock Track Chart and number three on the Mainstream Rock Track Chart. Despite the low peak, the song remained for 20 weeks at the bottom of the chart, which is longer than the 18 weeks spent by "One Step Closer".

== Track listing ==
All tracks are written by Linkin Park.

CD single
No.	Title	Length
1.	"Crawling" (Album Version)	3:29
2.	"Papercut" (Live from the BBC)	3:08
3.	"Backstage Video Footage" (Video)	9:56

DVD single
No.	Title	Length
1.	"Crawling" (Live Video)	3:31
2.	"Crawling" (Album Version)	3:29
3.	"4x30 Second Live Video Snippets"	2:00

== Personnel ==
Credits adapted from AllMusic for original release only.

Linkin Park

- Chester Bennington – vocals
- Mike Shinoda – rap vocals, keyboards, programming, samples, artwork and production
- Brad Delson – guitars, bass guitar
- Joe Hahn – turntables, samples, synthesizers, artwork
- Rob Bourdon – drums, percussion

Production

- Don Gilmore – producer, engineering
- Steve Sisco – Engineering
- John Ewing Jr. – Additional engineering, Pro Tools
- Matt Griffin – Engineering assistance
- Andy Wallace – mixing
- Brian Gardner – Audio mastering, digital editing
- Jeff Blue – executive producer

Artwork

- Frank Maddocks – graphic design
- James Minchin III – photography

== Charts ==
=== Weekly charts ===
Weekly chart performance for "Crawling"
Chart (2001–2002)	Peak position
Australia (ARIA)	33
Austria (Ö3 Austria Top 40)	8
Belgium (Ultratop 50 Flanders)	25
Europe (Eurochart Hot 100)	52
Germany (GfK)	14
Ireland (IRMA)	16
Netherlands (Dutch Top 40 Tipparade)	5
Netherlands (Single Top 100)	45
New Zealand (Recorded Music NZ)	37
Scotland Singles (Official Charts)	15
Sweden (Sverigetopplistan)	27
Switzerland (Schweizer Hitparade)	43
UK Singles (Official Charts)	16
UK Rock & Metal (Official Charts)	2
US Billboard Hot 100	79
US Alternative Airplay (Billboard)	5
US Mainstream Rock (Billboard)	3

2017 weekly chart performance for "Crawling"
Chart (2017)	Peak position
Canada Digital Songs (Billboard)	41
Czech Republic Singles Digital (ČNS IFPI)	73
France (SNEP)	106
Hungary (Single Top 40)	30
Portugal (AFP)	81
Slovakia Singles Digital (ČNS IFPI)	74
US Hot Rock & Alternative Songs (Billboard)	8

=== Year-end charts ===
2001 year-end chart performance for "Crawling"
Chart (2001)	Position
Austria (Ö3 Austria Top 40)	31
Belgium (Ultratop 50 Flanders)	97
Germany (Media Control)	47
Ireland (IRMA)	88
UK Singles (OCC)	190
US Mainstream Rock Tracks (Billboard)	6
US Modern Rock Tracks (Billboard)	5

2017 year-end chart performance for "Crawling"
Chart (2017)	Position
US Hot Rock Songs (Billboard)	85

== Certifications ==
Certifications for "Crawling"
Region	Certification	Certified units/sales
Austria (IFPI Austria) Video	Gold	5,000^{*}
Denmark (IFPI Danmark)	Gold	45,000^{‡}
Germany (BVMI)	Platinum	600,000^{‡}
Italy (FIMI)	Platinum	100,000^{‡}
New Zealand (RMNZ)	2× Platinum	60,000^{‡}
Spain (Promusicae)	Gold	30,000^{‡}
United Kingdom (BPI)	Platinum	753,000
United States (RIAA)	Gold	500,000^{‡}
^{*} Sales figures based on certification alone.^{‡} Sales+streaming figures based on certification alone.

== Release history ==
Release history and formats for "Crawling"
Region	Date	Format	Label	Ref.
United States	April 2, 2001	CD	Warner Bros.	
United Kingdom	April 9, 2001	CD; DVD; cassette	Warner Bros.	
United States	April 17, 2001	Mainstream rock radio; active rock radio; alternative radio	Warner Bros.	
Australia	April 23, 2001	CD	Warner Bros.	
Japan	May 9, 2001	DVD	Warner Bros.	
