= Jeff Blue =

American musical artist (born 1967)

Jeffrey Blue
- Born: November 21, 1967 (age 58)
- Origin: Los Angeles
- Genres: Alternative rock; alternative metal; pop rock; R&B; Hip hop
- Occupations: Record producer; A&R executive; songwriter; lawyer; author; music supervisor
- Instruments: Drums; piano
- Labels: Zomba; Warner Bros.; Interscope; RCA; J; Virgin; Atlantic
- Website: jeffbluemedia.com centuryparkmedia.com

Jeffrey Blue (born November 21, 1967) is an A&R executive, record producer, and songwriter who is currently a music consultant for several major record labels and music supervisors. He has worked as the Senior Vice President of A&R and staff producer for Warner Bros. Records, Interscope Records, Virgin Records, Capitol Records, Sony BMG, Jive Records, RCA Records, and J Records. He specializes in discovering, developing, and signing unsigned artists. Blue most notably discovered Linkin Park, Macy Gray, Daniel Powter, and The Last Goodnight. In addition to signing Limp Bizkit and Korn to publishing deals, he has also written singles for artists such as Hoobastank, Macy Gray, Syndicate, and The Last Goodnight.

== Biography ==
Blue attended the University of California, Los Angeles (UCLA), where he studied Communications focusing on Media Law. Blue played drums while in college. He interned for TMZ host Harvey Levin who was the legal reporter at the local CBS TV News Department and convinced Blue to go to law school. Blue then attended Loyola Law School in Los Angeles to pursue a career as an attorney. Blue passed the bar exam and found work as a lawyer, but lost passion for the profession. Blue became a music journalist for Billboard, HITS, and Entertainment Weekly, and eventually published his own magazine, Crossroads, which focused on discovering unsigned artists. He also pursued a career in acting and appeared in television commercials.

Blue joined Zomba Music Publishing in 1995 and became the label's vice president of A&R while also teaching classes at UCLA. He met Brad Delson at UCLA, then a student, who became his intern. Blue mentored Delson and took interest in his band, Xero, which he had just cofounded with Mike Shinoda. Blue signed a publishing development deal with Xero and played a pivotal role in Linkin Park's early history by helping the band find vocalist Chester Bennington. After Blue left Zomba and joined Warner Records, he signed Linkin Park to their first record deal and executive produced the band's debut album Hybrid Theory.

Blue also developed and co-wrote with Macy Gray. After recording Gray's demos, Blue secured a deal for the artist with Epic Records and led to him co-writing "Still" for Gray. He also signed rock bands Korn and Limp Bizkit to publishing deals.

Beyond A&R, he has directly collaborated with artists to write and produce music. Blue wrote Hoobastank's "So Close, So Far". He was also the executive producer and co-writer for Queen of the Damned's soundtrack. In 2007, Blue collaborated with The Last Goodnight to co-write the song Pictures of You, which won a BMI Pop Award. He also performed all the drums and percussion on the band's debut album, Poison Kiss. In 2008, he developed, co-wrote, and co-produced the debut album for Steadlür.

In 2012, Blue signed, co-wrote, and developed WERM after discovering the band on Music Xray. In 2020, Blue released, One Step Closer, From Xero to #1; Becoming Linkin Park, a book detailing his early work with Linkin Park. He also worked on a docu-series covering the history of A&R through and in conjunction with Mark Wahlberg's production company Unrealistic Ideas.

Currently, Blue is the founder of entertainment media production company, Century Park Entertainment.
