= One More Light Live =

Live album by Linkin Park
- Released: December 15, 2017
- Recorded: 2017; One More Light World Tour
- Length: 67:50
- Labels: Warner Bros.; Machine Shop
- Producers: Joe Hahn, Mike Shinoda

Linkin Park chronology
One More Light (2017)	One More Light Live (2017)	Hybrid Theory 20th Anniversary Edition (2020)

Singles from One More Light Live
- 1. "Crawling" Released: December 4, 2017; 2. "Sharp Edges" Released: December 14, 2017

Professional ratings
Review scores
Source	Rating
AllMusic	4/5 stars

One More Light Live is the third live album by American rock band Linkin Park, released on December 15, 2017. Recorded during the band's European leg of their One More Light World Tour in 2017, this is the first release since the death of lead singer Chester Bennington as well as the final live album to feature drummer / band co-founder Rob Bourdon and lead guitarist Brad Delson. Bourdon departed the band in 2020 and opted not to rejoin for the group's reformation in 2024; Delson later announced his decision to withdraw from touring with the band during its reunion, but still remains as an official member of the band.

== Background ==
Linkin Park began their album tour in Buenos Aires, Argentina on May 6, 2017, at the Maximus Festival. They continued on with playing three more shows on the South American run before returning to the United States to play a few promo shows, including a performance on Jimmy Kimmel Live!.

The band set off for a one-month trip to Europe to play a total of 16 shows. The European Tour began in Bretigny, France on June 9, 2017. The tour took the band to numerous festivals including Download Paris, Hellfest, Impact, Southside and more. Linkin Park played back-to-back shows in London before the tour came to an end in Birmingham, England where Bennington's final performance with Linkin Park took place.

The band was scheduled to play in Manchester the following day but cancelled their performance due to the venue still being damaged from the May 2017 terrorist attack that occurred during Ariana Grande's concert.

On July 20, 2017, Bennington died by suicide in his Palos Verdes Estates home. In the wake of his death, Linkin Park cancelled the rest of the One More Light tour, which was set to begin a week after Bennington's death.

== Track listing ==
No.	Title	Writer(s)	Length
1.	"Roads Untraveled (with "Fallout") / Talking to Myself"	Chester Bennington; Rob Bourdon; Brad Delson; Dave Farrell; Joe Hahn; Ilsey Juber; Mike Shinoda; JR Rotem	5:16
2.	"Burn It Down"	Bennington; Bourdon; Delson; Farrell; Hahn; Shinoda	4:13
3.	"Battle Symphony"	Delson; Jon Green; Shinoda	3:45
4.	"New Divide"	Bennington; Bourdon; Delson; Farrell; Hahn; Shinoda	4:30
5.	"Invisible"	Justin Parker; Shinoda	4:30
6.	"Nobody Can Save Me"	Delson; Green; Shinoda	3:59
7.	"One More Light"	Shinoda; Francis White	4:19
8.	"Crawling" (Acoustic version)	Bennington; Bourdon; Delson; Hahn; Shinoda	3:29
9.	"Leave Out All the Rest"	Bennington; Bourdon; Delson; Farrell; Hahn; Shinoda	4:50
10.	"Good Goodbye" (feat. Stormzy)	Delson; Michael Omari; Jesse Shatkin; Shinoda; Terrence Thornton	4:08
11.	"What I've Done"	Bennington; Bourdon; Delson; Farrell; Hahn; Shinoda	4:33
12.	"In the End"	Bennington; Bourdon; Delson; Hahn; Shinoda	3:48
13.	"Sharp Edges" (Acoustic version)	Delson; Juber; Shinoda	4:47
14.	"Numb" (with excerpts from "Numb/Encore")	Bennington; Bourdon; Shawn Carter; Delson; Farrell; Hahn; Shinoda; Kanye West	3:50
15.	"Heavy"	Bennington; Delson; Julia Michaels; Shinoda; Justin Tranter	2:58
16.	"Bleed It Out"	Bennington; Bourdon; Delson; Farrell; Hahn; Shinoda	4:57
Total length:			67:50

== Personnel ==
Linkin Park

- Chester Bennington – vocals, guitar (3, 6, 13)
- Rob Bourdon – drums (1–6, 9–12, 14–16)
- Brad Delson – guitars (1–7, 9–16); synthesizer (2)
- Dave "Phoenix" Farrell – bass guitar, backing vocals; sampler (10), guitar (9)
- Joe Hahn – turntables, samplers, and backing vocals (1-7, 9-12, 14-16)
- Mike Shinoda – vocals, keyboards (1–4, 6–9, 11, 14–15), guitar (10–12, 16)

Additional musicians

- Stormzy – guest vocals (10)

Production

- Mike Shinoda - mixing, production
- Joe Hahn - mixing, co-production

== Charts ==
=== Weekly charts ===
Weekly chart performance for One More Light Live
Chart (2017–18)	Peak position
Australian Albums (ARIA)	20
Austrian Albums (Ö3 Austria)	11
Belgian Albums (Ultratop Flanders)	25
Belgian Albums (Ultratop Wallonia)	45
Canadian Albums (Billboard)	29
Croatian International Albums (HDU)	33
French Albums (SNEP)	54
Dutch Albums (Album Top 100)	10
German Albums (Offizielle Top 100)	7
Hungarian Albums (MAHASZ)	6
New Zealand Albums (RMNZ)	32
Polish Albums (ZPAV)	28
Portuguese Albums (AFP)	15
Scottish Albums (Official Charts)	38
Swiss Albums (Schweizer Hitparade)	7
UK Albums (Official Charts)	32
UK Rock & Metal Albums (Official Charts)	1
US Top Alternative Albums (Billboard)	2
US Billboard 200	28
US Top Hard Rock Albums (Billboard)	2
US Top Rock Albums (Billboard)	3

=== Year-end charts ===
Year-end chart performance for One More Light Live
Chart (2017)	Position
Hungarian Albums (MAHASZ)	82
Chart (2018)	Position
Belgian Albums (Ultratop Flanders)	195
Hungarian Albums (MAHASZ)	95
Portuguese Albums (AFP)	86
Swiss Albums (Schweizer Hitparade)	76
