= Mike Shinoda production discography =

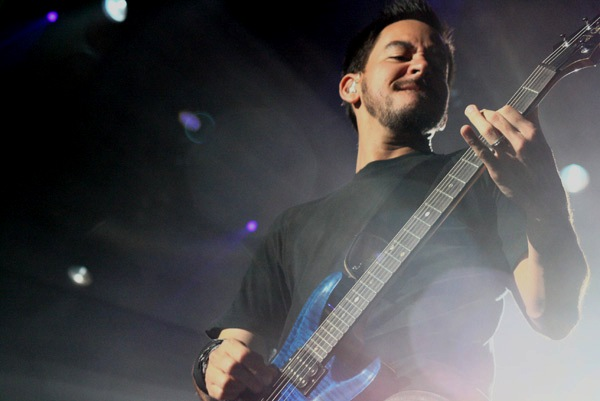
Shinoda performing in 2008

The following list is a discography of productions by Mike Shinoda, an American hip hop record producer, recording artist, and the principal songwriter, keyboardist, rhythm guitarist and co-vocalist of the rock band Linkin Park from Agoura Hills, Los Angeles. It includes a list of songs produced, co-produced and remixed by year, artist, album and title.

== Singles and other songs featured and produced ==
=== As vocal ===
List of singles as featured artist, with selected chart positions, showing year released and album name
Title	Year	Peak chart positions										Album
Title	Year	US	AUS	AUT	GER	IRL	NOR	NZ	SWE	SWI	UK	Album
"It's Goin' Down" (The X-Ecutioners featuring Mike Shinoda and Mr. Hahn)	2002	85	28	—	56	—	—	—	—	69	7	Built from Scratch
"Second to None" (Styles of Beyond featuring Mike Shinoda)	2012	—	—	—	—	—	—	—	—	—	—	Reseda Beach
"—" denotes a recording that did not chart or was not released in that territory.

=== As programmer ===
List of singles as featured artist, with selected chart positions, showing year released and album name
Title	Year	Peak chart positions										Album
Title	Year	US	AUS	AUT	GER	IRL	NOR	NZ	SWE	SWI	UK	Album
"Enjoy the Silence (Reinterpreted)" (Mike Shinoda Remix)	2004	—	—	48	5	40	—	—	31	44	7	Remixes 81–04
"—" denotes a recording that did not chart or was not released in that territory.

=== Producer ===
List of singles and other songs as either producer or co-producer, showing year released, performing artists, album name and label
Year	Artist	Song	Album
2002	Linkin Park	"Pts.OF.Athrty"	Reanimation
2004	Jay-Z & Linkin Park	"Numb/Encore"	Collision Course
2004	Handsome Boy Modeling School	"Rock and Roll (Could Never Hip Hop Like This) Part 2 / Knockers"	White People
2005	Fort Minor	"Petrified/Remember the Name"	The Rising Tied
2005	Fort Minor	"Believe Me"	The Rising Tied
2006	Fort Minor	"Where'd You Go"	The Rising Tied
2006	Fort Minor	"S.C.O.M."	Fort Minor: We Major
2006	Fort Minor	"Dolla"	Fort Minor: We Major
2006	Fort Minor	"Get It"	Fort Minor: We Major
2006	Fort Minor	"Spraypaint & Inkpens"	Fort Minor: We Major
2006	DJ Vlad & Roc Raida	"Mike Shinoda Interlude"	Rock Phenomenon
2006	Lupe Fiasco	"The Instrumental"	Lupe Fiasco's Food & Liquor
2007	Styles of Beyond	"Hard [MS Remix]"	Razor Tag
2007	Styles of Beyond	"Hey You"	Razor Tag
2007	Styles of Beyond	"You Cannot Fuck With This"	Razor Tag
2007	Linkin Park	"What I've Done"	Minutes to Midnight
2007	Linkin Park	"Bleed It Out"	Minutes to Midnight
2007	Linkin Park	"Shadow of the Day"	Minutes to Midnight
2008	Linkin Park	"Given Up"	Minutes to Midnight
2008	Busta Rhymes featuring Linkin Park	"We Made It"	Non album single
2008	Linkin Park	"Leave Out All the Rest"	Minutes to Midnight
2008	White Pegacorn	"Barack Your World"	Non album single
2009	Julien-K	"Death to Analog (Mike Shinoda Remix)"	Death to Digital; Death to Digital X
2009	Apathy	"Shoot First"	Wanna Snuggle?
2009	Zii	"Stories of the Lost"	Non album single
2009	Linkin Park	"New Divide"	Transformers: Revenge of the Fallen – The Album
2010	Cypress Hill	"Carry Me Away"	Rise Up
2010	Linkin Park	"The Catalyst"	A Thousand Suns
2010	Linkin Park	"Waiting for the End"	A Thousand Suns
2011	Linkin Park	"Burning in the Skies"	A Thousand Suns
2011	Linkin Park	"Iridescent"	A Thousand Suns
2011	Linkin Park	"Not Alone"	Download to Donate for Haiti
2012	Chino Moreno	"RAZORS.OUT"	The Raid: Redemption
2012	Get Busy Committee	"SUICIDE MUSIC"	The Raid: Redemption
2012	Ramin Djawadi	"NOC Out"	Medal of Honor: Warfighter
2012	Ramin Djawadi	"Saa'iq"	Medal of Honor: Warfighter
2012	Styles of Beyond	"Dumb It Down"	Reseda Beach
2012	Styles of Beyond	"Second to None" (also from the 2007 soundtrack, Transformers - The Album)	Reseda Beach
2012	Linkin Park	"Burn It Down"	Living Things
2012	Linkin Park	"Lost in the Echo"	Living Things
2012	Linkin Park	"Powerless"	Living Things
2013	Linkin Park	"Castle of Glass"	Living Things
2013	Linkin Park x Steve Aoki	"A Light That Never Comes"	Recharged
2014	Linkin Park featuring Rakim	"Guilty All the Same"	The Hunting Party
2014	Linkin Park	"Until It's Gone"	The Hunting Party
2014	Linkin Park	"Wastelands"	The Hunting Party
2014	Linkin Park featuring Daron Malakian	"Rebellion"	The Hunting Party
2014	Linkin Park	"Final Masquerade"	The Hunting Party
2015	Fort Minor	"Welcome"	Non album single
2016	Hot Karl	"Like Riding A Bike"	Non album single
2017	Linkin Park featuring Kiiara	"Heavy"	One More Light
2017	Linkin Park	"Battle Symphony"	One More Light
2017	One Ok Rock	"One Way Ticket"	Ambitions
2017	Linkin Park featuring Pusha T and Stormzy	"Good Goodbye"	One More Light
2017	Linkin Park	"Invisible"	One More Light
2017	Linkin Park	"Talking to Myself"	One More Light
2021	Alex McMillan	"Bones"	Non album single
2021	Judison	"I Can't Feel A Thing"	Non album single
2021	Daniel Sherman	"What You Want"	Non album single
2021	Chris Kelly	"Bittersweet"	Non album single
2021	Megan Lenius	"Not Your Game"	Non album single
2021	Ben Kessler	"Known Like This - Mike Shinoda Shinoda Mix"	Non album single
2021	Kinstsuku	"Enough"	Non album single
2021	Wax//Wane	"The Way Down"	Non album single
2021	Bella Goldwin	"Just A Dream"	Non album single
2021	JordinLaine	"These Dreams"	Non album single
2021	Joe Turone	"Strong"	Non album single
2021	PLEXXAGLASS	"Lilith"	Non album single
2021	Dusty the Stampede	"Space Boots"	Non album single
2021	Noah Khorey	"Nowhere Else"	Non album single
2021	Hadi	"Clarity"	Non album single
2021	Matthew K. Heafy	"In Defiance"	Non album single
2021	Amber Lee	"Crazy"	Non album single
2021	every rose	"Objects in View"	Non album single
2021	Pealeaf	"What Is Yours"	Non album single
2023	Demi Lovato	"Still Alive"	Non album single
2023	Pvris	"Take My Nirvana"	Evergreen

== Studio albums produced ==
List of studio albums as either producer or co-producer, showing year released and performing artists
Year	Artist	Album	Label
2002	The X-Ecutioners	Built from Scratch	Loud Records, Sony BMG
2005	Fort Minor	The Rising Tied	Machine Shop, Warner Bros.
2006	Lupe Fiasco	Lupe Fiasco's Food & Liquor	1st & 15th, Atlantic
2006	Celph Titled	The Gatalog: A Collection of Chaos	Endless Recording Company/Demigodz Records
2007	Linkin Park	Minutes to Midnight	Warner Bros., Machine Shop
2009	Apathy	Wanna Snuggle?	Demigodz Records
2010	Cypress Hill	Rise Up	Priority
2010	Linkin Park	A Thousand Suns	Warner Bros., Machine Shop
2012	Linkin Park	Living Things	Warner Bros., Machine Shop
2012	Styles of Beyond	Reseda Beach	Dirty Version Records
2014	Linkin Park	The Hunting Party	Warner Bros., Machine Shop
2017	One OK Rock	Ambitions	Fueled by Ramen
2017	Linkin Park	One More Light	Warner Bros., Machine Shop
2018	Himself	Post Traumatic	Warner Bros., Machine Shop
2020	Himself	Dropped Frames, Vol. 1	Kenji Kobayashi Productions
2020	Himself	Dropped Frames, Vol.2	Kenji Kobayashi Productions
2020	Himself	Dropped Frames, Vol.3	Kenji Kobayashi Productions
2023	Pvris	Evergreen	Hopeless Records

== Remix albums produced ==
List of remix albums as either producer or co-producer, showing year released and performing artists
Year	Artist	Album	Label
2002	Linkin Park	Reanimation	Warner Bros.
2006	DJ Vlad & Roc Raida	Rock Phenomenon	Altered Ego
2009	Julien-K	Death to Digital; Death to Digital X	Metropolis Records
2013	Linkin Park	Recharged	Warner Bros., Machine Shop

== Mixtapes produced ==
List of mixtapes as either producer or co-producer, showing year released and performing artists
Year	Artist	Album	Label
1997	Xero	Xero Sampler Tape	Self-released
1999	Hybrid Theory	Hybrid Theory (8-track CD)	Mixed Media
2005	Fort Minor	Fort Minor: We Major	Machine Shop
2005	Fort Minor	Fort Minor: Sampler Mixtape	Machine Shop
2007	Styles of Beyond	Razor Tag	Machine Shop
2010	Various Artists	How to Make it in America: The Mixtape	HBO

== Live albums produced ==
List of Live Albums as either producer or co-producer, showing year released and performing artists
Year	Artist	Album	Label
2006	Fort Minor	Sessions@AOL	Machine Shop
2011	Linkin Park	A Thousand Suns+	Warner Bros., Machine Shop
2013	Linkin Park	Living Things +	Warner Bros., Machine Shop
2014	Linkin Park	The Hunting Party: Live in Mexico	Warner Bros., Machine Shop
2017	Linkin Park	One More Light Live	Warner Bros., Machine Shop

== Soundtracks and score produced ==
List of Soundtracks/Score as either producer or co-producer, showing year released and performing artists
Year	Artist	Album	Label
2003	Various Artists	The Matrix Reloaded: The Album (Credited as Linkin Park)	Warner Bros.
2005/2010	Mike Shinoda & Lil Jon	MTV VMA Score 2005	MTV
2007	Various Artists (Linkin Park - Primary Artist)	Transformers: The Album	Reprise Records
2008	Various Artists	Twilight	Chop Shop Records/Atlantic Records
2009	Various Artists (Linkin Park - Primary Artist)	Transformers: Revenge of the Fallen – The Album	Reprise Records
2009	Steve Jablonsky	Transformers: Revenge of the Fallen – The Score	Reprise Records
2011	Various Artists (Linkin Park - Primary Artist)	Transformers: Dark of the Moon – The Album	Reprise
2012	Mike Shinoda & Joseph Trapanese	The Raid: Redemption	Madison Gate
2012	Mike Shinoda & Ramin Djawadi	Medal of Honor: Warfighter	E.A.R.S.
2014	Various Artists	Pro Evolution Soccer 2015	PES Productions
2014	Linkin Park & Alec Puro	Mall	Warner Bros., Machine Shop

== Compilation albums produced ==
List of compilations as either producer or co-producer, showing year released and performing artists
Year	Artist	Album	Label
2007	Apathy	Hell's Lost and Found	Demigodz
2010	Various Artists	Download to Donate for Haiti	Warner Bros., Machine Shop
2010	Linkin Park	A Decade Underground	Machine Shop
2011	Various Artists	Download to Donate for Haiti V2.0	Warner Bros., Machine Shop
2011	Various Artists	Download to Donate: Tsunami Relief	Warner Bros., Machine Shop
2012	Apathy	It's The Bootleg, Muthafuckas! Volume 3: Fire Walk With Me	Demigodz
2012	Various Artists	NOW: The Hits of Spring 2012	Warner Music

== Extended plays produced ==
List of Extended plays as either producer or co-producer, showing year released and performing artists
Year	Artist	Album	Label
1999	Hybrid Theory	Hybrid Theory	Mix Media
2002	Linkin Park	In the End (Live and Rare)	Warner Bros.
2002	Linkin Park	LP Underground 2.0	Machine Shop
2003	Linkin Park	LP Underground 3.0	Machine Shop
2004	Jay-Z & Linkin Park	Collision Course	Roc-A-Fella, Machine Shop, Warner Bros., Def Jam
2004	Linkin Park	LP Underground 4.0	Machine Shop
2005	Linkin Park	LP Underground 5.0	Machine Shop
2006	Linkin Park	LP Underground 6.0	Machine Shop
2006	Fort Minor	Sessions@AOL	Machine Shop
2006	Fort Minor	Militia	Machine Shop
2007	Linkin Park	LP Underground 7.0	Machine Shop
2007	Styles of Beyond	Razor Tag: Key Cuts EP	Machine Shop
2008	Mmm... Cookies	LP Underground 8.0	Warner Bros.
2008	Linkin Park	Songs from the Underground	Warner Bros.
2014	Linkin Park x Steve Aoki	A Light That Never Comes (Remixes)	Warner Bros., Dim Mak
2018	Himself	Post Traumatic EP	Warner Bros., Machine Shop

== Demo albums produced ==
List of Demo albums as either producer or co-producer, showing year released and performing artists
Year	Artist	Album	Label
2009	Linkin Park	LP Underground 9.0	Machine Shop
2010	Linkin Park	Underground X: Demos	Machine Shop
2010	Linkin Park	A Decade Underground	Machine Shop
2011	Linkin Park	LP Underground 11.0	Machine Shop
2012	Linkin Park	LP Underground 12.0	Machine Shop
2013	Linkin Park	LP Underground XIII	Machine Shop
2014	Linkin Park	LP Underground XIV	Machine Shop

== Remixes ==
Year	Track	Artist	Album	Notes
2002	"Pushing Me Away"	Linkin Park	Reanimation	Titled "P5hng Me A*wy" (Mike Shinoda featuring Stephen Richards)
2002	"By Myself"	Linkin Park	Reanimation	Titled "By_Myslf" (Josh Abraham & Mike Shinoda)
2002	"Crawling"	Linkin Park	Reanimation	Titled "KRWLNG" (Mike Shinoda featuring Aaron Lewis)
2004	"Enjoy the Silence"	Depeche Mode	Remixes 81–04	Titled "Enjoy the Silence" (Reinterpreted)
2005	"Petrified"	Fort Minor	The Rising Tied	Titled "Petrified" (Los Angeles Remix)
2006	"Believe Me" (featuring Bobo & Styles of Beyond)	Fort Minor	Militia	Titled "Believe Me" (Club Remix)
2007	"What I've Done"	Linkin Park	Minutes to Midnight	Titled "What I've Done" (Distorted Remix)
2007	"Hard"	Styles of Beyond	Razor Tag	
2008	"Leave Out All the Rest"	Linkin Park	—N/a	Titled "L.O.A.T.R." (M. Shinoda Remix)
2008	"Magic Doors"	Portishead		(Styles Of Beyond Remix)
2009	"Death to Analog"	Julien-K	Death to Digital	
2010	"Gold Guns Girls"	Metric	Download to Donate for Haiti	
2011	"Wednesday Was a Good Day"	Jawbone	—N/a	
2013	"Castle of Glass"	Linkin Park	Recharged	
2013	"Victimized"	Linkin Park	Recharged	
2016	"Get a Dog"	Aesop Rock & Homeboy Sandman	—N/a	Titled "Get a Dog" (Fort Minor Remix)
2019	"Grand Paradise"	Foxing	—N/a	
2020	"I Drive Me Mad"	Renforshort	—N/a	
2020	"Passenger"	Deftones	Black Stallion	

== Other works ==
Year	Track	Artist	Album	Notes
1998	"Marco Polo"	Styles of Beyond	2000 Fold	Producer
1999	-	DJ Frane	Frane's Fantastic Boatride	Artwork
1999	-	Saukrates	The Underground Tapes	Artwork
2002	"Freestyle"	DJ Vice	I'm Serious	Vocals
2004	"Mike Callin' to Say Hi" (skit)	KutMasta Kurt	Redneck Olympics	Vocals
2004	"Rock and Roll (Could Never Hip Hop Like This) (Part 2)"	Handsome Boy Modeling School	White People	Vocals, guitars, piano, bass, producer
2006	"Mike Shinoda Interlude"	DJ Vlad & Roc Raida	Rock Phenomenon	Vocals
2007	"Hey You"	Styles of Beyond	Razor Tag	Vocals
2008	"We Made It"	Busta Rhymes & Linkin Park	We Made It (single)	Vocals, guitars, producer
2009	"Stories of the Lost"	Zii	Stories of the Lost (single)	Executive producer
2010	"Carry Me Away"	Cypress Hill	Rise Up	Vocals, producer
2012	Full album	Mike Shinoda & Joseph Trapanese	The Raid: Redemption	Composer
2012	"NOC Out"	Ramin Djawadi	Medal of Honor: Warfighter	Composer
2012	"Saa'iq"	Ramin Djawadi	Medal of Honor: Warfighter	Composer
2013	"Change" (LPU Sessions 2013)	Beta State	LP Underground XIII	Producer, keyboard, samples
