= Linkin Park and Friends: Celebrate Life in Honor of Chester Bennington =

2017 tribute concert

- Livestream concert by Linkin Park and others
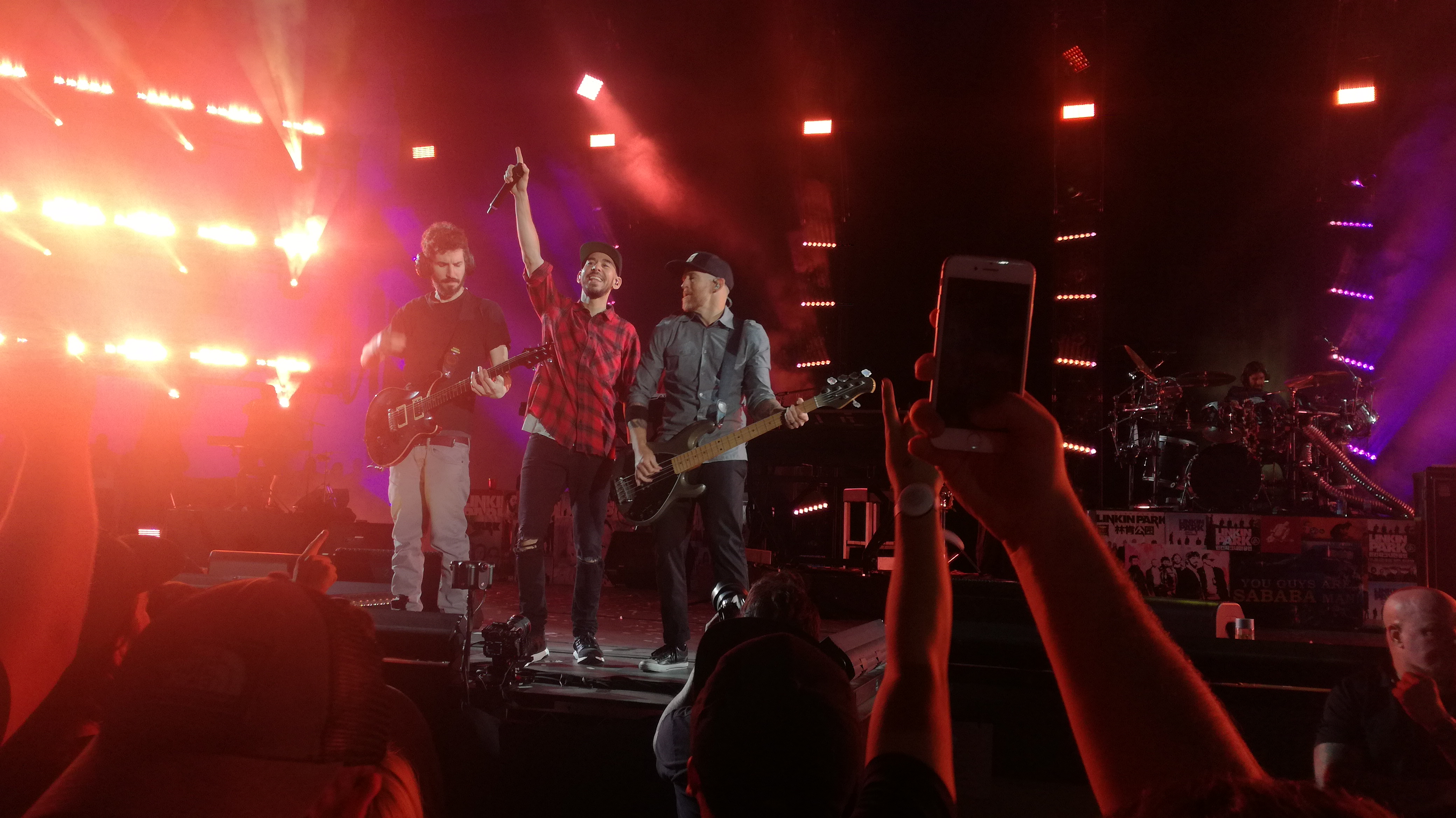
- (L–R): Brad Delson, Mike Shinoda and Dave Farrell performing at the tribute concert
- Venue: Hollywood Bowl
- Date: October 27, 2017
- Website: linkinpark.com
Linkin Park concert chronology
- One More Light World Tour
- (2017)
- Linkin Park and Friends: Celebrate Life in Honor of Chester Bennington
- (2017)
- From Zero World Tour
- (2024–2026)

Linkin Park and Friends: Celebrate Life in Honor of Chester Bennington was a tribute concert by the American rock band Linkin Park, held on October 27, 2017, at the Hollywood Bowl in order to honor their frontman Chester Bennington who died by suicide on July 20, 2017. It was Linkin Park's only live performance following Bennington's death until the band's reformation in 2024, and also their final concert to include drummer and band co-founder Rob Bourdon, who did not rejoin the band following its hiatus. The concert featured various artists, including Blink-182 and members of System of a Down, Korn, Avenged Sevenfold, Machine Gun Kelly, Sum 41, Bring Me the Horizon, Civil Twilight, A Day to Remember, Yellowcard, and Kiiara.

== Background ==
After the first leg of Linkin Park's One More Light World Tour, promoting their seventh studio album, One More Light, vocalist Chester Bennington was found dead from suicide by hanging on July 20, 2017, resulting in the cancellation of the rest of the tour.

On August 22, Linkin Park announced plans to host a tribute concert in Los Angeles to honor Bennington. Later, the band confirmed that the concert would take place on October 27 at the Hollywood Bowl, and would feature a number of bands and musicians. On September 23, the band announced that the concert had officially sold out.

On October 20, it was announced Linkin Park would livestream the concert on their YouTube channel. As of July 2025, the concert has been viewed more than 26 million times.

== Performers ==
=== Linkin Park ===
- Mike Shinoda – lead and backing vocals, rapping, rhythm guitar, keyboards, piano, synthesizers, samplers, bass on "Shadow of the Day" and "With or Without You", lead guitar on "Waiting for the End"
- Brad Delson – lead guitar, backing vocals, lead acoustic guitar on "Sharp Edges", keyboards on "Waiting for the End", synthesizer on "Burn It Down", not performed on "Castle of Glass" and "Rebellion"
- Rob Bourdon – drums, not performed on "Castle of Glass", "Sharp Edges", "One More Light", "Crawling", "Rebellion", "What I've Done" and "A Light That Never Comes"
- Joe Hahn – turntables, samplers, keyboards, synthesizers, backing vocals, not performed on "Sharp Edges"
- Dave Farrell – bass, backing vocals, rhythm guitar on "Shadow of the Day", "With or Without You" and "Leave Out All the Rest", rhythm acoustic guitar on "Sharp Edges", not performed on "Castle of Glass", "Rebellion" and "What I've Done"

=== Special guests ===
- Jonathan Green – additional guitar on "Shadow of the Day", "Nobody Can Save Me", "Battle Symphony" and "Iridescent"; keyboards on "Iridescent / The Messenger", "Roads Untraveled", "Papercut" and "The Catalyst"; vocals on "Nobody Can Save Me", "Battle Symphony", "Iridescent", "Iridescent / The Messenger", "Roads Untraveled" and "Papercut"
- Blink-182 – on "What I've Done" and "I Miss You" (Mark Hoppus – bass and vocals, Travis Barker – drums, Matt Skiba – guitar and vocals)
- Jonathan Davis of Korn – vocals on "One Step Closer"
- M. Shadows of Avenged Sevenfold – vocals on "Burn It Down" and "Faint"
- Synyster Gates of Avenged Sevenfold – additional guitar on "Faint"
- Ryan Key of Yellowcard – vocals on "Shadow of the Day" and "With or Without You"
- Oli Sykes of Bring Me the Horizon – vocals on "Crawling"
- Kiiara – vocals on "Heavy"
- Daron Malakian and Shavo Odadjian of System of a Down – on "Rebellion" (Daron Malakian – guitar and vocals, Shavo Odadjian – bass)
- Adrian Young, Tony Kanal and Tom Dumont of No Doubt – on "Castle of Glass" (Adrian Young – drums, Tony Kanal – bass, Tom Dumont – guitar)
- Zedd – drums on "Crawling"
- Ryan Shuck and Amir Derakh of Dead by Sunrise – rhythm and lead guitars (both) on "One Step Closer"
- Julia Michaels – vocals on "Heavy"
- Machine Gun Kelly – rapping on "Papercut"
- Sydney Sierota of Echosmith – vocals on "Waiting for the End"
- Takahiro Moriuchi of One Ok Rock – vocals on "Somewhere I Belong"
- Gavin Rossdale of Bush – vocals on "Leave Out All the Rest"
- Alanis Morissette – vocals on "Castle of Glass" and "Rest"
- Michael Farrell – Keyboards on "Rest"
- Steve Aoki – samplers on "A Light That Never Comes"
- Bebe Rexha – vocals on "A Light That Never Comes"
- Jeremy McKinnon of A Day to Remember – vocals on "A Place for My Head"
- Deryck Whibley of Sum 41 – vocals on "The Catalyst"
- Frank Zummo of Sum 41 and Dead by Sunrise – drums on "Rebellion" and "A Light That Never Comes", percussion on "The Catalyst"
- Steven McKellar of Civil Twilight – vocals on "Nobody Can Save Me" and "Waiting for the End"
- Ilsey Juber – vocals on "Sharp Edges" and "Talking to Myself", rhythm guitar on "Talking to Myself"

The planned performance of "Castle of Glass" by No Doubt faced a change when lead vocalist Gwen Stefani withdrew two days before the event. Alanis Morissette, initially set to present her song "Rest," stepped in at the request of No Doubt members to replace Stefani. Morissette later expressed feeling nervous during the performance and frequently relied on the teleprompter.

== Set list ==
Linkin Park

1. Medley: "Robot Boy" / "The Messenger" / "Iridescent"
2. "Roads Untraveled" (live debut)
3. "Numb" (instrumental only on live video and performed with audience in concert)
4. "Shadow of the Day" / "With or Without You" (U2 cover) (performed with Ryan Key of Yellowcard)
5. "Leave Out All the Rest" (performed with Gavin Rossdale of Bush)
6. "Somewhere I Belong" (performed with Takahiro Moriuchi of One Ok Rock)
7. "Castle of Glass" (performed with Tony Kanal, Tom Dumont, and Adrian Young of No Doubt and Alanis Morissette)
8. "Rest" (new song, performed by Alanis Morissette and Michael Farell without Linkin Park)
9. "Nobody Can Save Me" (performed with Steven McKellar of Civil Twilight and Jonathan Green)
10. "Battle Symphony" (performed with Jonathan Green)
11. "Sharp Edges" (performed with Ilsey Juber)
12. "Talking to Myself" (extended bridge with snippet of "All Along the Watchtower" by Bob Dylan; performed with Ilsey Juber)
13. "Heavy" (performed with Julia Michaels and Kiiara)
14. "One More Light" (performed by Mike Shinoda, Brad Delson, and Dave Farrell)
15. "Looking for an Answer" (new song, live debut by Mike Shinoda)
16. "Waiting for the End" (extended intro with snippet of "Until It Breaks" by Linkin Park; extended outro; performed with Steven McKellar of Civil Twilight and Sydney Sierota of Echosmith)
17. "Crawling" (performed with Oliver Sykes of Bring Me the Horizon and Zedd)
18. "Papercut" (performed with Machine Gun Kelly)
19. "One Step Closer" (performed with Ryan Shuck and Amir Derakh of Dead By Sunrise/Julien-K and Jonathan Davis of Korn)
20. "A Place for My Head" (performed with Jeremy McKinnon of A Day to Remember)
21. "Rebellion" (performed with Daron Malakian and Shavo Odadjian of System of a Down and Frank Zummo of Sum 41)
22. "The Catalyst" (third chorus and bridge omitted; performed with Deryck Whibley and Frank Zummo of Sum 41)
23. "I Miss You" (performed by Blink-182 without Linkin Park)
24. "What I've Done" (performed with Mark Hoppus, Travis Barker, and Matt Skiba of Blink-182)
25. "In the End" (performed with audience)

Encore

1. "Iridescent" (reprise; bridge and outro only, performed with Jonathan Green)
2. "New Divide" (2014 shortened version; performed with pre-recorded video and vocals of Chester Bennington from the 2014 Hollywood Bowl performance)
3. "A Light That Never Comes" (performed with Steve Aoki, Frank Zummo of Sum 41, and Bebe Rexha)
4. "Burn It Down" (performed with M. Shadows of Avenged Sevenfold)
5. "Faint" (extended outro; performed with M. Shadows and Synyster Gates of Avenged Sevenfold)
6. Medley: "Bleed It Out" / "The Messenger" (first half of "Bleed It Out" segueing into the outro of "The Messenger"; performed with all special guests; includes studio voice-over of Chester Bennington on his part of "Bleed It Out")
