= One More Light World Tour =

2017 concert tour by Linkin Park

- Tour by Linkin Park
- Promotional poster for the tour
- Associated album: One More Light
- Start date: May 6, 2017
- End date: July 6, 2017
- Legs: 2
- No. of shows: 21

Linkin Park concert chronology
- The Hunting Party Tour (2014–2015); One More Light World Tour (2017); Linkin Park and Friends: Celebrate Life in Honor of Chester Bennington (2017)

The One More Light World Tour was the ninth headlining (eleventh overall) concert tour by the American rock band Linkin Park. The tour supported their seventh studio album, One More Light (2017). Beginning in May 2017, the tour visited 21 cities in South America and Europe. Following the death of lead vocalist and frontman Chester Bennington on July 20, 2017, the North American leg was cancelled the following day, followed by the final leg of the tour in Japan on October 3, 2017. It was also the last tour to feature drummer / band co-founder Rob Bourdon and lead guitarist Brad Delson, although the latter participated in the development of future shows.

== Background ==
Starting October 2016, the band announced several music festival appearances in Argentina, France and Germany. Throughout the remainder of the year, more shows were revealed. In March 2017, a promotional trailer was released on YouTube to promote standalone concerts in the U.K. This was followed by the band performing several promotional concerts and press interviews.

The band announced the North American tour with a comical trailer which was released through Genius. The trailer showed Machine Gun Kelly being interviewed and Bennington and Shinoda intervening and asking him to tour with them, resulting in his leaving the interview in amusement. Another comical video, for the promotion of Blink-182 co-headlining shows, known as "Welcome to Blinkin Park". The video included a couple on a tinder date taking Linkin Park and Blink-182 with them to decrease the awkwardness.

Tickets for the North American leg were sold through Ticketmaster's new "Verified Fan" program, an initiative to help prevent ticket scalping. The band announced $1 from each ticket sale would be donated to "Music for Relief", a charity foundation to aid survivors of natural disasters and environmental protection. Each ticket also included a physical or digital copy of the band's latest album.

Commenting on the upcoming tour, guitarist Brad Delson stated:

"Our fans know how much love we put into our live show. They know how much we enjoy the connection when we play a fan favorite on stage. The emotional and sonic content of this new batch of songs is going to bring a whole new dimension to the show."

On July 20, 2017, Chester Bennington died by suicide in his home in Los Angeles suburbs of Palos Verdes Estates, California. His final performance with the band was on July 6 at the Barclaycard Arena in Birmingham, England. The day following his death, Live Nation announced that the North American leg would be canceled, and customers would be refunded. Two months later, the band announced the cancellation of the Japan leg of the tour, while also providing refund information.

== Opening acts ==
- Machine Gun Kelly (Berlin & Kraków)
- Rise Against (Santiago)
- Turbopótamos (Lima)
- Nothing but Thieves, Sum 41, Blink-182 (Monza)
- Sum 41 (Amsterdam)
- Rob Zombie (Buenos Aires & São Paulo)
- Slayer (Buenos Aires & São Paulo)

The planned supports for the cancelled North American leg were Machine Gun Kelly (main support), One Ok Rock (Mansfield, Camden, Bristow, Uncasville, Chiba), Wu-Tang Clan (New York), and Snoop Dogg (Seattle, Vancouver, Fresno, San Jose, Chula Vista, Los Angeles).

== Set list ==
The following set list was obtained from the concert of July 3, 2017, held at The O_{2} Arena in London, England. It is not intended to represent all concerts for the duration of the tour.

1. Instrumental Sequence (contains elements of "Fallout" and "Roads Untraveled")
2. "Talking to Myself"
3. "Burn It Down"
4. "The Catalyst"
5. "Wastelands" (contains outro sample from "War")
6. "One Step Closer"
7. "Castle of Glass" (Includes M. Shinoda remix, contains excerpts from "A Place for My Head")
8. "Good Goodbye"
9. "Lost in the Echo"
10. "Battle Symphony" (occasionally replaced with "Nobody Can Save Me")
11. "New Divide"
12. "From the Inside"
13. "Invisible" (contains excerpts from "Hands Held High")
14. "Waiting for the End" (contains excerpts from "Remember the Name")
15. "Breaking the Habit"
16. "One More Light"
17. "Crawling" (Piano version)
18. "Leave Out All the Rest"
19. "Somewhere I Belong"
20. "What I've Done"
21. "In the End"
22. "Faint"
  Encore
23. "Sharp Edges" (acoustic)
24. "Numb" (contains excerpts from "Numb/Encore")
25. "Heavy"
26. "Papercut"
27. "Bleed It Out"

== Tour dates ==
List of concerts, showing date, city, country, venue, opening act, tickets sold, number of available tickets and amount of gross revenue
Date	City	Country	Venue	Support	Attendance	Revenue
Leg 1 – South America
May 6, 2017^{[A]}	Buenos Aires	Argentina	Tecnópolis	Slayer, Rob Zombie	18,812 / 20,000	$1,750,400
May 9, 2017	Santiago	Chile	Movistar Arena	Rise Against	13,489 / 14,974	$1,049,590
May 11, 2017	Lima	Peru	Estadio Nacional de Lima	Turbopótamos	31,642 / 31,642	$1,908,490
May 13, 2017^{[A]}	São Paulo	Brazil	Autódromo José Carlos Pace	Slayer, Rob Zombie	32,384 / 35,000	$2,743,850
Leg 2 - Europe
June 9, 2017^{[B]}	Paris	France	Base Aérienne 217	Blink-182, Pierce The Veil	—	—
June 11, 2017^{[C]}	Prague	Czech Republic	Prague-Letňany Airport	Simple Plan	—	—
June 12, 2017	Berlin	Germany	Mercedes-Benz Arena	Machine Gun Kelly	12,884 / 14,040	$929,122
June 14, 2017^{[D]}	Nickelsdorf	Austria	Pannonia Fields II	Five Finger Death Punch, Steel Panther, Airbourne	—	—
June 15, 2017^{[E]}	Kraków	Poland	Tauron Arena	Machine Gun Kelly	—	—
June 17, 2017^{[F]}	Monza	Italy	Autodromo Nazionale Monza	Nothing but thieves, Sum 41, Blink-182	—	—
June 18, 2017^{[G]}	Clisson	France	Hellfest	Prophets of Rage, Alter Bridge, A Day To Remember	—	—
June 20, 2017	Amsterdam	Netherlands	Ziggo Dome	Sum 41	—	—
June 22, 2017^{[B]}	Madrid	Spain	Caja Mágica	Five Finger Death Punch, A Day To Remember, Code Orange	—	—
June 24, 2017^{[H]}	Scheeßel	Germany	Eichenring	Blink-182	77,570 / 77,570	—
June 25, 2017^{[I]}	Neuhausen ob Eck	Germany	Flugplatz Neuhausen ob Eck	Blink-182	—	—
June 27, 2017^{[J]}	Sopron	Hungary	Lővér Camping Site	—N/a	45,000 / 45,000	—
June 29, 2017^{[K]}	Norrköping	Sweden	Norrköping-Bråvalla Airfield	Adept	34,509 / 50,000	—
July 1, 2017^{[L]}	Werchter	Belgium	Rock Werchter	System of a Down, Blink 182, Jimmy Eat World	—	—
July 3, 2017	London	England	The O_{2} Arena	Stormzy (appearance for "Good Goodbye")	16,249 / 18,228	$1,241,970
July 4, 2017	London	England	Brixton Academy	Stormzy (appearance for "Good Goodbye")	—	—
July 6, 2017	Birmingham	England	Barclaycard Arena	—N/a	—	—
Total					125,460 / 133,884	$9,623,422

=== Cancelled dates ===
List of cancelled concerts, showing date, city, country, and venue
Date	City	Country	Venue	Reason
July 7, 2017	Manchester	England	Manchester Arena	Damages from the Manchester Arena bombing were not repaired in time
July 27, 2017	Mansfield	United States	Xfinity Center	Death of Chester Bennington
July 28, 2017^{[M]}	New York City	United States	Citi Field	Death of Chester Bennington
July 30, 2017^{[M]}	Hershey	United States	Hersheypark Stadium	Death of Chester Bennington
August 1, 2017	Camden	United States	BB&T Pavilion	Death of Chester Bennington
August 2, 2017	Bristow	United States	Jiffy Lube Live	Death of Chester Bennington
August 5, 2017	Uncasville	United States	Mohegan Sun Arena	Death of Chester Bennington
August 7, 2017	Clarkston	United States	DTE Energy Music Theatre	Death of Chester Bennington
August 8, 2017	Toronto	Canada	Budweiser Stage	Death of Chester Bennington
August 10, 2017	Montreal	Canada	Bell Centre	Death of Chester Bennington
August 12, 2017	Cincinnati	United States	Riverbend Music Center	Death of Chester Bennington
August 14, 2017	Tinley Park	United States	Hollywood Casino Amphitheatre	Death of Chester Bennington
August 15, 2017	Saint Paul	United States	Xcel Energy Center	Death of Chester Bennington
August 17, 2017	Charlotte	United States	PNC Music Pavilion	Death of Chester Bennington
August 19, 2017	Tampa	United States	MidFlorida Credit Union Amphitheatre	Death of Chester Bennington
August 20, 2017	West Palm Beach	United States	Perfect Vodka Amphitheatre	Death of Chester Bennington
August 22, 2017	Houston	United States	Toyota Center	Death of Chester Bennington
August 23, 2017	San Antonio	United States	AT&T Center	Death of Chester Bennington
August 25, 2017	Dallas	United States	Starplex Pavilion	Death of Chester Bennington
August 26, 2017	Oklahoma City	United States	Chesapeake Energy Arena	Death of Chester Bennington
August 28, 2017	Denver	United States	Pepsi Center	Death of Chester Bennington
August 30, 2017	Phoenix	United States	Talking Stick Resort Arena	Death of Chester Bennington
September 1, 2017	Stateline	United States	Lake Tahoe Outdoor Arena	Death of Chester Bennington
September 2, 2017	Las Vegas	United States	MGM Grand Garden Arena	Death of Chester Bennington
October 14, 2017	Seattle	United States	KeyArena	Death of Chester Bennington
October 15, 2017	Vancouver	Canada	Rogers Arena	Death of Chester Bennington
October 17, 2017	Fresno	United States	Save Mart Center	Death of Chester Bennington
October 18, 2017	San Jose	United States	SAP Center	Death of Chester Bennington
October 20, 2017	Chula Vista	United States	Mattress Firm Amphitheatre	Death of Chester Bennington
October 22, 2017	Los Angeles	United States	Hollywood Bowl	Death of Chester Bennington
November 2, 2017	Chiba	Japan	Makuhari Messe	Death of Chester Bennington
November 4, 2017	Chiba	Japan	Makuhari Messe	Death of Chester Bennington
November 5, 2017	Chiba	Japan	Makuhari Messe	Death of Chester Bennington

Festivals and other miscellaneous performances

^{A} Maximus Festival
^{B} Download Festival
^{C} Aerodrome
^{D} Nova Rock Festival
^{E} Impact Festival
^{F} Independent Days Festival
^{G} Hellfest Open Air
^{H} Hurricane Festival
^{I} Southside Festival
^{J} Volt Fesztivál
^{K} Bråvalla festival
^{L} Rock Werchter
^{M} Welcome to Blinkin Park

== Personnel ==
- Chester Bennington – lead vocals
- Rob Bourdon – drums, percussion
- Brad Delson – lead guitar, keyboards on "Waiting for the End", acoustic guitar on "Sharp Edges", synthesizer on "Burn It Down"
- Dave "Phoenix" Farrell – bass guitar, backing vocals, samplers on "Good Goodbye" and "Lost in the Echo", rhythm guitar on "Leave Out All the Rest"
- Joe Hahn – turntables, samples, backing vocals
- Mike Shinoda – lead vocals, rhythm guitar, keyboards, piano, rapping, backing vocals
