= One More Light (song) =

- Steve Aoki Chester Forever Remix cover art

Single by Linkin Park

from the album One More Light
- Released: October 3, 2017
- Recorded: 2016
- Genre: Electronic rock; ambient
- Length: 4:15
- Label: Warner Bros.; Machine Shop
- Songwriters: Mike Shinoda; Eg White
- Producers: Mike Shinoda; Brad Delson; RAC; Emily Wright

Linkin Park singles chronology
"Darker Than the Light That Never Bleeds" (2017)	"One More Light" (2017)	"She Couldn't" (2020)

Music video
- "One More Light" on YouTube "One More Light" (Lyric Video) on YouTube

"One More Light" is a ballad by American rock band Linkin Park from their seventh studio album of the same name. It also is their last official major single with two of their longtime members (Chester Bennington, who died by suicide three months prior to the single's release, and drummer and band co-founder Rob Bourdon). The song was co-written with Eg White and was released to US contemporary hit radio on October 3, 2017, as the album's third and final single. It is Bennington's second posthumously released single.

The music video for this song was nominated for Best Rock Video at the 2018 MTV Video Music Awards.

== Background ==
In late 2016, Shinoda revealed that he had worked with British songwriter Eg White on a song. In an interview leading up to the reveal of the album's lead single, "Heavy", Shinoda revealed that White had worked with him on the song "One More Light" while Brad Delson attended the funeral of one of the band's friends. When asked what he wanted to write about by White, Shinoda said that the only thing he could think about was the friend who had passed. He revealed that, in spite of the horrible inevitability of loss, the song is about letting people know that you care.

Later on, the band revealed the friend was Amy Zaret, a 25-year veteran of Warner Bros. Records who died in October 2015 following a cancer diagnosis. Shinoda said,

We had a friend who worked for the record label for a long time and came up with us from years and years ago. She started out in radio promo and was basically driving us to the local radio stations in the U.S. Midwest, eventually getting promoted and promoted. At some point last year, I suddenly heard that she'd got cancer - and then all of a sudden she had died. We knew we absolutely had to write about what happened. It's a sad song, but the pay-off is that when something dramatic and painful like that happens, the most important thing to do is to connect with the people you love and remind them you care about them.

The band surprised some of the people who worked at Warner with the song, and people reacted very emotionally to it, with some weeping, giving hugs, and telling stories. They played the song on Jimmy Kimmel Live! and dedicated it to their late friend Chris Cornell, who had died a day before.

After lead singer Chester Bennington's suicide on July 20, 2017, the band selected "One More Light" as their next single. Shinoda wrote "One More Light was written with the intention of sending love to those who lost someone. We now find ourselves on the receiving end. In memorial events, art, videos, and images, fans all over the world have gravitated towards this song as their declaration of love and support for the band and the memory of our dear friend, Chester. We are so very grateful and can't wait to see you again."

On October 25, 2017, American DJ/Producer and Linkin Park collaborator Steve Aoki released his remix of "One More Light", as his second tribute song to Bennington following his mashup, "Darker Than The Light That Never Bleeds", which was released a month earlier.

During an interview with The Guardian in July 2025, Shinoda shared that "One More Light" would no longer be performed live, as he felt performing it would "feel weird", saying, "[It was originally written] for a woman at the label that we worked with who passed away, then after Chester passed, the world decided that it was about him. And so that’s just too sad to play."

== Music video ==
The official video was uploaded to Linkin Park's YouTube channel on September 18, 2017, and directed by Joe Hahn and Mark Fiore. It features footage of Chester performing in the middle of fans, footage of him at live shows such as Live in Texas and Road to Revolution: Live at Milton Keynes, and past music videos for their past singles "Burn It Down", "Waiting for the End" and "Powerless", as well as the band themselves through the years. On making the music video, Hahn said:

It has been incredibly emotional to work on this, and especially to watch it. I feel that by doing it, we not only faced some of our biggest fears, but it enabled us to use our talents to bring some light to people that need it. As we move forward to the Hollywood Bowl show and beyond, I think about the people that connect with the band, outside and inside our circle. This video is a gesture of good will to the people that want that connection.

== Personnel ==
Band

- Chester Bennington – lead vocals
- Brad Delson – guitars, production
- Dave "Phoenix" Farrell – bass guitar
- Joe Hahn – samples, programming
- Mike Shinoda – backing vocals, keyboards, production

Additional musicians

- Guitar and piano by Eg White

Production

- Written by Mike Shinoda and Francis White
- Produced by Mike Shinoda and Brad Delson
- Vocal production by Emily Wright
- Music performed by Linkin Park
- Vocals by Chester Bennington and Mike Shinoda
- Chester's vocals recorded at The Pool Recording Studio, London, UK
- Mike's vocals recorded at The Warehouse Studio, Vancouver, British Columbia, Canada
- Music recorded at Larrabee Studios, North Hollywood, CA and Sphere Studios, North Hollywood, CA
- Engineered by Ethan Mates, Mike Shinoda and Josh Newell
- Assistant engineer: Alejandro Baima
- Studio B assistant engineer: Warren Willis
- Studio drum tech: Jerry Johnson
- Mixed by Manny Marroquin at Larrabee Studios, North Hollywood, CA
- Mix engineer: Chris Galland assisted by Jeff Jackson and Robin Florent

== Charts ==
=== Weekly charts ===
Weekly chart performance for "One More Light"
Chart (2017–18)	Peak position
Australia (ARIA)	85
Austria (Ö3 Austria Top 40)	35
Canada Hot 100 (Billboard)	91
Czech Republic Singles Digital (ČNS IFPI)	24
Ecuador (National-Report)	56
France (SNEP)	111
Germany (GfK)	51
Hungary (Single Top 40)	30
Hungary (Stream Top 40)	40
Italy (FIMI)	79
Philippines (Philippine Hot 100)	55
Portugal (AFP)	61
Scottish Singles Sales (Official Charts)	49
Slovakia Singles Digital (ČNS IFPI)	37
Switzerland (Schweizer Hitparade)	48
UK Singles Downloads (OCC)	53
UK Singles Sales (OCC)	53
US Bubbling Under Hot 100 (Billboard)	4
US Digital Song Sales (Billboard)	36
US Adult Pop Airplay (Billboard)	35
US Hot Rock & Alternative Songs (Billboard)	6
US Rock & Alternative Airplay (Billboard)	37

=== Year-end charts ===
Year-end chart performance for "One More Light"
Chart (2017)	Position
US Hot Rock & Alternative Songs (Billboard)	26

Chart (2018)	Position
US Hot Rock & Alternative Songs (Billboard)	89

== Certifications ==
Certifications for "One More Light"
Region	Certification	Certified units/sales
France (SNEP)	Platinum	200,000^{‡}
Germany (BVMI)	Gold	300,000^{‡}
Italy (FIMI)	Gold	25,000^{‡}
New Zealand (RMNZ)	Platinum	30,000^{‡}
Poland (ZPAV)	Platinum	50,000^{‡}
United Kingdom (BPI)	Platinum	600,000^{‡}
United States (RIAA)	Platinum	1,000,000^{‡}
^{‡} Sales+streaming figures based on certification alone.

== Release history ==
Region	Date	Format	Label	Ref.
United States	October 2, 2017	Hot adult contemporary radio	Warner Bros.	
United States	October 3, 2017	Contemporary hit radio	Warner Bros.	
