= Darker Than the Light That Never Bleeds =

Single by Linkin Park and Steve Aoki
- Released: September 8, 2017
- Recorded: 2017
- Genre: EDM
- Length: 4:03
- Label: Warner Bros.; Dim Mak
- Songwriters: Linkin Park; Steve Aoki
- Producer: Steve Aoki

Linkin Park singles chronology
"Talking to Myself" (2017)	"Darker Than the Light That Never Bleeds" (2017)	"One More Light" (2017)

Steve Aoki singles chronology
"Lit" (2017)	"Darker Than the Light That Never Bleeds" (2017)	"$4,000,000" (2017)

"Darker Than the Light That Never Bleeds" (also known as "Darker Than the Light That Never Bleeds (Chester Forever Steve Aoki Remix)") is a mashup remix song by American electro house musician Steve Aoki. Remixing and mashing up the songs "A Light That Never Comes" and "Darker Than Blood", both of which were collaboratively written and recorded by Linkin Park and Aoki, it is a tribute by Aoki to Linkin Park's late lead singer Chester Bennington following his death. It was released as a single on September 8, 2017.

== Background ==
The song was mashed up and remixed by Steve Aoki. It is a mashup of Aoki and Linkin Park's previous two collaborations, "A Light That Never Comes", which was released in 2013 from Linkin Park's second remix album Recharged, and "Darker Than Blood" from Aoki's third studio album Neon Future II. The song was released as a tribute from the DJ to Chester Bennington after the former's death nearly a month before the release. Aoki tweeted that all the proceedings from the single would be donated in Chester's name to Music for Relief's One More Light fund, which was open for suicide prevention and named after the band's last studio album with Bennington.

== Charts ==
Chart performance for "Darker Than the Light That Never Bleeds"
Chart (2017)	Peak position
US Dance/Electronic Digital Songs (Billboard)	20
