= Lit (Steve Aoki and Yellow Claw song) =

Single by Steve Aoki and Yellow Claw featuring Gucci Mane and T-Pain

from the album Kolony
- Released: July 28, 2017
- Genre: Trap; hip hop; EDM
- Length: 2:49
- Label: Ultra

Steve Aoki singles chronology
"Night Call" (2017)	"Lit" (2017)	"Darker Than the Light That Never Bleeds" (2017)

Yellow Claw singles chronology
"Open" (2017)	"Lit" (2017)	"New World" (2017)

Gucci Mane singles chronology
"Fetish" (2017)	"Lit" (2017)	""do re mi" (Remix)" (2017)

T-Pain singles chronology
"Senza Pagare" (2017)	"Lit" (2017)

"Lit" is a song by American DJ Steve Aoki and Dutch DJ duo Yellow Claw featuring American rapper Gucci Mane and American singer T-Pain. It was released on July 28, 2017, as a single from the former's album Kolony.

== Background ==
The collaboration happened when Aoki facetimed T-Pain who was in Las Vegas, and invited him to go to his house. Aoki then played the beat for T-Pain who then suggested to invite Mane to feature on the song. They then sent the unfinished song to Mane's crew to add his part before sending it to Yellow Claw who completed the track.

== Charts ==
Chart (2017)	Peak position
US Hot Dance/Electronic Songs (Billboard)	34
