= Emily Wright =

American record producer

- Born: July 1, 1980 (age 46); Hartford, Connecticut, U.S.
- Origin: Wethersfield, Connecticut, U.S.
- Genres: Pop
- Occupations: Record producer; audio engineer; songwriter
- Years active: 2007–present

Emily Wright (born July 1, 1980) is an American songwriter, record producer and audio engineer based in Los Angeles.

== Early life ==
Wright grew up in Wethersfield, Connecticut, graduating from Glastonbury High School and the Greater Hartford Academy of the Arts in 1998. Wright studied theater and directing at New York University and, upon graduation, worked in sound design in theater, working in New York, Chicago and Minneapolis, and then in television.

== Career ==
After getting laid off from a job in television, Wright was introduced by a mutual friend to songwriter and producer Dr. Luke. Wright started her career by running errands for Gottwald before becoming an engineer, vocal producer and songwriter.

Wright's first official credit was as engineer on Lil Mama's VYP (Voice of the Young People). Since then, she has recorded and produced for numerous performers including Katy Perry, Britney Spears, Ke$ha, Miley Cyrus, Jessie J, Flo Rida, Kelly Clarkson, Cobra Starship, Taio Cruz, Adam Lambert and Karmin. Some of her notable tracks are Cyrus's "Party in the USA," Miranda Cosgrove's "Kissin U," Spears' "Circus," Clarkson's "My Life Would Suck Without You," & Perry's "I Kissed A Girl" and "Hot N Cold".

In 2010, Wright began work on Katy Perry's Teenage Dream as an engineer. The album would go on to earn four Grammy nominations, including Album of the Year and Best Pop Vocal Album. That same year, Wright recorded and vocal edited eight songs on Ke$ha's Animal. The following year, Wright engineered eight songs and co-wrote one song ("Gasoline") on Britney Spears' Femme Fatale.

In February 2012, Wright began working with musician Adam Young and Owl City. That same year, Wright wrote and co-produced "Brokenhearted" off Karmin's Hello EP. In 2016, Emily co-wrote "Call Me When You Get There" and "You Can Have Mine" off Dan Layus's solo album "Dangerous Things". In February 2019, Wright collaborated as a vocal producer with Sekai no Owari (End of the World) and Static & Ben El.

In 2025, Wright expanded into musical theatre, composing the music and lyrics for the original musical Better Days alongside collaborator Brian Logan Dales of the band The Summer Set. The show features a book by Eric Garcia and is set in a dive bar in Arizona over the course of three "Blackout Wednesdays" spanning a decade. A world premiere industry reading of the production was held on August 7, 2025, at the Los Angeles LGBT Center's Renberg Theatre. Directed by Kenneth Ferrone, the reading's cast included Emma Hunton, Alex Boniello, and Scott Porter.

== Personal life ==
Wright married Matt Thiessen, lead singer of band Relient K, in New York City on August 23, 2015. They divorced on February 23, 2018.

== Discography ==
Year	Artist	Album	Details
2007	Leona Lewis	Spirit	audio engineer ("I Will Be")
2007	Miranda Cosgrove	iCarly	audio engineer ("About You Now")
2008	Lil Mama	VYP (Voice of the Young People)	audio engineer ("Broken Pieces")
2008	Katy Perry	One of the Boys	audio engineer ("I Kissed a Girl", "Hot n Cold")
2008	Vanessa Hudgens	Identified	audio engineer ("Identified", "First Bad Habit", "Don't Ask Why", "Amazed", "Set it Off")
2008	Britney Spears	Circus	audio engineer, vocal editing ("Circus", "Shattered Glass", "Lace and Leather")
2009	Kelly Clarkson	All I Ever Wanted	audio engineer, vocal editing ("My Life Would Suck Without You")
2009	Flo Rida	R.O.O.T.S.	audio engineer, vocal editing ("Right Round", "Touch Me")
2009	Ciara	Fantasy Ride	audio engineer, vocal editing ("Tell Me What Your Name Is")
2009	Jordin Sparks	Battlefield	audio engineer, vocal editing ("Watch You Go")
2009	Pitbull	Rebelution	audio engineer, vocal editing ("Girls")
2009	Miley Cyrus	The Time of Our Lives	vocal producer, audio engineer, vocal editing ("Party in the U.S.A.", "The Time of Our Lives")
2009	Adam Lambert	For Your Entertainment	vocal producer, audio engineer ("For Your Entertainment")
2010	Ke$ha	Animal	audio engineer, vocal editing ("Tik Tok", "Your Love Is My Drug", "Take It Off", "Kiss N Tell", "Hungover", "Blind", "Dancing with Tears in My Eyes", "Animal")
2010	Miranda Cosgrove	Sparks Fly	vocal producer, audio engineer, vocal editing ("Kissin' U", "There Will Be Tears")
2010	Three 6 Mafia	Laws of Power	audio engineer, vocal editing ("Shots After Shots", "Go To Work")
2010	3OH!3	Streets of Gold	audio engineer, vocal editing ("My First Kiss", "Streets of Gold")
2010	B.o.B	B.o.B Presents: The Adventures of Bobby Ray	audio engineer, vocal editing ("Magic")
2010	Lil Jon	Crunk Rock	audio engineer, vocal editing ("Hey")
2010	Katy Perry	Teenage Dream	audio engineer ("Teenage Dream", "Last Friday Night (T.G.I.F.)", "California Gurls", "E.T.", "The One That Got Away",)
2010	Taio Cruz	Rokstarr	audio engineer ("Dynamite")
2010	Victoria Justice	Victorious	audio engineer, vocal editing ("Make It Shine", "Leave It All to Shine")
2010	Ke$ha	Cannibal	audio engineer, vocal editing ("We R Who We R", "Sleazy", "Blow", "Crazy Beautiful Life", "Grow a Pear", "Cannibal")
2010	Kelly Rowland	Here I Am	vocal producer, audio engineer ("Rose Colored Glasses")
2010	Nelly	5.0	audio engineer ("Move That Body")
2010	Usher	Versus	audio engineer ("DJ Got Us Fallin' in Love")
2011	Britney Spears	Femme Fatale	writer, vocal producer ("Gasoline"), vocal producer, audio engineer ("How I Roll", "(Drop Dead) Beautiful", "Trip To Your Heart"), audio engineer ("Hold it Against Me", "Till The World Ends", "Inside Out", "Seal It with a Kiss")
2011	Jessie J	Who You Are	audio engineer, vocal producer ("Domino"), audio engineer ("Price Tag" featuring B.o.B))
2011	Pitbull	Planet Pit	audio engineer ("Come N Go")
2011	Sabi	Upcoming Debut Album	vocal producer, ("Wild Heart")
2011	Flo Rida	Only One Flo (Part 1)	audio engineer ("Who Dat Girl")
2011	Cobra Starship	Night Shades	vocal producer ("You Make Me Feel..." featuring Sabi)
2011	New Boys	Too Cool to Care	vocal producer ("Tough Kids" featuring Sabi)
2011	T.I.	No Mercy	audio engineer ("That's All She Wrote")
2012	Sabi	Upcoming Debut Album	vocal producer ("Where They Do That At")
2012	Flo Rida	Wild Ones	vocal producer ("Good Feeling")
2012	Karmin	Hello	Co - writer, Co - Producer ("Brokenhearted")
2012	Miranda Cosgrove	iCarly	writer, vocal producer ("Million Dollars" "All Kinds of Wrong")
2012	Adam Lambert	Trespassing	vocal producer ("Better Than I Know Myself", "Never Close Our Eyes", "Naked Love")
2012	Owl City	Shooting Star	writer ("Gold", "Take it All Away")
2012	Rome	Dedication (EP)	vocal producer ("Seasons")
2012	Owl City	The Midsummer Station	writer ("Dreams and Disasters", "Gold", "Embers", "Take it All Away")
2012	Marina and the Diamonds	Electra Heart	vocal producer ("How to Be a Heartbreaker")
2012	Cody Simpson	Paradise	vocal producer ("Wish U Where Here" featuring Becky G.)
2012	Cher Lloyd	Sticks + Stones	writer ("Oath" featuring Becky G.)
2012	One Direction	Take Me Home	vocal producer ("Rock Me")
2012	Ke$ha	Warrior	vocal producer ("C'mon", "Wonderland", "Last Goodbye", "Gold Transam", "Out Alive") additional vocal producer ("Warrior", "Thinking Of You") audio engineer ("Crazy Kids", "Only Wanna Dance With You", "Love into the Light")
2013
2013	The Summer Set	Legendary	writer ("Lightning in a Bottle")
2013	Big Time Rush	24/Seven	writer ("Like Nobody's Around")
2013	Britney Spears	The Smurfs 2 Soundtrack	vocal producer ("Ooh La La")
2013	Owl City	The Smurfs 2 Soundtrack	writer ("Live It Up")
2013	Relient K	Collapsible Lung	writer ("Can't Complain"), vocal producer ("That's My Jam" featuring Owl City)
2013	Gavin Degraw	Make a Move	vocal producer ("Make A Move")
2014
2014	Karmin	Pulses	writer, vocal producer ("Night Like This")
2014	Cher Lloyd	Sorry I'm Late	writer, vocal producer ("Goodnight")
2014	Better Than Ezra	All Together Now	writer ("Undeniable")
2015
2015	Hilary Duff	Breathe In. Breathe Out.	vocal producer ("Sparks", "Lies")
2015	Britney Spears and Iggy Azalea	Pretty Girls	vocal producer ("Pretty Girls")
2015	Giorgio Moroder	Déjà Vu	vocal producer ("Tom's Diner" featuring Britney Spears)
2015	Owl City	Mobile Orchestra	writer ("Verge", "Back Home" featuring Jake Owen, "Unbelievable" featuring Hanson)
2015	Sekai no Owari	Attack on Titan Soundtrack	vocal producer ("Dragon Night", "Anti-Hero", "SOS")
2015	Ben Rector	Brand New	writer ("Crazy")
2015	Augustana	EP	writer ("You Can Have Mine")
2016
2016	The Summer Set	Stories for Monday	writer ("The Night is Young", "All Downhill from Here")
2016	Relient K	Look On Up	writer ("Look On Up")
2016	Dan Layus	Dangerous Things	writer ("Call Me When You Get There", "You Can Have Mine")
2017	Linkin Park	One More Light	vocal producer ("Invisible", "Heavy", "One More Light" and "Sharp Edges")
2017	Betty Who	The Valley	vocal producer ("Free to Fly" (feat. Warren G), "Wanna Be", "Blue Heaven Midnight Crush", "Make You Memories", "Reunion")
2017	Coin	How Will You Know If You Never Try	writer ("Don't Cry, 2020", "Hannah")
2018	Kalie Shorr	Awake	writer ("Candy")
2018	Bryce Vine	Carnival	vocal producer ("Deep in Shallow Waters", "Love Me Hate Me", "Factory Love")
2018	Static & Ben El Tavori	US single releases	vocal producer, writer ("Broke Ass Millionaire", "Tudo Bom")
2020	Britney Spears	Glory (2020 deluxe re-issue)	vocal production ("Swimming in the Stars")
2020	Sekai no Owari	Chameleon	writer ("Fangs"), vocal producer (full album)
