= Dropped Frames =

- Dropped Frames: Vol. 1 cover art

Studio album by Mike Shinoda
- Released: July 10, 2020 (Vol. 1); July 31, 2020 (Vol. 2); September 18, 2020 (Vol. 3)
- Recorded: 2020
- Length: 34:23 (Vol. 1); 30:11 (Vol. 2); 36:46 (Vol. 3)
- Label: Kenji Kobayashi
- Producer: Mike Shinoda

Mike Shinoda chronology
Post Traumatic (2018)	Dropped Frames (2020)

Singles from Dropped Frames
- 1. "Open Door" Released: June 30, 2020; 2. "Licence to Waltz" Released: September 9, 2020

Dropped Frames is a multi-album project by American hip hop musician Mike Shinoda, currently consisting of three volumes. Dropped Frames, Vol. 1 was released on July 10, 2020, with subsequent volumes following on July 31 and September 18 of the same year. The project was composed interactively with fans on Shinoda's Twitch channel. All three albums were distributed via Kenji Kobayashi Productions, Shinoda's own company capitally related to Machine Shop co. With the exception of the opening track of volume 1, "Open Door", tracks on Dropped Frames are primarily instrumental.

== Background ==
When the COVID-19 quarantine began, Shinoda became enamored of Twitch. The singer spent Monday through Friday making art on Twitch while fans gave feedback. Four days of every week involved making music, while one day per week was dedicated to creating visual art.

In late June 2020, Shinoda announced that he planned to publish his second studio album in early July 2020. He also stated that the songs were made with the assistance of fans who viewed his Twitch channel. At that time, he also allowed free streaming of songs "Open Door", "Super Galaxtica" and "Osiris". The song "Open Door" has vocals from Shinoda and over half a dozen fans worldwide. The remainder of the album is entirely instrumental with multiple genres represented.

== Critical reception ==
Kelsey Chapman of Alternative Press describes Dropped Frames, Vol. 1 as "an abnormally relaxed and joyful record to come out during a time marred by shared social tension and fear".

Brenton Blanchet of Spin characterized Dropped Frames, Vol. 1 as "a mesh of 'Mariachi,' 'Bollywood hip-hop' and '90's boy band pop' suggestions, featuring flute loops, Nintendo Game Boy-driven chords and vocal chants made up of hundreds of fan submissions".

== Track listing ==
All tracks are written by Mike Shinoda.

Dropped Frames, Vol. 1 track listing
No.	Title	Length
1.	"Open Door"	3:06
2.	"Super Galaxtica"	2:29
3.	"Duckbot"	2:09
4.	"Cupcake Cake"	3:15
5.	"El Rey Demonio"	2:44
6.	"Doodle Buzz"	3:50
7.	"Channeling, Pt. 1" (featuring Dan Mayo)	3:52
8.	"Osiris"	3:18
9.	"Babble Bobble"	1:54
10.	"Session McSessionface"	3:24
11.	"Neon Crickets"	3:25
12.	"Booty Down"	0:57
Total length:		34:23

Dropped Frames, Vol. 2 track listing
No.	Title	Length
1.	"Transitions"	2:59
2.	"Crystalina"	3:30
3.	"Julio's Revenge"	1:49
4.	"Isolation Bird" (featuring Money Mark)	3:03
5.	"Side Scrolling"	3:24
6.	"Dungeon Crawler"	1:33
7.	"Dog Whistles"	2:14
8.	"Astral" (featuring Elise Trouw)	2:24
9.	"Sunset Drive"	2:39
10.	"Channeling, Pt. 2" (featuring Dan Mayo)	2:30
11.	"King Paprika"	2:22
12.	"Party Meow"	1:44
Total length:		30:11

Dropped Frames, Vol. 3 track listing
No.	Title	Length
1.	"Dream Fragment"	2:47
2.	"Sound Collector"	2:58
3.	"Dust Code"	3:53
4.	"No Delete"	2:39
5.	"Robot Yodel"	2:24
6.	"Vibe Train"	2:19
7.	"Mike's Gonna Mike"	2:01
8.	"Shoreline"	3:04
9.	"Goodbye Cow"	3:20
10.	"Genesis Supernova"	1:09
11.	"Sidechain Gang"	2:36
12.	"Overcast"	2:16
13.	"A Thousand Jams"	2:53
14.	"Licence to Waltz"	2:27
Total length:		36:46

== Personnel ==
- Mike Shinoda – instrumentation, engineer, mastering, producer, vocals
- Ai Mori – vocals
- Debbie Darroch – vocals
- Jessy Boray – vocals
- Joar Westerlund – vocals
- Pershard Owens – vocals
- Sage Douglas – vocals
- Slava – vocals
- Dan Mayo – drums (track 7, vol 1 and track 10, vol 2)

== Charts ==
=== Vol. 1 ===
Chart performance for Dropped Frames, Vol. 1
Chart (2020)	Peak position
UK Album Sales (OCC)	94
UK Album Downloads (OCC)	15
UK Dance Albums (OCC)	2
UK Independent Albums (OCC)	26

=== Vol. 2 ===
Chart performance for Dropped Frames, Vol. 2
Chart (2020)	Peak position
UK Album Downloads (OCC)	51

=== Vol. 3 ===
Chart performance for Dropped Frames, Vol. 3
Chart (2020)	Peak position
UK Album Downloads (OCC)	94
