= Invisible (Linkin Park song) =

Promotional single by Linkin Park

from the album One More Light
- Released: May 10, 2017
- Genre: Pop rock
- Length: 3:34
- Label: Warner Bros.; Machine Shop
- Songwriters: Mike Shinoda; Justin Parker
- Producers: Mike Shinoda; Brad Delson

Music video
- "Invisible" (Lyric Video) on YouTube

"Invisible" is a song by American rock band Linkin Park. It was released from their seventh studio album, One More Light. The song was written by Mike Shinoda and Justin Parker. The song is sung by Mike Shinoda with Chester Bennington on backing vocals. The song premiered on May 10, 2017, at Zane Lowe's World Record show on Beats 1.

== Writing and recording ==
Mike Shinoda met with English songwriter and producer Justin Parker in London for a writing session during The Hunting Party Tour. Shinoda later told Ticketmaster, "I did a couple of stopovers in London on the way back from the Hunting Party tour and worked with two different songwriters and really enjoyed it. I thought it was super fun and saw merit in keeping that going. I took the songs back to the band and asked them what they thought. They loved the material, first and foremost." One of those tracks was "Invisible", a song that deals with Shinoda wanting to concentrate on being a father.

Throughout the process, both Shinoda and Bennington recorded vocals for the song, but since "Invisible" is Shinoda's story, he decided he should be the one singing on the final version. The song was written about his kids and the thought that when they get older and become teenagers, it will be harder to discipline them. According to him, "Invisible" sends the listener to that moment when, in a parental or mentoring situation, you have to tell your kids something they don't wanna hear and you want them to know you're doing it because you care, not because you want to hurt their feelings.

== Release and promotion ==
The song was released from their seventh studio album One More Light. It was released digitally on May 10, 2017. The band released a lyric video of the song on the same day.

== Live performances ==
The song's first live performance was in front of the audience who were in attendance at the taping of James Corden's The Late Late Show in February. The performance aired on the June 12, 2017, episode. The first public performance was during Maximus Festival 2017 at the Santiago, Chile show. The track has been performed multiple times since then.

== Personnel ==
Credits from streaming website.

Linkin Park

- Mike Shinoda – lead vocals, keyboard, piano
- Chester Bennington – backing vocals
- Brad Delson – guitars, backing vocals
- Phoenix – bass guitar, backing vocals
- Joe Hahn – programming, sampler, backing vocals
- Rob Bourdon – drums, backing vocals

Additional musicians

- Jesse Shatkin – additional keyboards, additional programming

Production

- Produced by Mike Shinoda and Brad Delson
- Co-produced by Jesse Shatkin
- Additional Production by RAC
- Written by Mike Shinoda and Justin Parker
- Vocal production by Emily Wright
- Engineered by Mike Shinoda, Ethan Mates and Josh Newell
- Engineering assisted by Alejandro Baima and Warren Willis
- Mixed by Serban Ghenea
- Mixing engineered by John Hanes
- Technician: Jerry Johnson

== Charts ==
Chart performance for "Invisible"
Chart (2017)	Peak position
Czech Republic Singles Digital (ČNS IFPI)	66
Scotland Singles (OCC)	90
UK Singles Downloads (OCC)	100
UK Singles Sales (OCC)	100
US Hot Rock & Alternative Songs (Billboard)	32
