= Heavy (Linkin Park song) =

2017 single by Linkin Park

Single by Linkin Park featuring Kiiara

from the album One More Light
- Released: February 16, 2017
- Genre: Pop; electropop; alternative pop; pop rock; R&B
- Length: 2:49
- Label: Warner Bros.; Machine Shop
- Songwriters: Mike Shinoda; Brad Delson; Chester Bennington; Justin Tranter; Julia Cavazos
- Producers: Mike Shinoda; Brad Delson

Linkin Park singles chronology
"Darker Than Blood" (2015)	"Heavy" (2017)	"Good Goodbye" (2017)

Kiiara singles chronology
"Dopemang" (2016)	"Heavy" (2017)	"Whippin" (2017)

Music video
- "Heavy" on YouTube "Heavy" (Lyric Video) on YouTube

"Heavy" is a song by American rock band Linkin Park, featuring guest vocals from American singer Kiiara. The song is the first single from their seventh studio album, One More Light. The song was written by Linkin Park members Chester Bennington, Brad Delson, and Mike Shinoda, alongside Julia Michaels and Justin Tranter. The single was released for download on February 16, 2017, and was premiered on radio on February 21. It is the band's last commercial single to be released during Bennington's lifetime.

== Writing and recording ==
Band members Chester Bennington, Mike Shinoda, and Brad Delson worked with Julia Michaels and Justin Tranter in co-writing the song's lyrics, who had previously worked with artists such as Justin Bieber, Selena Gomez, and Gwen Stefani. Lyrically, the inspiration for "Heavy" came from band member's conversations about frustrations and troubles in their own lives. From that, they found that there was some heavy stuff happening in each other's lives. Bennington stated that personally, he has a hard time with life, even on a good day. He said the opening line "I don't like my mind right now" is him 24 hours a day. In an interview with Music Choice, Bennington said of the song: "Most of my problems are problems that I cause myself. That's what that song's about – that time when you consciously look at that. Once you acknowledge what it is, you can separate yourself from it and do something about it, as opposed to just being in it."

In a series of videos released leading up to the single's debut, Joseph Hahn brought up the idea of bringing in a female singer for the track, which he described as "something that feels out of the box for us, could give [the song] that dynamic it needs." Bennington, in working with Michaels on writing the track and hearing her rough vocal takes, suggested she sing on the final version, though she declined, stating she would rather be behind the scenes. Bennington recorded a version entirely with his vocals in case the band could not find a fit for a female singer, while the band continued their search.

The band was introduced to Kiiara through Zane Lowe, who, upon interviewing her, was informed that Linkin Park was her favorite band. Lowe reached out to vocalist Shinoda, who was intrigued considering how different Kiiara's music, like her single "Gold", was from Linkin Park's previous works. Zane put Shinoda in contact with Kiiara, and the band ended up deciding to work with her. Kiiara only recorded vocals for the song, as the lyrics and music had already been written prior to her involvement. Music producers Emily Wright and Andrew Bolooki handled vocal production. The band approved of the overall sound, with Shinoda noting that adding the female voice brought more meaning to the song, signaling that it is not just about one person's struggle.

== Critical reception ==
"Heavy" received generally negative reviews from critics, with complaints generally centered around the band's move from nu metal to a pop-oriented sound. Anna Gaca of Spin found the song to be a failed attempt to stay relevant against current popular rap rock bands like Twenty One Pilots, concluding that "So: How bad is 'Heavy'? It's not as bad as you'd think. It will annoy you no more and no less than any other blowout pop duet else you're likely to hear on the radio while you're at the gym or the supermarket or something. It's fairly astonishing to see Linkin Park bend their knee so shamelessly for a taste of the charts, but those are the rules of the game." Emmy Mack of Music Feeds was similarly negative, noting the irony of naming the track "Heavy" when the song sounded like "a dance-pop duet featuring Chester doing a really bad Twenty One Pilots impersonation and trading verses with a random guest pop vocalist." Allison Stewart of The Washington Post called the song "lumbering" and stated that it "emulates, in feel if not in sound, the Chainsmokers' 'Closer' with Kiiara standing in for Halsey."

Fan reaction to the song has been equally negative. The negativity inspired the band Bloodywood to re-record the song in the style of Hybrid Theory and Meteora nu metal sound, catching the attention of many music websites such as Loudwire and Team Rock, the latter of which declared it "what Linkin Park's Heavy should have sounded like." The cover and negative reception even caught the attention of the band, who halfheartedly played a part of it in a rehearsal session video, with Bennington jokingly stating at the end "There's your fuckin' Hybrid Theory now shut the... [fuck up]".

== Release and promotion ==
The song was released as the first single from their seventh studio album, One More Light. It was released digitally on February 16, 2017. The music video for the song was released on March 9 through their official YouTube channel. The band released a lyric video of the song on the same day. It is the band's last single to be released in vocalist Chester Bennington's lifetime, as he died by suicide five months after its release.

=== Live performances ===
The song was performed live on the day of the single's release via Facebook as a "stripped down", acoustic version with Shinoda on piano, Delson on guitar, and Bennington and Kiiara on vocals, along with a similar performance of past singles "Burn It Down" and "Crawling". The entire band with Kiiara then performed the song live together on The Late Late Show with James Corden on February 27, 2017. It was also performed with the entire band during ECHO Music Awards in Germany on April 6, 2017.

"Heavy" was performed by the remaining members of Linkin Park with guests Kiiara and Julia Michaels during the 'Linkin Park and Friends: Celebrate Life in Honor of Chester Bennington' tribute concert on October 27, 2017.

== Music video ==
The music video starts with Chester Bennington and Kiiara grappling with doubles of themselves, with Kiiara's double lingering while Bennington begins to fight with his. Eventually, Bennington leaves his house to attend his support group. During discussions, he gets into a confrontation with one of the group members, while Kiiara is shown watching them from the under the brim of her hoodie. Bennington leaves in a fury and enters a bathroom. In the bathroom, he engages in a fist fight with his double. Then Kiiara is shown entering the same bathroom where Bennington is shown pushed by his demon to the wall and falls down and is caught by Kiiara. The video ends with the two sitting together, Kiiara putting her hand onto Bennington's shoulder.

== Commercial performance ==
"Heavy" debuted at number 52 on the US Billboard Hot 100, selling 35,000 downloads in its first week. The song slid down to number 82 the following week and slowly rose to number 50, where it peaked. The song re-entered the chart in August 2017, after the death of frontman Chester Bennington, and reached a new peak of 45. It was also certified Gold in September 2017.

== Track listing ==
Digital download, UK promotional CD single
No.	Title	Length
1.	"Heavy" (feat. Kiiara)	2:49

European CD single
No.	Title	Length
1.	"Heavy" (feat. Kiiara) (Album Version)	2:49
2.	"Heavy" (feat. Kiiara) (Instrumental Version)	2:49

Digital download (Nicky Romero Remix)
No.	Title	Length
1.	"Heavy" (feat. Kiiara) (Nicky Romero Remix)	3:29

Digital download (Disero Remix)
No.	Title	Length
1.	"Heavy" (feat. Kiiara) (Disero Remix)	3:28

European promotional CD single
No.	Title	Length
1.	"Heavy" (Album Version)	2:49
2.	"Heavy" (Instrumental)	2:49
3.	"Heavy" (Acapella)	2:49
4.	"Heavy" (TV Track)	2:49

Benelux promotional CD single (Benelux)
No.	Title	Length
1.	"Heavy" (feat. Kiiara) (Explicit Version)	2:49
2.	"Heavy" (feat. Kiiara) (Nicky Romero Remix)	3:29

== Personnel ==
Linkin Park

- Chester Bennington – lead vocals
- Mike Shinoda – keyboards, backing vocals, production
- Brad Delson – guitars, production
- Dave "Phoenix" Farrell – bass guitar
- Joe Hahn – samples, programming
- Rob Bourdon – drums

Additional musicians

- Kiiara – vocals

Production

- Written by Mike Shinoda, Brad Delson, Chester Bennington, Julia Michaels and Justin Tranter
- Music performed by Linkin Park
- Vocals by Chester Bennington and Kiiara
- Background vocals by Mike Shinoda
- Produced by Mike Shinoda and Brad Delson
- Vocal production by Emily Wright and Andrew Bolooki
- Mixed by Serban Ghenea
- Kiiara appears courtesy of Atlantic Recording Corp.

Remix

Nicky Romero Remix produced by:

- Niels van de Pavert
- Nick Rotteveel
- Mischa Lugthart

Notes

- Credits from streaming website.

== Charts ==
=== Weekly charts ===
Weekly chart performance for "Heavy"
Chart (2017)	Peak position
Australia (ARIA)	33
Austria (Ö3 Austria Top 40)	9
Belgium (Ultratip Bubbling Under Flanders)	4
Canada Hot 100 (Billboard)	46
Canada AC (Billboard)	50
Canada CHR/Top 40 (Billboard)	24
Canada Hot AC (Billboard)	26
Czech Republic Airplay (ČNS IFPI)	29
Czech Republic Singles Digital (ČNS IFPI)	5
France (SNEP)	112
Germany (GfK)	12
Hungary (Rádiós Top 40)	29
Hungary (Single Top 40)	21
Hungary (Stream Top 40)	23
Ireland (IRMA)	70
Italy (FIMI)	59
Malaysia (RIM)	2
Netherlands (Single Top 100)	100
New Zealand (Recorded Music NZ)	35
Philippines (Philippine Hot 100)	39
Poland Airplay (ZPAV)	37
Portugal (AFP)	41
Scottish Singles Sales (Official Charts)	25
Slovakia Airplay (ČNS IFPI)	36
Slovakia Singles Digital (ČNS IFPI)	26
Slovenia (SloTop50)	40
Spain (Promusicae)	44
Sweden (Sverigetopplistan)	82
Switzerland (Schweizer Hitparade)	8
UK Singles (Official Charts)	43
US Billboard Hot 100	45
US Adult Pop Airplay (Billboard)	11
US Dance Airplay (Billboard)	28
US Hot Rock & Alternative Songs (Billboard)	2
US Pop Airplay (Billboard)	16
US Rock & Alternative Airplay (Billboard)	44

=== Year-end charts ===
Year-end chart performance for "Heavy"
Chart (2017)	Position
Latvia Airplay (LaIPA)	67
US Adult Top 40 (Billboard)	38
US Hot Rock Songs (Billboard)	5

== Certifications ==
Certifications for "Heavy"
Region	Certification	Certified units/sales
Australia (ARIA)	Gold	35,000^{‡}
Germany (BVMI)	Gold	200,000^{‡}
Italy (FIMI)	Gold	25,000^{‡}
New Zealand (RMNZ)	Platinum	30,000^{‡}
Portugal (AFP)	Gold	5,000^{‡}
Switzerland (IFPI Switzerland)	Gold	10,000^{‡}
United Kingdom (BPI)	Silver	200,000^{‡}
United States (RIAA)	2× Platinum	2,000,000^{‡}
^{‡} Sales+streaming figures based on certification alone.
