= Dan Mayo =

Israeli drummer and composer (born 1990)

Dan Mayo דן מאיו
- Dan Mayo

Background information
- Born: 1 July 1990 (age 36)
- Origin: Tel Aviv, Israel
- Genres: Jazz; avant-garde; post-rock; jazz fusion; funk
- Occupations: Drummer; composer
- Instrument: Drums
- Label: Independent
- Website: mayodrummer.com

Dan Mayo (Hebrew: דן מאיו; born 1 July 1990) is an Israeli musician and composer best known as the drummer of Tatran, a power trio with Tamuz Dekel on guitar and Offir Benjaminov on bass.

== Biography ==
Mayo began playing the drums at the age of three, participating in musical events at school from the age of six, while developing skills on the piano, saxophone, and marimba. He dropped out of high school in order to focus on his drumming and music and went to study at a music academy, from which he also eventually dropped out. He began creating spiritual, avant-garde music.

Apart from playing with his band Tatran, Mayo also tours with Ester Rada.

== Discography ==
=== Solo ===
- Big Brown Eyes (2019)
- Woodhouse (live, 2020)

=== with CRuNCH 22 ===
- CRuNCH 22 (2013)
- Alice's Adventures in Wonderland (2016)
- Lush Flush (2018)

=== with Ester Rada ===
- Ester Rada (2014)
- I Wish (2015)
- Different Eyes (2017)

=== with Tatran ===
Studio albums

- Shvat (2014)
- Foresee (2018)
- Evermore (2024)

EPs

- No Sides (2017)

Live albums

- Soul Ghosts (2015)
- Border View (2020)
- Merchant House (2020)
- On Hold with Eden Ladin (2020)
- Two Days with Eyal Talmudi (2020)

=== with dema ===
- love (2016)

=== with Yehezkel Raz ===
- Zu (2018)
- Before (2020)
- Session 1 (2020)
- Tree (2020)

=== with Yemen Blues ===
- Only Love Remains (2024)
