= Battle Symphony (song) =

Promotional single by Linkin Park

from the album One More Light
- Released: March 16, 2017
- Genre: Pop rock; electropop
- Length: 3:36
- Label: Warner Bros.; Machine Shop
- Songwriters: Mike Shinoda; Brad Delson; Jonathan Green
- Producers: Mike Shinoda; Brad Delson

Music video
- "Battle Symphony" (Lyric Video) on YouTube

"Battle Symphony" is a promotional single by American rock band Linkin Park. The song was recorded by the band for their seventh studio album, titled One More Light. The song appears on the album as the fourth track. The song was written by Linkin Park members Brad Delson and Mike Shinoda. The song was released on March 16, 2017, but it was leaked some days before.

== Background ==
The title "Battle Symphony" was first seen in a picture posted on Joe Hahn's Instagram story on September 6, 2016, of Brad playing acoustic guitar with the band's song board behind him, he also copyrighted. The band premiered the lyrics on Genius.com.

== Music video ==
On January 12, Melissa Fox, a photographer from Moscow, Russia who was temporarily working in Los Angeles, ran into Linkin Park and confirmed that they were shooting a music video at the 4th Street Bridge. BMX rider Alfredo Mancuso also ran into the band that same day and lent his drone to the band so they could shoot some footage with it.

The "Battle Symphony" lyric video was released on March 16, 2017 and received 4.8 million views during its first week on YouTube. As of 17 March 2025, the lyric video has gained over 100 million views.

== Usage in media ==
This song is used in the video game by Konami, Pro Evolution Soccer 2018. This is the second time a song from Linkin Park had featured since All for Nothing with Page Hamilton.

This song is used in the 2017 NBA Playoffs.

== Personnel ==
Linkin Park

- Chester Bennington – lead vocals
- Rob Bourdon – drums, percussion
- Brad Delson – guitars
- Dave "Phoenix" Farrell – bass guitar, backing vocals
- Joe Hahn ("Mr. Hahn") – programming, samplers
- Mike Shinoda – keyboards, backing vocals

Production personnel

- Produced by Mike Shinoda and Brad Delson
- Written by Mike Shinoda, Brad Delson and Jon Green
- Vocals by Chester Bennington, Mike Shinoda and Dave Farrell
- Vocal production by Andrew Bolooki
- Engineered by Mike Shinoda, Ethan Mates and Josh Newell
- Mixed by Manny Marroquin
- Mixing engineered by Chris Galland
- Mixing assisted by Robin Florent and Jeff Jackson
- Mastered by Chris Gehringer

Notes

- Credits from streaming website.

== Charts ==
Chart performance for "Battle Symphony"
Chart (2017)	Peak position
Czech Republic Airplay (ČNS IFPI)	83
Czech Republic Singles Digital (ČNS IFPI)	27
Germany (GfK)	95
Hungary (Single Top 40)	21
Portugal (AFP)	71
Scotland (OCC)	80
Slovakia Singles Digital (ČNS IFPI)	52
Switzerland (Schweizer Hitparade)	90
UK Singles Sales (OCC)	83
UK Singles Downloads (OCC)	83
US Hot Rock & Alternative Songs (Billboard)	11
