= Good Goodbye (Linkin Park song) =

Promotional single by Linkin Park featuring Pusha T and Stormzy

from the album One More Light
- Released: April 13, 2017
- Genre: Rap rock; pop-rap; electropop
- Length: 3:31
- Label: Warner Bros.; Machine Shop
- Songwriters: Linkin Park; Pusha T; Stormzy; Jesse Shatkin
- Producers: Brad Delson; Mike Shinoda; Jesse Shatkin; Andrew Bolooki^{[a]}

Linkin Park chronology
"Heavy" (2017)	"Good Goodbye" (2017)	"Talking to Myself" (2017)

Music video
- "Good Goodbye" on YouTube

"Good Goodbye" is a promotional single by American rock band Linkin Park, featuring guest vocals from American rapper Pusha T and British rapper Stormzy. The song is a promotional single from their seventh studio album, One More Light. The song was written by Linkin Park members, with Pusha T and Stormzy writing their own verses. The song was released for download on April 13, 2017.

== Background ==
According to Mike Shinoda, the song was thought of very early in the process of creating the album. He came up with the hook and the track in a day while working alone with Jesse Shatkin. Mike originally had two verses on the song and wanted to add an electronic drop to the bridge, but it didn't sound good and he thought a third rap verse by him would be too much, so they started thinking about who they could bring in on the track for rap verses. That ended up being Pusha T (who was previously featured on DJ Vice's remix of "I'll Be Gone") and Stormzy.

Explaining how the collaboration with Stormzy came together, Shinoda said:

Our manager ran into Stormzy's manager, and mentioned we had a couple of songs that Stormzy would sound great on. He came through right at the last moment, understandably, since he's [busy] dropping the biggest record you’ve ever heard. We didn't know how crazy it was [for Stormzy] over here, by the way, we just liked him from afar."

According to Chester Bennington, Stormzy had been on the band's radar for quite a while.

== Music video ==
A lyric video for "Good Goodbye" was directed by Rafatoon and released on April 13, 2017, on Linkin Park's official YouTube channel. During a Facebook chat on April 2, 2017, Mike Shinoda had announced Linkin Park was working on a new video for a new song that is "not super silly, but it's still not very serious," commenting that it was a change of pace for the band. It was later revealed that the music video was for the song "Good Goodbye". It has been filmed in Los Angeles over a day, and Stormzy, who is featured on the track, flew out to be a part of it.

The official music video was later released by the band on YouTube on May 5, 2017. Featuring NBA legend and former basketball player Kareem Abdul-Jabbar, the videogame-inspired visual features Chester, who has to score points in a basketball dunk contest to save his life, while having Abdul-Jabbar play as the judge keeping score. The video is intercut with shots of Bennington, Shinoda, Pusha T and Stormzy performing their verses.

Commenting on the video to Billboard for an episode of the Ballin' Out podcast, Bennington later said, "In keeping with the theme of basketball, the video we shot [for 'Good Goodbye'] features, in my opinion, the greatest player of all time is the emperor of a dunk contest to the deaths in which I have to go up against round after round of dunking on dudes to save my life. I think we're kind of known for our more serious stuff but this is a fun distraction from being so serious all the time."

== Personnel ==
Linkin Park

- Chester Bennington – lead vocals, backing vocals
- Rob Bourdon – drums, backing vocals, percussion
- Brad Delson – guitars, backing vocals
- Dave "Phoenix" Farrell – bass, backing vocals
- Joe Hahn ("Mr. Hahn") – samples, backing vocals, programming
- Mike Shinoda – rap vocals, keyboards, backing vocals

Additional musicians

- Pusha T – vocals
- Stormzy – vocals

Production

- Composition – Brad Delson, Mike Shinoda, Jesse Shatkin, Terrance Thornton and Michael Omari
- Vocal production – Andrew Bolooki
- Additional production – Jesse Shatkin

Notes

- ^a Signifies a vocal producer
- Credits from streaming website.

== Charts ==
Chart performance for "Good Goodbye"
Chart (2017)	Peak position
Austria (Ö3 Austria Top 40)	69
Czech Republic Airplay (ČNS IFPI)	15
Czech Republic Singles Digital (ČNS IFPI)	19
France (SNEP)	173
Germany (GfK)	65
New Zealand Heatseekers (RMNZ)	6
Portugal (AFP)	70
Scotland (OCC)	59
Switzerland (Schweizer Hitparade)	49
UK Singles Downloads (OCC)	61
UK Singles Sales (OCC)	61
US Hot Rock & Alternative Songs (Billboard)	15

== Certifications ==
Certifications for "Good Goodbye"
Region	Certification	Certified units/sales
United Kingdom (BPI)	Silver	200,000^{‡}
^{‡} Sales+streaming figures based on certification alone.
