= Talking to Myself (song) =

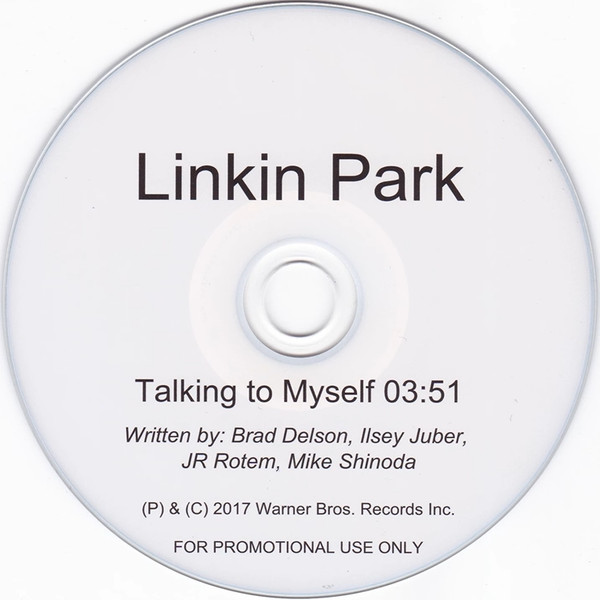

Single by Linkin Park

from the album One More Light
- Released: July 25, 2017
- Genre: Pop rock; electropop; electronic rock; R&B
- Length: 3:51
- Label: Warner Bros.; Machine Shop
- Songwriters: Mike Shinoda; Brad Delson; Ilsey Juber; J.R. Rotem
- Producers: Mike Shinoda; Brad Delson; J.R. Rotem; Bolooki; Andrew Jackson

Linkin Park singles chronology
"Good Goodbye" (2017)	"Talking to Myself" (2017)	"Darker Than the Light That Never Bleeds" (2017)

Music video
- "Talking to Myself" on YouTube

"Talking to Myself" is a song by American rock band Linkin Park. The song is the third single from their seventh studio album, One More Light and was released on July 25, 2017. The music video was released on July 20, 2017, the same day that Linkin Park's lead vocalist, Chester Bennington, was found dead by suicide. It is Chester Bennington's first posthumously released single.

== Music video ==
Screenshot from the music video, showing Bennington looking out the window of a vehicle

The music video, which features footage of the band performing at various places and rehearsing, was edited and directed by Mark Fiore. It was released several hours before Chester Bennington was confirmed dead.

The music video reached over 10.1 million views on YouTube in one day, making it one of the most viewed online videos in the first 24 hours. The official video uploaded to Linkin Park's YouTube channel on July 20, 2017, was shorter than the previously released audio-only video and the video released to other sites such as Vevo; it was later fixed to play the full song, with the last shot being of Bennington in a vehicle looking out at a window.

As of September 2024, the music video for "Talking to Myself" has over 150 million views on YouTube.

== Critical reception ==
The song received mixed reviews from critics. Ian Gittins of The Guardian called it "a sleek Justin Bieber-style pop-R&B nugget". Allison Stewart of The Washington Post stated, "the electro-poppy 'Talking to Myself' sounds like the work of a '90s boy band". In a negative review, Anita Bhagwandas of NME commented that the song "is full of unsophisticated hooks and forgettable melodies". Jon Pareles of The New York Times described it as "a pounding plaint about loneliness, alienation and 'all the walls that you keep building.'"

== Charts ==
=== Weekly charts ===
Weekly chart performance for "Talking to Myself"
Chart (2017–18)	Peak position
Austria (Ö3 Austria Top 40)	52
Canada Hot 100 (Billboard)	66
Czech Republic Airplay (ČNS IFPI)	22
Czech Republic Singles Digital (ČNS IFPI)	23
France (SNEP)	181
Germany (GfK)	73
Hungary (Rádiós Top 40)	23
Hungary (Single Top 40)	7
Hungary (Stream Top 40)	16
Philippines (Philippine Hot 100)	18
Portugal (AFP)	79
Slovakia Singles Digital (ČNS IFPI)	36
Switzerland (Schweizer Hitparade)	35
UK Audio Streaming (OCC)	50
US Bubbling Under Hot 100 (Billboard)	9
US Hot Rock & Alternative Songs (Billboard)	13

=== Year-end charts ===
Year-end chart performance for "Talking to Myself"
Chart (2017)	Position
Hungary (Rádiós Top 40)	91
Hungary (Single Top 40)	67
