= One More Light =

Studio album by Linkin Park
- Released: May 19, 2017
- Recorded: September 2015 – February 2017
- Studios: Larrabee, Van Nuys, California; Sphere, Los Angeles, California; The Pool Recording Studio, London, UK; The Warehouse, Vancouver, British Columbia, Canada
- Genres: Pop; pop rock; electropop; electronic rock
- Length: 35:19
- Labels: Warner Bros.; Machine Shop
- Producers: Mike Shinoda; Brad Delson

Linkin Park chronology
Mall: Music from the Motion Picture (2014)	One More Light (2017)	One More Light Live (2017)

Singles from One More Light
- 1. "Heavy" Released: February 16, 2017; 2. "Talking to Myself" Released: July 25, 2017; 3. "One More Light" Released: October 3, 2017

One More Light is the seventh studio album by American rock band Linkin Park. It was released on May 19, 2017, through Warner Bros. Records and Machine Shop. It is the band's first album to have a title track, as they felt that the song "One More Light" was the heart of the album. It is also the band's final album to feature two of their longtime members: co-lead vocalist Chester Bennington, who died by suicide two months after the album's release, and drummer and co-founder Rob Bourdon, who opted not to return for the band's reformation in 2024.

The band recorded the album between September 2015 and February 2017 in multiple studios. Band members Brad Delson and Mike Shinoda served as the album's primary producers. The sound of One More Light has been described as being more pop-focused, departing from the alternative rock and alternative metal sounds of their previous albums. The album features guest vocal appearances from Pusha T, Stormzy, and Kiiara, and production and songwriting collaborations with J. R. Rotem, Julia Michaels, Justin Tranter, Ross Golan, Andrew Goldstein, Blackbear, and Eg White.

The album's lead single, "Heavy", featuring Kiiara, was released on February 16, 2017. "Battle Symphony", "Good Goodbye", and "Invisible" were released as promotional singles prior to the album's release. "Talking to Myself" and "One More Light" were released as radio singles later on. The album received mixed reviews from music critics; this, along with accusations of selling out, prompted an angry response from Bennington. One More Light performed well commercially, debuting at number one in several countries. It also became the band's fifth number-one album on the Billboard 200 and was certified gold in five countries.

== Background ==
In 2014, Linkin Park released their sixth studio album The Hunting Party. Mike Shinoda began the pre-production of One More Light on his smartphone in mid-2015 during The Hunting Party Tour. The main production began as soon as the tour ended. In the process, the band decided to write songs with some external help. They worked with Zayed Hassan, which resulted in his song "Sailing Through the Clouds", Martin Garrix, Hot Karl, Mike Baczor of the band Her0, The Lonely Island, which resulted in "Things in My Jeep", and One Ok Rock. None of these collaborations, however, made the final version of the album. The album marks the second to be self-produced following The Hunting Party.

== Composition ==
As a new concept to the band, all the songs featured on the album began with vocals being recorded first. They worked on the story first, then the hook, and finally the music. In an interview with Zane Lowe, Shinoda explained the composition as, "In terms of the style of the record, it's one of the most diverse stylistically, there's more genres mashed into this album than anything we've ever put out. You don't hear a lot of super heavy guitars. There isn't any screaming on the record." He adds, "To some extent it is a very polished record. Stylistically we wanted to blend all of the sound and genres together in a way you can’t tell them apart". As to why they chose "Heavy" to present the album to the world, he told Billboard, "One of the reasons why we chose 'Heavy' as the first single is because it is really the core sound of the album. This wasn't a scenario where the whole album sounds one way and the single sounds different. This is how the album sounds. So we wanted to go out with a song like that, where everybody can get a sense of the direction of this body of work." According to him, a lot of songs on the album can make the listener think of old songs by The Cure or Tears for Fears.

In an interview with MusicRadar, Brad Delson explained,

I wound up putting a lot of guitar on this album. There’s a lot of layers and a lot of different guitars. The guitar work is nuanced and complementary to all of the other elements that we have put in there. I find guitar to be a dominant ingredient in any soup. The minute I put loud heavy guitars into an arrangement, I feel like it is a heavy colour. One of the goals of the production of this album was to do away with any notion of genre. We were looking at ways to juxtapose influences that we have in ways that you haven’t heard before. Building the guitar work into that was a fun challenge. I love the guitar work and tones that our engineer Ethan helped create with me and Mike [Shinoda] throughout this album. Even though you don’t hear guitar in the foreground in a heavy-handed way, there really is a ton of guitar on this album, and I’m really proud of it.

— Brad Delson

Further elaborating on his guitar work, Delson said, "I love the acoustic work on 'Sharp Edges'. I really like all of the layering of guitars on 'Invisible' as well. There's also a really unique presentation of the guitar in a way that I don’t think we’ve ever done on a song called 'Sorry For Now'. That was one of the things that we were really excited about – it is wildly different to anything else that we have been doing."

The album features collaborations with songwriters and other artists. "Heavy" features vocals by pop singer Kiiara, and "Good Goodbye" features verses by rappers Pusha T and Stormzy. Genre-wise, the album has been described as pop, pop rock, electropop, and electronic rock.

== Recording ==
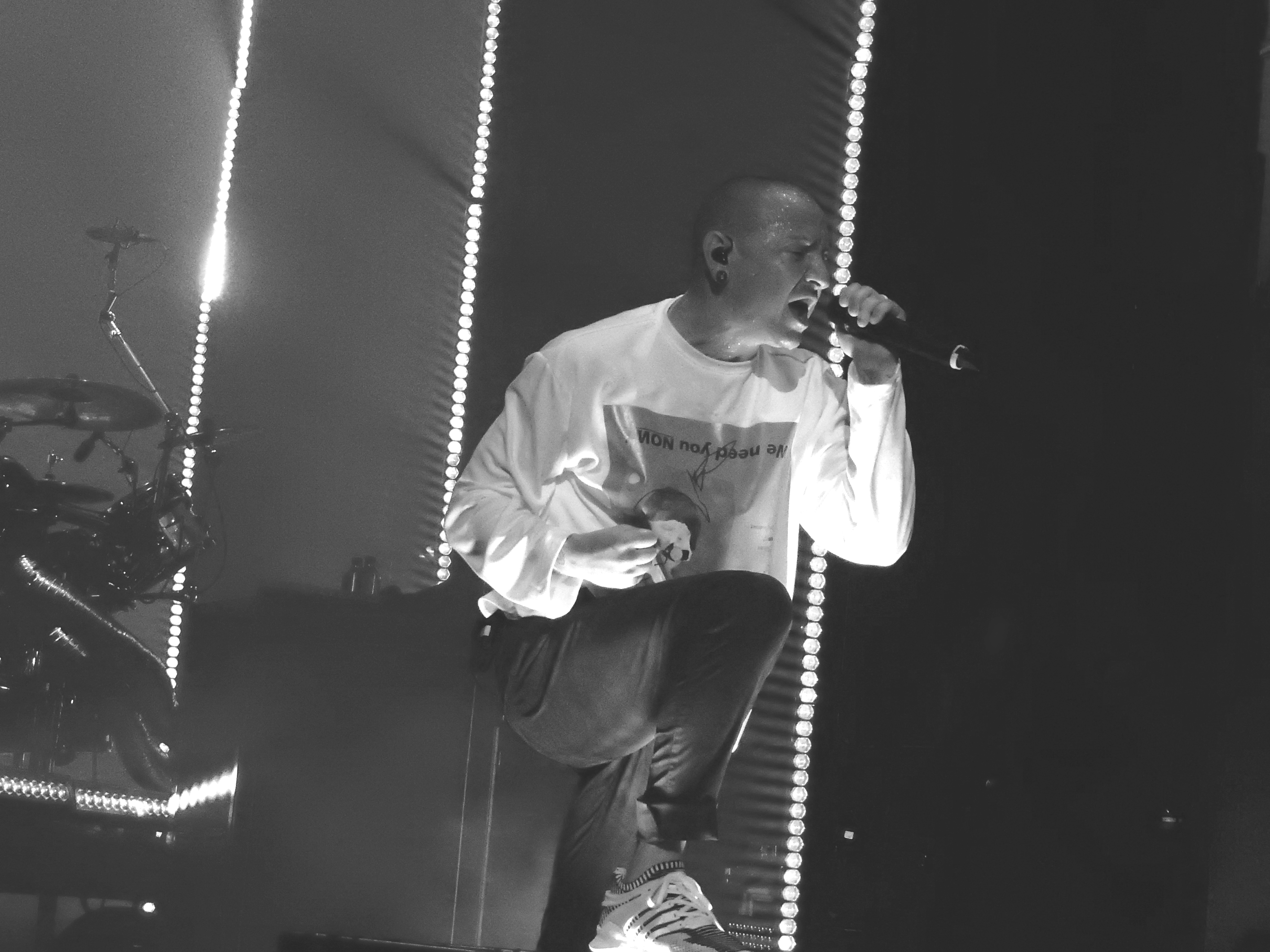
One of Bennington's final performances with Linkin Park on July 4, 2017, at the O2 Brixton Academy in London.

The band had been writing and recording mostly in Los Angeles but also had a few sessions in London and Canada where they worked with a few songwriters. In Los Angeles, the band started working at the Larrabee Studios where they had worked for their previous album. After noticing the band needed a bit more space they shifted to Sphere Studios. Starting in early 2016 the band decided to open up their process to fans through social media by doing live streams, posting pictures and videos of their day by day in the studio, and sending studio updates to their mailing list.

In an interview with Billboard, Shinoda said "We've focused almost exclusively on songwriting, not on sound, not on genre, not on arrangement, on words and melodies. And that is something Rick [Rubin] has always told us to do years past and we never listened because we started always track first. Now we're writing songs and now we're just starting to get into the style of that." While working with Justin Parker in London, Mike also learned a different approach to songwriting: to write without any sound in mind and, instead, write with meaning in mind. Instead of writing tracks piece by piece, the band wouldn't leave a session without having a song. It would all start as a conversation, and out of those the songs would build progressively from a chord progression to lyrics.

Among the collaborators are Justin Parker, Conner Youngblood, Jon Green, blackbear, Andrew Goldstein, Eg White, Emily Wright, Andrew Bolooki, Andrew Dawson, RAC, Corrin Roddick, and Ross Golan. American singer Kiiara also had a seven-hour session with Linkin Park to record her vocals for "Heavy", and rappers Stormzy and Pusha T contributed to the album with original verses. In the past, the band had a different approach to collaborations, as explained by Mike: "Usually it means we’ve finished the song but we'll ask somebody to add something to the top of it." He added: "Generally, here's how it would work: we'd get in the room with someone, and start on something from scratch with them. We worked mostly in the same way we always write songs, but with extra firepower in the room."

Bennington had also reached out to Billy Howerdel of A Perfect Circle to collaborate on a song for the album. The two collaborated on a track titled "Eat the Elephant", but it was ultimately left off the album, due to it not matching the direction of One More Light's sound. Howerdel completely reworked the song musically and lyrically, and recorded it with Maynard James Keenan on vocals for their April 2018 album Eat the Elephant.

== Artwork and packaging ==
In an interview with Kerrang! magazine, Shinoda explained that the children seen on the album cover are those of a friend of the band and represent what the band members feel when their respective families get together. The photo was shot at Venice Beach by Frank Maddocks, who has previously contributed to artworks for Deftones and Green Day's Revolution Radio. The album cover also somewhat resembles the logo of the film company Lakeshore Entertainment.

The album was made available on Linkin Park's official website in five different packages: CD + LPU membership, vinyl + LPU Membership, CD bundle, vinyl bundle, and the "Just Give Me Everything" box set. All offers were accompanied by an LPU digital membership. Both the CD bundle and vinyl bundle include a One More Light T-shirt and a silver Linkin Park logo enamel pin. The box set was bound inside a special One More Light super deluxe box with a 48-page hardcover book featuring all the best photos from the album package and all the lyrics, a unique 2.4" × 1.8" instant photo of the band, and a gold enamel pin set featuring a Linkin Park pin, an LP Hex logo pin, and a "OML" logo pin. It also included both the CD and vinyl versions of the album as well as the One More Light T-shirt.

== Promotion ==
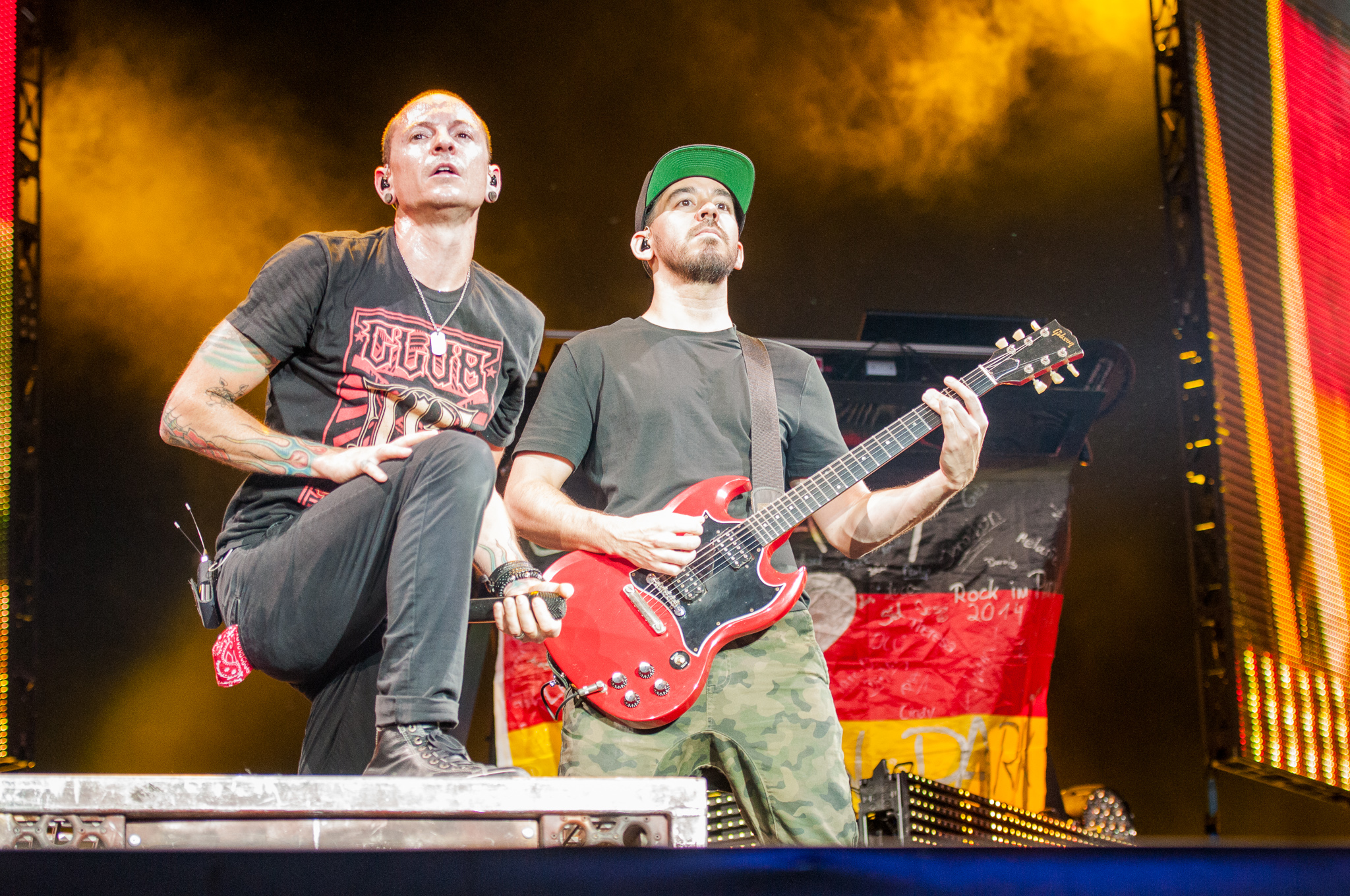
Chester Bennington (left) and Mike Shinoda (right) performed fourteen press promo shows for the promotion of the album.

The first single, "Heavy", was released via Los Angeles radio station KROQ on February 16, 2017. The track is a duet with American singer and songwriter Kiiara, marking the first time a Linkin Park song from a studio album has featured a female vocalist. The song was written by Linkin Park with Julia Michaels and Justin Tranter, while Emily Wright and Andrew Bolooki handled vocal production. The band released a second track from the album, "Battle Symphony", on March 16, 2017, with an accompanying lyric video. A third track from the album, "Good Goodbye", was released for download on April 13, 2017, along with an accompanying lyric video followed by a music video. The song features American rapper Pusha T and English hip hop artist Stormzy. On May 10, 2017, the band put out one final pre-release track, "Invisible", with an accompanying lyric video. "Talking to Myself" was sent to alternative radio July 25, 2017, as the album's second official single. The music video for "Talking to Myself" was released on July 20, 2017, the same day of Bennington's death.

In early 2017, the band introduced Linkin Park Global Ambassadors, which were selected each for a country. The ambassadors would promote the Linkin Park updates in their respective countries. The Ambassadors were also given various tasks respective to the updates. For promotional purposes, a picture of TV color bars was uploaded to the Instagram by the Linkin Park Global Ambassadors and many other people related to the band such as Joe Hahn, Mike Shinoda, Chester Bennington, Phoenix, Lorenzo Errico, Adam Ruehmer, Jim Digby, Christian Tachiera, Tobias Fance, Frank Maddocks, Tal Cooperman, and Warner Bros. Records' official account. The band also released a series of 8 videos on their official website showing fans their process of creating songs for the album. On February 13, Linkin Park tweeted a blank grid, and each of the Linkin Park Global Ambassadors tweeted a numbered image. When put together, the images formed the album cover. The lyrics of "Heavy" were unveiled on Genius on the same day.

Linkin Park did a stripped-down performance with Kiiara at NRG Studios, which was broadcast live on Facebook the same day "Heavy" was released along with its lyric video and the album pre-order. The stripped-down version of the song was performed on various occasions. Shinoda and Bennington played the song fourteen times at different venues for the promotion. The band played the song on The Late Late Show with James Corden and at the ECHO Awards 2017 with Kiiara.

Acoustic performances of the lead single by Chester Bennington and Mike Shinoda helped promote One More Light. A few of them included performances with Kiiara, Waxx, and Sofia Karlberg.

The band embarked on a world tour in the promotion of the album, which began in South America in May 2017. The tour included stops at various festivals, including the Download Festival Paris, Aerodrome Festival, NovaRock, Impact Festival, I-Days Milano, Hellfest, Download Festival Madrid, Hurricane Festival, Southside Festival, Telekom VOLT Fesztivál, Bråvalla Festival, Rock Werchter, and many others. The tour visited 20 cities in South America and Europe. The North American and Japan legs of the tour were cancelled following Chester Bennington's death on July 20, 2017.

== Reception ==
=== Critical reception ===
Professional ratings
Aggregate scores
Source	Rating
AnyDecentMusic?	4.0/10
Metacritic	46/100
Review scores
Source	Rating
AllMusic	3/5 stars
The Arts Desk	1/5 stars
Classic Rock Magazine	1/5 stars
Consequence of Sound	D+
Evening Standard	2/5 stars
The Irish Times	2/5 stars
Newsday	B+
NME	1/5 stars
Rock Sound	6/10
Sputnikmusic	3.7/5

According to the review aggregator Metacritic, One More Light received "mixed or average reviews" based on a weighted average score of 46 out of 100 from 7 critic scores. NME criticized the album's quality, giving it a 2/10 score and concluding that "It’s harsh to criticise a great band for trying something different, and it’s not an issue that this is a pop album. The issue is that it’s a weak and contrived commercial move (perhaps to compete with the likes of Twenty One Pilots)." Neil Z. Yeung of AllMusic agreed, stating that "The issue isn't that it's a pop effort; indeed, they get points for a brave attempt so outside of their wheelhouse. The problem is that much of One More Light is devoid of that visceral charge that previously defined much of their catalog... there's no feral screaming from Chester Bennington, there are barely any riffs, and DJ Hahn has disappeared beneath the textured studio sheen." Team Rock criticized the move away from rock music, stating that the album "makes Ed Sheeran sound like Extreme Noise Terror...With One More Light, Linkin Park have waved goodbye to rock." Troy L. Smith at The Plain Dealer described "Invisible" and "Nobody Can Save Me" as "well-rounded pop songs," but also noting, "That won't stop Linkin Park diehards from getting a sweet tooth from the whiny 'Halfway Right' or the boring title track. Heck, even Skrillex-like EDM can't save 'Sorry for Now' from corny territory." Consequence of Sound criticized the album for sounding like it was trying to "chase the trend of pop-EDM in an attempt to capitalize on its ubiquity" and sound "as if they were selected by committee", leading the album to sound like "a muddled mess of a record from a band that completely abandoned any sense of identity".

Newsday gave the album a B+ and praised the band's new direction, comparing it to the works of Coldplay and Owl City and concluding "One More Light shows how well Linkin Park has absorbed the current pop scene and applied it to their own music to genuinely reflect who they are today, not who some fans want them to be."

=== Band response ===
The band, specifically frontman Chester Bennington, lashed out in response to the negative reception of One More Light's material. As documented through Spin magazine, in an interview with Music Week, Bennington, at the accusations that the band had "sold out", suggested that those people should "stab [themselves] in the face" and "move the fuck on" from the band's past sound. Similarly, in a separate interview with Kerrang, Bennington, in response to claims of selling out with the album, said "If you're gonna be the person who says like 'they made a marketing decision to make this kind of record to make money' you can fucking meet me outside and I will punch you in your fucking mouth." In the same interview, Mike Shinoda also rejected the claims that they had made the album "for monetary reasons", responding, "that's not how I operate." Bennington explained that the accusation of "selling out" angered him because he saw it as a personal attack, concluding that "when you make it personal, like a personal attack against who we are as people, like, dude, shut up. That means that I can actually have feelings about it and most of the time my feelings are 'I want to kill you'."

In response to the comments, Slipknot and Stone Sour frontman Corey Taylor stated that he understood Bennington's frustrations, but advised him to "be fortunate for what you have, be fortunate for the fact that people are still coming to see you to hear the music. Give it a little time, you have to give it a little time." Bennington later responded that he agreed with Taylor's statements, saying:

I agree with him. I do appreciate our fans ... I'm human and sometimes take things too personally. Most of our fans have been very positive lately. Some ... not so much. Either way ... there is a lot of passion on both sides and I am grateful to all of our fans. Corey is a good dude and I appreciate him too ... Time to recalibrate my perspective. So I say to all of our fans ... Thank you and I love you all. Peace, love and happiness.

== Commercial performance ==
The album debuted at number one on the US Billboard 200, beating out Kendrick Lamar's Damn to the top spot by selling 111,000 copies in its first week with 100,000 of which coming from pure sales. This would gift the band its sixth number-one album on the Billboard 200 and the first since 2012's Living Things. The band is one of only a few bands to ever score six or more albums to peak at the top spot of the US Billboard charts. In its second week on the Billboard 200, One More Light fell from number one to number thirty after being ousted from the top spot by R&B singer Bryson Tiller's album True to Self.

One More Light debuted at number 4 in the United Kingdom, selling 16,100 copies in its first week. This would be the lowest-charting album by the band in the country since their debut Hybrid Theory, which also peaked at number 4.

Elsewhere, it debuted and peaked in Japan at number six (19,300 copies), number one in Canada (12,000 copies) and number two in Germany (20,000 copies). It was the world's best-selling album of the week ending on June 3, 2017.

== Track listing ==
One More Light track listing
No.	Title	Writer(s)	Producer(s)	Length
1.	"Nobody Can Save Me"	Mike Shinoda; Brad Delson; Jon Green	Mike Shinoda; Brad Delson; Jon Green^{[b]}; Andrew Bolooki^{[c]}	3:45
2.	"Good Goodbye" (featuring Pusha T and Stormzy)	Shinoda; Delson; Jesse Shatkin; Terrence Thornton; Michael Omari	Shinoda; Delson; Jesse Shatkin^{[b]}; Bolooki^{[c]}	3:31
3.	"Talking to Myself"	Shinoda; Delson; Ilsey Juber; JR Rotem	Shinoda; Delson; JR Rotem^{[a]}; Andrew Jackson^{[b]}; Bolooki^{[c]}	3:51
4.	"Battle Symphony"	Shinoda; Delson; Green	Shinoda; Delson; Bolooki^{[c]}	3:36
5.	"Invisible"	Shinoda; Justin Parker	Shinoda; Delson; Shatkin^{[a]}; Andrew Dawson^{[b]}; RAC^{[b]}; Emily Wright^{[c]}	3:34
6.	"Heavy" (featuring Kiiara)	Shinoda; Delson; Chester Bennington; Julia Michaels; Justin Tranter	Shinoda; Delson; Wright^{[c]}; Bolooki^{[c]}	2:49
7.	"Sorry for Now"	Shinoda	Shinoda; Delson; Musto^{[a]}; Goldstein^{[a]}; Michael Keenan^{[b]}; Bolooki^{[c]}	3:23
8.	"Halfway Right"	Shinoda; Delson; Bennington; Ross Golan	Shinoda; Delson; Keenan^{[b]}; Alexander Spit^{[b]}; Bolooki^{[c]}	3:37
9.	"One More Light"	Shinoda; Francis White	Shinoda; Delson; Wright^{[c]}	4:15
10.	"Sharp Edges"	Shinoda; Delson; Juber	Shinoda; Delson; RAC^{[b]}; Wright^{[c]}	2:58
Total length:				35:19

Notes

- ^{^a} signifies a co-producer
- ^{^b} signifies an additional producer
- ^{^c} signifies a vocal producer

== Personnel ==
Linkin Park

- Chester Bennington – vocals
- Rob Bourdon – drums
- Brad Delson – guitars
- Dave "Phoenix" Farrell – bass
- Joe Hahn – samples, programming
- Mike Shinoda – vocals, keyboards, programming

Additional musicians

- Kiiara – vocals (track 6)
- Pusha T – vocals (track 2)
- Stormzy – vocals (track 2)
- Ilsey Juber – backing vocals (tracks 3, 10)
- Ross Golan – backing vocals (track 8)
- Eg White – guitar and piano (track 9)
- Jon Green – additional guitar, backing vocals, and bass (track 1)
- Jesse Shatkin – additional keyboards and programming (track 5)
- Andrew Jackson – additional guitar (track 3)

Technical

- Alejandro Baima – assistant engineering
- Blackbear – co-production (track 7)
- Andrew Bolooki – vocal production (tracks 1–4, 6–8)
- Andrew Dawson – additional production (track 5)
- Brad Delson – production
- Lorenzo Errico – photography
- Robin Florent – assistant mixing engineering (tracks 2–4, 8–10)
- Chris Galland – mixing engineering (tracks 2–4, 8–10)
- Chris Gehringer – mastering
- Serban Ghenea – mixing (tracks 1, 5–7)
- Andrew Goldstein – co-producer (track 7)
- Jon Green – additional production (track 1)
- Joe Hahn – creative direction
- John Hanes – mixing engineering (tracks 1, 5–7)
- Andrew Jackson – additional production (track 3)
- Jeff Jackson – assistant mixing engineering (tracks 2–4, 8–10)
- Jerry Johnson – studio drum technician
- Tom Kahre – vocal engineering for Pusha T (track 2)
- Michael Keenan – additional production (tracks 7, 8)
- Peter J. Lee – art direction, creative direction, design, photography
- Frank Maddocks – art direction, creative direction, design, photography
- Manny Marroquin – mixing (tracks 2–4, 8–10)
- Ethan Mates – engineering
- Josh Newell – engineering
- RAC – additional production (tracks 5, 10)
- JR Rotem – co-production (track 3)
- Jesse Shatkin – additional production (track 2), co-production (track 5)
- Mike Shinoda – creative direction, engineering, photography, production
- Fraser T Smith – vocal engineering for Stormzy (track 2)
- Alexander Spit – additional production (track 8)
- Christian Tachiera – photography
- Warren Willis – studio assistant engineering
- Emily Wright – vocal production (tracks 5, 6, 9, 10)

== Charts ==
=== Weekly charts ===
Weekly chart performance for One More Light
Chart (2017–2018)	Peak position
Australian Albums (ARIA)	3
Austrian Albums (Ö3 Austria)	1
Belgian Albums (Ultratop Flanders)	1
Belgian Albums (Ultratop Wallonia)	3
Canadian Albums (Billboard)	1
Croatian International Albums (HDU)	4
Czech Albums (ČNS IFPI)	1
Danish Albums (Hitlisten)	6
Dutch Albums (Album Top 100)	5
Finnish Albums (Suomen virallinen lista)	2
French Albums (SNEP)	14
German Albums (Offizielle Top 100)	2
Greek Albums (IFPI Greece)	43
Hungarian Albums (MAHASZ)	1
Irish Albums (IRMA)	6
Italian Albums (FIMI)	4
Japan Hot Albums (Billboard Japan)	7
Japanese Albums (Oricon)	6
Latvian Albums (LaIPA)	34
Mexican Albums (Top 100 Mexico)	18
New Zealand Albums (RMNZ)	4
Norwegian Albums (VG-lista)	8
Polish Albums (ZPAV)	7
Portuguese Albums (AFP)	2
Scottish Albums (Official Charts)	5
Slovak Albums (ČNS IFPI)	2
South Korean Albums (Circle)	48
South Korean International Albums (Circle)	4
Spanish Albums (Promusicae)	6
Swedish Albums (Sverigetopplistan)	7
Swiss Albums (Romandie)	1
Swiss Albums (Schweizer Hitparade)	1
UK Albums (Official Charts)	4
US Billboard 200	1
US Top Alternative Albums (Billboard)	1
US Top Rock Albums (Billboard)	1
US Indie Store Album Sales (Billboard)	8

=== Year-end charts ===
Year-end chart performance for One More Light
Chart (2017)	Position
Australian Albums (ARIA)	59
Austrian Albums (Ö3 Austria)	30
Belgian Albums (Ultratop Flanders)	52
Belgian Albums (Ultratop Wallonia)	76
Dutch Albums (Album Top 100)	63
French Albums (SNEP)	152
German Albums (Offizielle Top 100)	23
Hungarian Albums (MAHASZ)	27
Italian Albums (FIMI)	40
Japan Hot Albums (Billboard Japan)	80
Japanese Albums (Oricon)	71
New Zealand Albums (RMNZ)	49
South Korean International Albums (Gaon)	52
Spanish Albums (PROMUSICAE)	96
Swiss Albums (Schweizer Hitparade)	22
UK Albums (OCC)	95
US Billboard 200	90
US Top Alternative Albums (Billboard)	5
US Top Rock Albums (Billboard)	7

Chart (2018)	Position
Hungarian Albums (MAHASZ)	92
Italian Albums (FIMI)	84

== Certifications ==
Certifications for One More Light
Region	Certification	Certified units/sales
Austria (IFPI Austria)	Gold	7,500^{‡}
Canada (Music Canada)	Platinum	80,000^{‡}
Denmark (IFPI Danmark)	Gold	10,000^{‡}
France (SNEP)	Gold	50,000^{‡}
Germany (BVMI)	Gold	100,000^{‡}
Hungary (MAHASZ)	Gold	1,000^{^}
Italy (FIMI)	Platinum	50,000^{‡}
New Zealand (RMNZ)	Gold	7,500^{‡}
Poland (ZPAV)	Gold	10,000^{‡}
United Kingdom (BPI)	Gold	100,000^{‡}
United States (RIAA)	Gold	500,000^{‡}
^{^} Shipments figures based on certification alone.^{‡} Sales+streaming figures based on certification alone.
