= Rob Bourdon =

American drummer (born 1979)

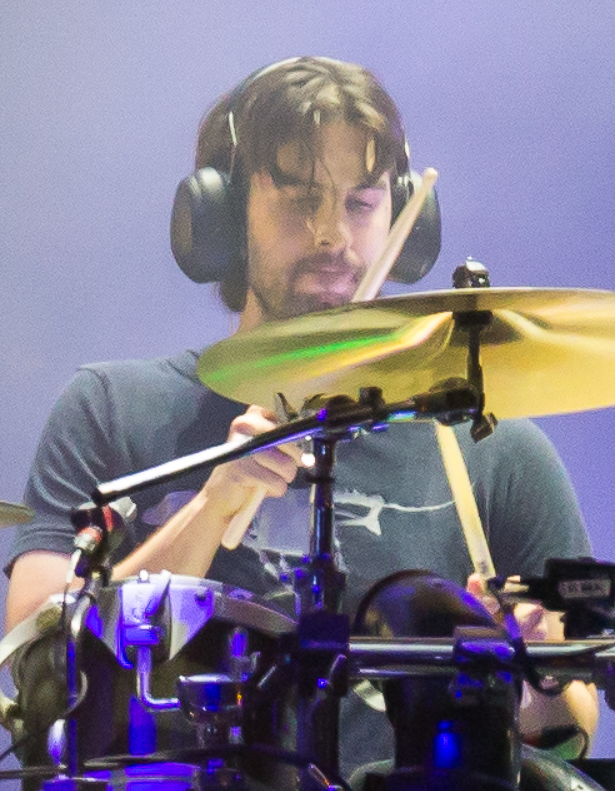
- Bourdon with Linkin Park at Rock'n'Heim 2015

Background information
- Born: Robert Gregory Bourdon; January 20, 1979 (age 47); Calabasas, California, U.S.
- Genres: Alternative rock; nu metal; alternative metal; electronic rock; pop rock
- Occupation: Musician
- Instruments: Drums; percussion
- Years active: 1996–2017
- Formerly of: Linkin Park; Relative Degree
- Website: linkinpark.com

Signature
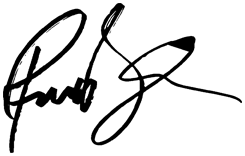

Robert Gregory Bourdon (born January 20, 1979) is an American musician, best known as a co-founding member and the former drummer of the rock band Linkin Park. He performed on the band's first seven albums until their hiatus in 2017, and was succeeded by Colin Brittain upon their reunion.

== Early life ==
Bourdon was born in Calabasas, California. He received classical piano lessons at a young age. He was inspired to play the drums after attending an Aerosmith concert, where he was personally introduced to drummer Joey Kramer. He also cites Tower of Power and Earth, Wind and Fire as his early influences. Bourdon attended Agoura High School in Agoura Hills where he met future bandmates Brad Delson and Mike Shinoda, in the high school's jazz band. Bourdon waited tables at a restaurant and worked as a party coordinator at a bowling alley prior to becoming a full-time musician. He attended Santa Monica College where he studied accounting.

== Career ==
Bourdon and Brad Delson formed their own band, Relative Degree. The band played a sell-out concert at the Roxy Theatre before breaking up.

Bourdon later joined Delson and Mike Shinoda to form Linkin Park, then known as Xero, in 1996. The band enjoyed mainstream success with their debut album, Hybrid Theory (2000), which would later go on to become 12× Platinum by the Recording Industry Association of America. Bourdon served as Linkin Park's drummer for seven studio albums and many international tours. Beyond drums and percussion, he also handled the band's business operations with Delson and bassist Dave Farrell.

Bourdon played the drums for ten hours a day for seven consecutive days, mainly practicing "Keys to the Kingdom", during the production of the band's sixth studio album, The Hunting Party. He injured his back, but later recovered.

He remained with Linkin Park through 2017, when the band went on hiatus following the death of vocalist Chester Bennington. Bourdon later informed the other members that he wished to distance himself from the band, and did not participate in re-release promotional activities or the 2024 compilation album Papercuts. Linkin Park announced their reformation on September 5, 2024, with new members, including Colin Brittain replacing Bourdon.

== Musical influences ==
Bourdon's musical influences include Led Zeppelin, Tower of Power, Aerosmith, The Police, Bad Religion, Steely Dan, System of a Down, Incubus, and Dave Matthews Band.

== Personal life ==
Bourdon resides in Los Angeles, and is Jewish.

== Discography ==
=== With Linkin Park ===
- Hybrid Theory (2000)
- Meteora (2003)
- Minutes to Midnight (2007)
- A Thousand Suns (2010)
- Living Things (2012)
- The Hunting Party (2014)
- One More Light (2017)
