= Brad Delson =

American guitarist

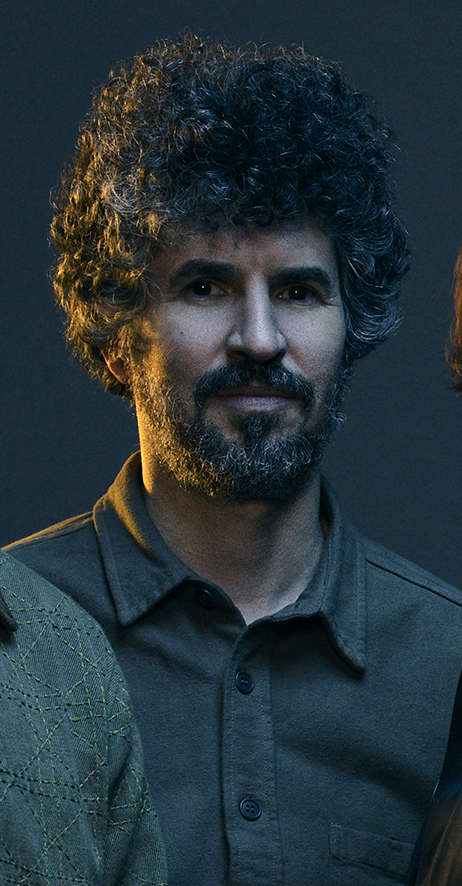
- Delson in 2024

Background information
- Born: Bradford Philip Delson; December 1, 1977 (age 48); Agoura, California, U.S.
- Genres: Alternative rock; nu metal; alternative metal; electronic rock; pop rock
- Occupation: Musician
- Instrument: Guitar
- Years active: 1995–present
- Member of: Linkin Park
- Formerly of: Relative Degree
- Website: linkinpark.com

Bradford Philip Delson (born December 1, 1977) is an American musician. He is the lead guitarist and one of the founding members of the rock band Linkin Park.

== Early life ==
Delson was born and raised in Agoura Hills, California. He attended Agoura High School with his friend, Mike Shinoda. Delson played the trumpet, and later began playing the guitar when he was 12 years old. He enjoyed listening to Guns N' Roses and Metallica. He played in the rock band Relative Degree with drummer Rob Bourdon, but the group disbanded after their first live show.

Delson attended UCLA, where he was roommates with bassist Dave Farrell for three years. He majored in communication studies, and later interned for Jeff Blue, then the vice president of A&R for Zomba Music. Blue shared his insight and experience on the music industry with Delson, while also giving him constructive feedback on musical projects. Delson graduated with a bachelor's degree in communication studies from UCLA in 1999. He considered attending law school after graduation but instead pursued a career as a professional musician.

== Music career ==
=== Linkin Park ===
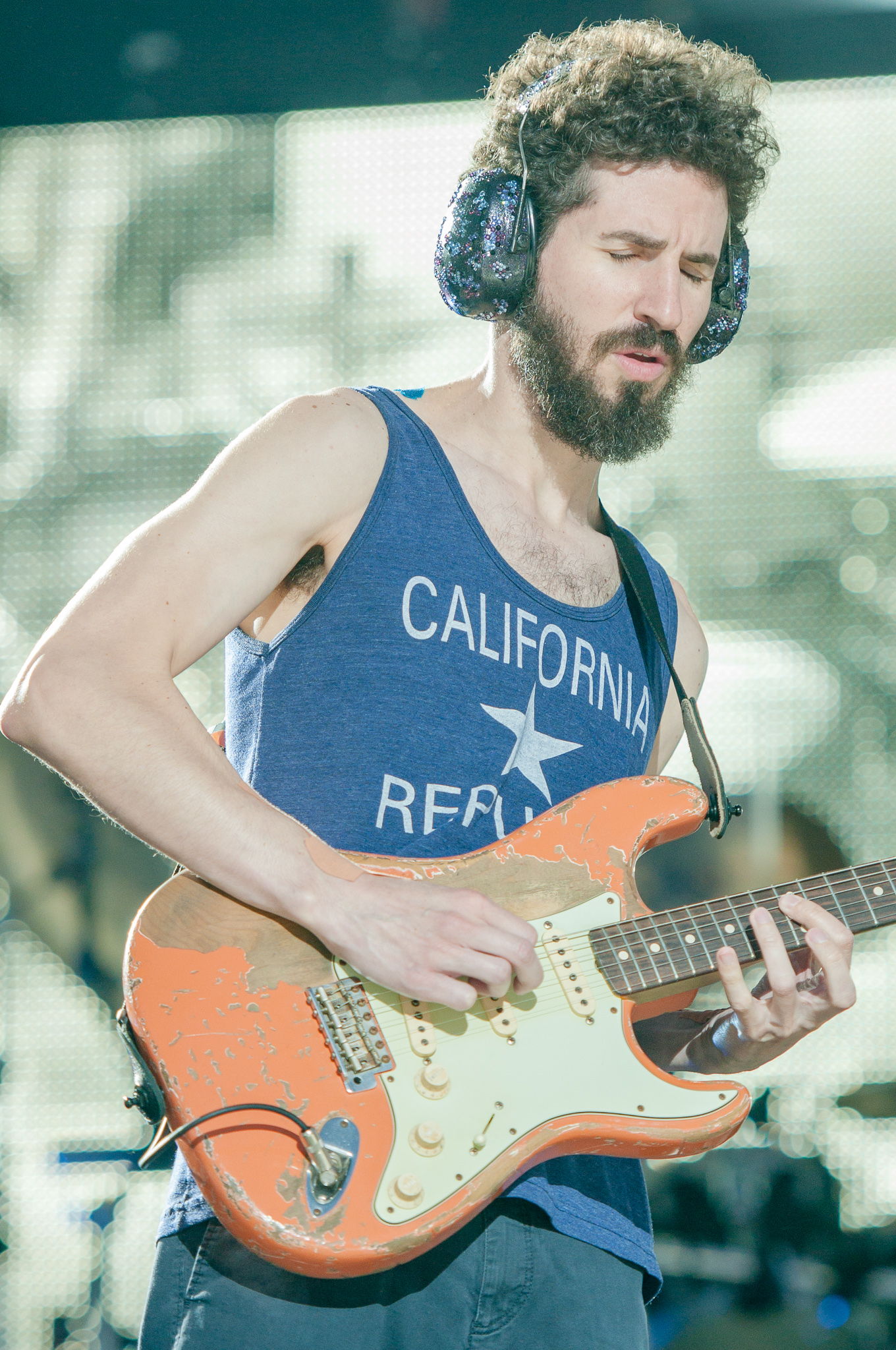
Delson performing with Linkin Park at Rock im Park in 2014

Delson, alongside Mike Shinoda and Rob Bourdon, founded Xero, the earliest incarnation of Linkin Park, in 1996. The band soon recruited vocalist Mark Wakefield, bassist Dave Farrell, and turntablist Joe Hahn. After Wakefield left Xero, Delson turned to his former boss Jeff Blue from Zomba Music to help find a replacement. Blue introduced the band to Chester Bennington, who successfully auditioned and became the band's full-time vocalist. Blue later became the vice president of A&R for Warner Bros. Records, and helped the band sign a record deal.

Delson played guitar on all eight of Linkin Park's albums. He also played bass on Hybrid Theory when Farrell temporarily left Linkin Park to tour with another band. After the release of Hybrid Theory, Delson was closely involved with the production and creative direction of Linkin Park's sound alongside Shinoda. The two co-produced The Hunting Party (2014) and One More Light (2017). While working on The Hunting Party, record producer Rick Rubin encouraged Delson to showcase his guitar playing by including more guitar solos compared to the band's previous albums. Delson commented on the new approach, "On the last few records I certainly played guitar in the studio, but I'd been focusing on other instruments… But these songs are all about rediscovering the guitar and having a lot of fun with it." He also oversaw the band's business operations, including their marketing and finance, alongside bandmates Farrell and Bourdon.

Delson and Linkin Park entered a seven-year hiatus following the sudden death of Chester Bennington in 2017. The band announced their reunion with new members in September 2024, and the band's eighth album, From Zero, was released in November, which Delson co-produced. Delson later revealed that he would not be joining the band on tour, preferring to work in the studio and behind the scenes. Alex Feder performs in his place, but Delson remains an official member of the band, and states that he has not ruled out a return to touring in the future.

=== Machine Shop Records ===
Delson and Shinoda founded their own record label, Machine Shop Records, in 2001. Delson explained his rationale behind founding his own record label, commenting, "Too many people in the music industry tried to preserve the status quo instead of embracing innovation."

== Discography ==
=== With Linkin Park ===
- Hybrid Theory (2000)
- Meteora (2003)
- Minutes to Midnight (2007)
- A Thousand Suns (2010)
- Living Things (2012)
- The Hunting Party (2014)
- One More Light (2017)
- From Zero (2024)

== Playing style and equipment ==
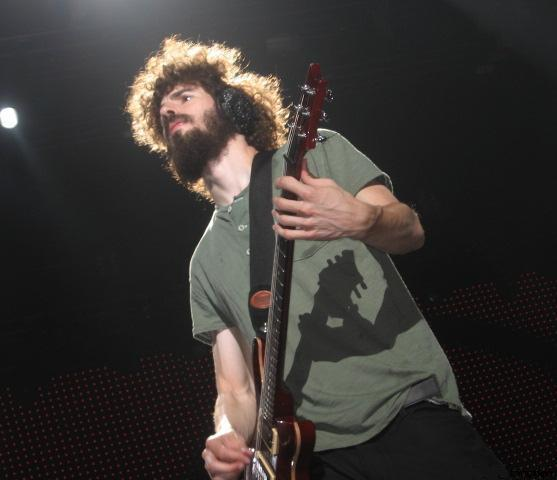
Delson performing at Smirnoff Music Centre in Dallas, Texas, on August 4, 2007

Delson has stated that he "doesn't like to show off", and that he attempts to play his guitar so that it sounds as though it were the keyboard or strings so as to seamlessly fit in with the band's hip-hop- and electronica-style compositions. Delson has also stated that he likes to produce a gritty, "sampled" feel with his sound. Although a self-described "fervent opponent of guitar leads," he started performing solos in the Minutes to Midnight era after his bandmates encouraged him to do so. Delson performs guitar solos on the tracks "What I've Done", "In Pieces", and "The Little Things Give You Away." Delson also played many solos on Linkin Park's 6th studio album, The Hunting Party.

Delson typically performs while wearing a pair of Shure brand headphones, in order to protect his hearing.

While composing music and starting song ideas, Delson will sometimes "freely improvise" guitar riffs and noise, and sort through the recordings at a later time. He said: "Something unintentional might be the coolest sound I make all day, and knowing how to allow those mistakes to happen and to shape them potentially makes for some great music. We’re trying to approach things with openness and childlike wonder."

Delson's equipment includes the following:

=== Guitars ===
- Paul Reed Smith Custom 24/Standard 24/CE 24 guitars – Delson's favorite guitar is his custom-made red PRS with the Hybrid Theory soldier on the body, tuned to Drop C#. He also has one with a greyburst finish and the "Minutes to Midnight-era LP" logo on it for tuning to Drop D and for performing songs from Minutes to Midnight. He also has a blue CE24 and sunburst Custom 24 that was his main guitar for the early days of Linkin Park and can be seen in the videos for "In The End," "Crawling," and "One Step Closer." It was retired in 2003. He also has two CE24s and a Custom 24 with a Fernandes Sustainer neck pickup for performing "No More Sorrow".
- PRS Custom 22/CE 22 guitars. Delson has two Custom 22, one in a grayish color tuned to E♭ tuning and one red, with the Hybrid Theory soldier on the body identical to his Custom 24 tuned to Drop C#. The same red guitar had its neck pickup changed out for a Fernandes Sustainer pickup for performing No More Sorrow.
- PRS NF3 – used on "Runaway" and "With You". tuned to B Standard
- PRS Standard – Silver finish. Used in E♭ tuning. Retired in 2002.
- Ibanez RG470XL guitar – used on "Don't Stay" and "Nobody's Listening", tuned to Drop B
- Ibanez GRG370DX guitar
- Ibanez RG120 guitar – Used on "A Place for My Head" during the Summer Sannitarium 2003 Tour and some Projekt Revolution shows in 2004 (one was smashed at nearly every show on Summer Sanitarium in 2003, and occasionally on Projekt Revolution in 2004).
- Ibanez RG7620 7-string guitar – Used on "Runaway" and "With You" from 1999 to 2002, tuned to B tuning
- Fender Rory Gallagher Tribute Stratocaster – Used on "What I've Done", "The Little Things Give You Away", "Valentine's Day", "Bleed it Out", "New Divide", "Iridescent", "Burning in the Skies" and "The Catalyst".
- Fender vintage 1950s Stratocaster – Use mainly in the studio or as a backup for his Fender Rory Gallagher Tribute Stratocaster. (During Summer Sonic 2009 he asked for one in the middle of New Divide as his Rory Gallagher had a problem)
- Fender Jaguar
- Fender Telecaster
- Gibson Les Paul (no longer used)
- Ibanez RGT3120 – used on "Runaway" and "With You" in 2003–2007, tuned to B
- Gibson J45 – Used on "The Messenger" (A Thousand Suns)

=== Effects ===
To avoid problems with pedals being damaged during live performances, Delson keeps his effect pedals in a rack along with his amplifiers and controls them through a pedalboard onstage. The board also contains a pedal control which allows him to change the settings for his effect pedals.

- Voodoo Lab Ground Control Pro floorboard
- GCX Audio Switcher
- TC Electronics G-Major effects processor
- Boss Expression pedal
- Boss BF-3 Flanger
- Boss NS-2 Noise Suppressor
- Boss CS-3 Compression Sustainer (x2)
- Boss CE-5 Chorus Ensemble
- Dunlop MXR Micro Amp
- Ibanez LF-7 Lo-fi pedal
- Caroline Guitar Company Kilobyte
- Dr. Scientist Reverberator
- Electro-Harmonix HOG
- EarthQuaker Devices Disaster Transport SR
- EarthQuaker Devices Hummingbird
- Electro-Harmonix Holy Grail
- Red Panda Particle
- Strymon BigSky
- Z.Vex Super Hard-On
- Z.Vex Mastotron

=== Amplifiers and current rig ===
For the first two albums, he used Mesa/Boogie Dual Rectifiers and modified Marshall 1959SLP reissue heads live and in the studio, but during the recording of Minutes to Midnight Delson decided not to use much of his old equipment to give him a new sound. Delson used several vintage and rare amplifiers such as Soldano SLOs, Marshall JCM 800, Mesa Boogie Dual Rectifier, a 1972 50-watt Hiwatt Custom, a Bogner Uberschall, and an extremely rare Bo Diddley amplifier with an onboard tape delay that was probably made for Diddley by Watkins (WEM). During live performances, Delson relies on several Randall MTS Modules to recreate the sound from these different amplifiers.

In 2014, the Randall rig was eventually phased out for a Fractal Axe-FX II setup, which is run direct into the PA system and a Matrix GT1000FX power amp. The only analog effect pedals being used are a Devi Ever Shoegazer fuzz, Electro-Harmonix H.O.G., and a Boss NS-2 Noise Suppressor.

=== Other ===
- Dunlop Picks-Tortex Wedge (0.73mm)
- D'Addario strings: EXL115, EXL140, EXL110
- DiMarzio pickups – D-Sonic, Tone Zone, and Air Norton
- Audio technica wireless transmitters and receivers
- Native Instruments Maschine Mikro - used on "Castle of Glass", "Lies Greed Misery", and "Victimized"
- Megaphone - used on "Empty Spaces" and "When They Come For Me"
- Mike Shinoda's Access Virus Ti2, Nord Stage 2, Korg Triton (from 2007-2009), & Open Labs Neko (from 2010 to 2014) for keyboards

== Personal life ==
Delson married Elisa Boren in September 2003. The couple bought a home in Los Angeles' Beverlywood neighborhood in 2022.

He was the keynote speaker at his alma mater UCLA's College of Letters and Science commencement ceremony on June 12, 2009, in Pauley Pavilion.

Delson is Jewish.

=== Philanthropy ===
In 2004, Delson and his wife established the Delson Scholarship Fund at UCLA, which annually awards four-year scholarships to extraordinary students from Huntington Park.

In 2005 He signed on as an official supporter of Little Kids Rock, a nonprofit organization that provides free musical instruments and instruction to children in underserved public schools throughout the United States. Delson has personally delivered instruments to children in the program and sits on the organization's board of directors as an honorary member.
