= Road to Revolution: Live at Milton Keynes =

Live album / video album by Linkin Park
- Released: November 21, 2008
- Recorded: June 29, 2008
- Venue: National Bowl (Milton Keynes)
- Genres: Nu metal; rap metal; alternative metal; rap rock; alternative rock
- Length: 77:28 (CD); 85:10 (DVD/Blu-ray)
- Labels: Warner Records; Machine Shop Records
- Director: Blue Leach at Examination Productions
- Producers: Emer Patten, Jordan Berliant (exec.), Ryan DeMarti (exec.), Wendy Griffiths (exec.), Rob McDermott (exec.), Devin Sarno (exec.), Peter Standish (exec.)

Linkin Park chronology
Minutes to Midnight (2007)	Road to Revolution: Live at Milton Keynes (2008)	Songs from the Underground (2008)

Linkin Park video chronology
Collision Course (2007)	Road to Revolution: Live at Milton Keynes (2008)

Road to Revolution: Live at Milton Keynes is the second live album and the fourth DVD by American rock band Linkin Park, released on November 21, 2008 through Warner Records. It was recorded during the band's annual Projekt Revolution festival tour at the National Bowl in Milton Keynes on June 29, 2008. It was originally planned to be released on November 25, 2008, but was changed to November 24. The concert featured material from all three of the band's albums, as well as songs from their EP, Collision Course with Jay-Z, and elements from Reanimation and Fort Minor's The Rising Tied.

In Italy, the album was certified gold by the Federation of the Italian Music Industry.

== Background ==
The concert was announced months beforehand and promoted heavily, possibly to gain as much of a crowd as possible for the release of a DVD/CD and to compete with the popular Glastonbury Festival which took place over the previous three days. The concert took place on June 29, 2008. It was the first time Projekt Revolution had come to the UK as part of the first Projekt Revolution in Europe (the other three shows took place in Germany). It was also the first time Linkin Park & Jay-Z collaborated outside of the US. Like all Projekt Revolution concerts several bands played before Linkin Park; Innerpartysystem, The Bravery, Enter Shikari, N*E*R*D, Pendulum and Jay-Z (who performed a full solo set, as well as his collaboration with the headliners). On many of the flyers released by the band, and distributed by the Linkin Park Street Team however, HIM were listed as performing. Bennington told the crowd that the show was the biggest Projekt Revolution show to date after "Points of Authority" and said that it was best day of his life. Earlier setlists indicated that "Reading My Eyes" was supposed to be played. "Dirt Off Your Shoulder/Lying from You" was also to be performed but was changed to the regular "Lying from You". Also "Bleed It Out" was originally planned to be after "In the End" to end the main set but was moved to the end of the setlist to end the show.

During "Jigga What/Faint" Shinoda mistakenly forgot to get his guitar in time, however his part was edited in. On the DVD, during the performance of "Bleed It Out", Bennington and Shinoda engage in a "singalong" with the crowd, however due to the length of the show, it was cut out of the CD. (CD's can only hold up to 80 minutes). "Wake" was also cut from the CD for the same reason, instead the ending fades from the end of "No More Sorrow" to "Given Up". 22 songs in total were played at the concert, "Somewhere I Belong", "Papercut" and "Points of Authority" (which featured verses from the Fort Minor songs "Petrified" and "There They Go") appear on the DVD as "bonus content" after the credits.

== Release ==
This concert was supposed to be broadcast on MTV but for legal reasons, the show ended up being commercially released on CD and DVD. The full show, like many other Linkin Park shows since 2007, was made available to download in MP3 format for those who purchased a code at the show. On October 6, 2008, the band's official website held a contest for anyone 18 years of age or older to submit a name for the CD/DVD. On October 8, five final choices were made into a poll allowing fans to vote for their favorite. The final choices were: "Linkin Park: Midnight In Milton Keynes", "Sunset Revolution: Linkin Park Live In The UK", "Road To Revolution: Linkin Park Live", "Revolution In The Iron City: Linkin Park Live", "Revolution in the UK: Linkin Park Live". On October 13, the website was modified to fit the winning title which was announced as "Road to Revolution", along with the track listing.

On October 23, 2008 the footage for "Leave Out All the Rest" premiered on Yahoo! Music. On October 28, 2008, an abbreviated version of the show was broadcast on WOWOW. "Lying from You", "Numb", "The Little Things Give You Away", "Numb/Encore" and "Jigga What/Faint" were not broadcast. On November 6, the official DVD trailer was posted on Linkin Park's YouTube channel (The before-release version). The trailer was also posted on the Warner Bros. Records YouTube channel (both pre and post release editions), and on Warner Music Spain's YouTube channel. Warner Music Hong Kong also produced a trailer of their own and posted it on their YouTube channel. The trailer was produced in English. Warner Music Mexico also produced their own trailer for the CD/DVD release. Unlike Hong Kong's trailer, it had graphics in Spanish. On November 7, the performance of "Breaking the Habit" premiered (though previously broadcast on WOWOW) on the band's official MySpace page. On November 18, the band began streaming the entire album on their MySpace page. "No More Sorrow" & "Given Up" are mixed up in track order on the stream and "Bleed It Out" is uploaded twice, one in the place of "Numb". On November 20, Linkin Park's official website announced the release date would be changed to November 24 and the footage for "Bleed It Out" (amended) premiered on their YouTube channel. The live performances for "Given Up" (amended), "Leave Out All the Rest", "Bleed It Out" (amended) and "Breaking the Habit" are available on the Linkin Park and Warner Bros. Records YouTube channels. On November 25, the footage for "Numb/Encore" & "Jigga What/Faint" premiered on their YouTube channel in one video. Though mistakenly, the footage for "Numb" was placed before "Numb/Encore" but was shortly removed afterwards and replaced with a fixed version. Given Up premiered on their YouTube page on December 2. Due to a feud between Warner Bros. Records and YouTube, Warner Bros. Records ordered YouTube to remove all videos and songs by artists signed by WBR. Because of this, all of the "Road to Revolution" performances were removed from the band's YouTube channel. The performance of "Leave Out All the Rest" appears as bonus footage on the "Twilight" special edition DVD. On December 2, 2009, it was announced the live version of "What I've Done" from the album is nominated for Best Hard Rock Performance at the 52nd annual Grammy Awards.

In July 2012, LPLive released a workprint of the show, showing the original complete show, it is a little different from the DVD, the songs that were performed with Jay-Z were dropped, there's a little extra to the workprint not seen or heard on the DVD.

=== iTunes ===
The live performances of "Given Up" (Amended version) and "Breaking the Habit" were made available for purchase on iTunes for $2.29 each. Unlike the previous live album Live in Texas, the whole concert footage is included as a bonus video, which can be obtained by purchasing a separate duplicate of the live explicit audio album.

== Reception ==
Professional ratings
Review scores
Source	Rating
AllMusic	3/5 stars
Artistdirect	4/5 stars
CHARTattack	2/5
Imperiumi	7/10 stars
Kerrang!	4/5 stars

Road to Revolution: Live at Milton Keynes received a divided reaction among critics, although most agreed that fans will be pleased with the album. Ryan Bird of Kerrang! highly praised the album, calling it the band's "most triumphant moment" as well as describing the concert as "a day of absolute perfection that spread across every last detail". Rick Florino of Artistdirect also praised the album, saying, "Road to Revolution is one of those rare live packages that works on every level." Stephen Thomas Erlewine of AllMusic gave a mixed review of the album, saying that it "will surely please fans", although he also stated that "It's not a bracing testament to the band's on-stage prowess." Kate Harper of CHARTattack gave a negative review, calling them "boring to watch", although she praised Jay-Z's appearance.

== Track listing ==
=== CD ===
No.	Title	Length
1.	"One Step Closer"	4:07
2.	"From the Inside"	3:25
3.	"No More Sorrow"	5:06
4.	"Given Up"	3:16
5.	"Lying from You"	3:19
6.	"Hands Held High" (A cappella)	1:27
7.	"Leave Out All the Rest"	3:24
8.	"Numb"	3:46
9.	"The Little Things Give You Away"	7:20
10.	"Breaking the Habit"	4:25
11.	"Shadow of the Day"	4:17
12.	"Crawling" (contains elements from "Krwlng")	4:58
13.	"In the End"	3:50
14.	"Pushing Me Away" (Piano Version)	3:18
15.	"What I've Done"	5:02
16.	"Numb/Encore" (with Jay-Z)	3:02
17.	"Jigga What/Faint" (with Jay-Z)	5:11
18.	"Bleed It Out"	8:15
19.	"Road to Revolution: Live at Milton Keynes (full concert)" (iTunes bonus video feature presentation, free with purchase of separate explicit album)	1:25:00
Total length:		77:28

=== DVD/Blu-ray ===
No.	Title	Length
1.	"One Step Closer"	4:13
2.	"From the Inside"	3:43
3.	"No More Sorrow"	5:45
4.	"Wake"	1:33
5.	"Given Up"	3:16
6.	"Lying from You"	3:18
7.	"Hands Held High" (A cappella)	1:26
8.	"Leave Out All the Rest"	3:23
9.	"Numb"	3:46
10.	"The Little Things Give You Away"	7:21
11.	"Breaking the Habit"	4:31
12.	"Shadow of the Day"	4:16
13.	"Crawling" (contains elements from "Krwlng")	4:57
14.	"In the End"	4:47
15.	"Pushing Me Away" (Piano Version)	4:56
16.	"What I've Done"	5:18
17.	"Numb/Encore" (with Jay-Z)	3:01
18.	"Jigga What/Faint" (with Jay-Z)	5:10
19.	"Bleed It Out"	11:28
Total length:		85:10

Hidden content
No.	Title	Length
20.	"Somewhere I Belong"	3:41
21.	"Papercut"	3:51
22.	"Points of Authority" (Contains verses from "Petrified" and "There They Go")	5:03

== Setlist ==
Original Set list

1. "One Step Closer"
2. "From the Inside"
3. "Somewhere I Belong"
4. "No More Sorrow"
5. "Papercut"
6. "Points of Authority"
7. "Wake 2.0" (interlude)
8. "Given Up"
9. "Lying from You"
10. "Hands Held High"
11. "Leave Out All the Rest"
12. "Numb"
13. "The Little Things Give You Away"
14. "Breaking the Habit"
15. "Shadow of the Day"
16. "Crawling"
17. "In the End"

First Encore

18. "Pushing Me Away" (piano version)
19. "What I've Done"

Second Encore

20. "Numb/Encore" (featuring Jay-Z)
21. "Jigga What/Faint" (featuring Jay-Z)
22. "Bleed It Out"

Original Planned Setlist

1. One Step Closer
2. From the Inside
3. Somewhere I Belong
4. No More Sorrow
5. Papercut
6. Points of Authority
7. Reading My Eyes
8. Wake 2.0 (interlude)
9. Given Up
10. Leave Out All the Rest
11. Numb
12. The Little Things Give You Away
13. Breaking the Habit
14. Shadow of the Day
15. Crawling
16. In the End
17. Bleed It Out

First Encore

18. Pushing Me Away (Piano Version)
19. What I've Done

Second Encore

20. Dirt Off Your Shoulder/Lying from You (featuring Jay-Z)
21. Numb/Encore (featuring Jay-Z)
22. Jigga What/Faint (featuring Jay-Z)

== Band line-up ==
=== Linkin Park ===
- Chester Bennington: lead vocals (except on "Hands Held High"); rhythm guitar (on "Shadow of the Day")
- Mike Shinoda: lead vocals, rhythm guitar, rapping, keyboard, backing vocals; acoustic guitar (on "The Little Things Give You Away")
- Brad Delson: lead guitar (except on "Hands Held High" and "Pushing Me Away")
- Dave "Phoenix" Farrell: bass guitar (except on "Hands Held High", "Leave Out All The Rest" and "Pushing Me Away"); additional vocals (on "The Little Things Give You Away"); rhythm guitar (on "Leave Out All The Rest")
- Joe Hahn: turntables, scratching, samples, programming
- Rob Bourdon: drums (except on "Hands Held High" and "Pushing Me Away")

=== Special Guest ===
- Jay-Z: additional rapping (on "Numb/Encore" and "Jigga What/Faint")

== Release history ==
Country	Release date
Europe	November 21, 2008
United Kingdom	November 24, 2008
Worldwide	November 24, 2008
Australia	December 1, 2008
New Zealand	December 1, 2008

== Charts ==
Chart (2008)	Peak position
Australian Albums (ARIA)	24
Austrian Albums (Ö3 Austria)	14
Belgian Albums (Ultratop Flanders)	47
Belgian Albums (Ultratop Wallonia)	28
Czech Albums (ČNS IFPI)	12
Danish Albums (Hitlisten)	38
Dutch Albums (Album Top 100)	54
French Albums (SNEP)	12
German Albums (Offizielle Top 100)	11
Greek Albums (IFPI Greece)	2
Irish Albums (IRMA)	81
Italian Albums (FIMI)	17
Japanese Albums (Oricon)	6
Mexican Albums (Top 100 Mexico)	60
New Zealand Albums (RMNZ)	17
Norwegian Albums (VG-lista)	15
Portuguese Albums (AFP)	2
Scottish Albums (Official Charts)	64
Spanish Albums (Promusicae)	17
Swedish Albums (Sverigetopplistan)	54
Swiss Albums (Schweizer Hitparade)	16
UK Albums (Official Charts)	58
UK Rock & Metal Albums (Official Charts)	4
US Billboard 200	41
US Top Alternative Albums (Billboard)	8
US Top Rock Albums (Billboard)	12
US Top Hard Rock Albums (Billboard)	6

Chart (2017)	Peak position
Hungarian Albums (MAHASZ)	39
Swedish Music DVD (Sverigetopplistan)	10

== Certifications and sales ==
Region	Certification	Certified units/sales
Australia (ARIA)	Gold	35,000^{^}
Germany (BVMI)	Platinum	200,000^{^}
Italy sales in 2008	—	40,000
Italy (FIMI) sales since 2009	Gold	30,000^{*}
New Zealand (RMNZ)	Gold	7,500^{^}
Portugal (AFP)	Platinum	20,000^{^}
Switzerland (IFPI Switzerland)	Gold	15,000^{^}
United Kingdom (BPI)	Silver	60,000^{^}
^{*} Sales figures based on certification alone.^{^} Shipments figures based on certification alone.
