= Live 8 concert, Philadelphia =

2005 concert in Pennsylvania, US

Coordinates: 39.964°N 75.180°W

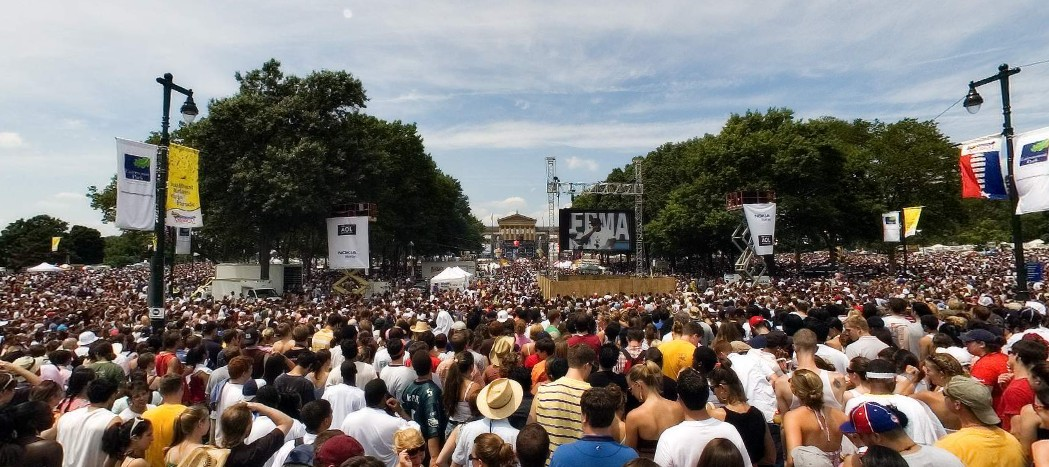
View of Live 8 crowd along the Benjamin Franklin Parkway

On 2 July 2005, a Live 8 concert was held in Philadelphia, Pennsylvania, United States, in front of the Philadelphia Museum of Art, with a densely packed audience stretched out for one mile along the Benjamin Franklin Parkway. The event was organized by the ONE Campaign.

It was one of the first Live 8 concerts announced, as the city had played host to its Live Aid predecessor in 1985, and, until the inclusion of a concert outside Toronto, was the only city in North America to represent Live 8. It did, however, remain the only United States city to participate in the event.

The event is also referred to as "Live 8 Philadelphia", "Live 8 Philly", or "Live 8 USA".

Unlike other venues, no tickets were issued to control access, and Philadelphia police declined to give a crowd estimate. Presenters stated several times on stage that over one million people were at the concert. Non-organizer estimates ranged from 600,000 to 800,000 and one million to 1.5 million. Some estimates were based on the number of people at the concert at any one time, while other estimates were based on the total number of people on the Parkway over the course of the nearly eight hour-long event.

== Lineup ==
All times EDT

Name	Role	Title	Time
Kaiser Chiefs		"I Predict a Riot", "Everyday I Love You Less and Less", "Oh My God"	11:49
Will Smith	Host		12:05
The Black Eyed Peas		"Where Is the Love?", "Let's Get It Started", "Don't Phunk with My Heart", "Get Up, Stand Up" (with Rita Marley and Stephen Marley)	12:25
Don Cheadle	presenter		12:50
Bon Jovi		"Livin' on a Prayer", "Have a Nice Day", "It's My Life"	12:54
Chris Tucker	presenter		13:10
Destiny's Child		"Survivor", "Say My Name", "Girl" /"I'll Take You There"	13:14
Don Cheadle	presenter		13:29
Kanye West		"Diamonds (From Sierra Leone)", "All Falls Down", "Jesus Walks"	13:33
Jimmy Smits	presenter		13:43
Will Smith and DJ Jazzy Jeff		"Gettin' Jiggy Wit It", "Switch", "The Fresh Prince of Bel-Air", "Summertime"	13:47
Dhani Jones with four other Philadelphia Eagles players	presenters		14:07
Toby Keith		"Beer for My Horses", "Whiskey Girl", "Stays in Mexico"	14:11
Natalie Portman	presenter		14:25
Dave Matthews Band		"Don't Drink the Water", "Dreamgirl", "American Baby", "Anyone Seen the Bridge?", "Too Much"	14:29
Alicia Keys		"For All We Know"	15:07
Black Ice		"Young Girls" (poem)	15:37
Jennifer Connelly	presenter		15:41
Linkin Park		"Crawling", "Somewhere I Belong", "Breaking the Habit", "In the End"	15:45
Linkin Park & Jay-Z		"Public Service Announcement - Intro", "Dirt off Your Shoulder/Lying from You", "Big Pimpin'/Papercut", "Jigga What/Faint", "Numb/Encore"	16:01
DJ Green Lantern	DJ set		16:21
Def Leppard		"Pour Some Sugar on Me", No Matter What", "Rock of Ages"	16:28
Kami	presenter		16:44
Jars of Clay		"Show You Love", "Flood"	16:48
Lemon	poem		16:59
Sarah McLachlan		"Fallen", "World on Fire", "Angel" (with Josh Groban)	17:01
Chris Tucker	presenter		17:18
Maroon 5		"Harder to Breathe", "This Love", "She Will Be Loved", "Rockin' in the Free World"	17:22
Naomi Watts	presenter		18:10
Keith Urban		"Days Go By", "You'll Think of Me", "Another Day in Paradise", "Somebody Like You"	18:14
Jimmy Smits	presenter		19:23
Rob Thomas		"...Something to Be", "Lonely No More", "3 A.M."/"The Joker", "This Is How a Heart Breaks"	19:27
Richard Gere	presenter		21:00
Stevie Wonder		"Master Blaster (Jammin')", "Higher Ground" (with Rob Thomas), "A Time to Love", "Shelter in the Rain", "Signed, Sealed, Delivered I'm Yours" (with Adam Levine), "So What the Fuss", "Superstition"	21:04

== Performance notes ==
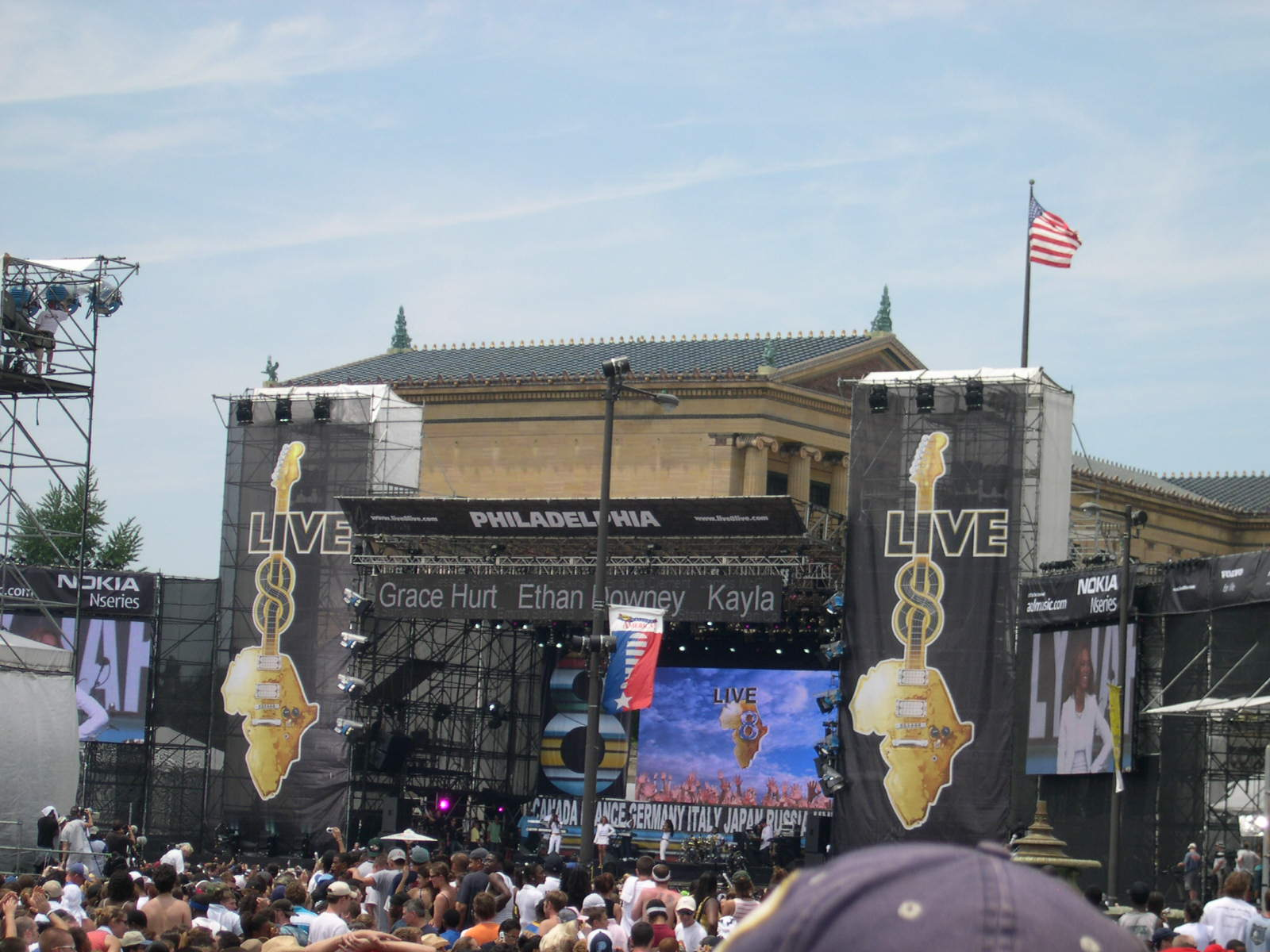
Destiny's Child at Live 8

Several artists mentioned or dedicated performances to Luther Vandross who had died the day before.

Two days after the concert, Elton John gave a free concert on the same stage used for Live 8, as part of the city's Independence Day celebrations.

== Pre-show news and rumours ==
Live 8 producer/promoter Russell Simmons was the man responsible for adding more African-American artists to the Live 8 Philadelphia bill, including some Def Poetry Jam poets.

After noticing the lack of hip-hop artists on the bill, Bono called Jay-Z and Mike Shinoda of Linkin Park personally and asked them to perform in Philadelphia. 50 Cent, Justin Timberlake, Usher, and Sean Combs were also originally scheduled to perform but cancelled due to scheduling conflicts.

Despite suspicions that the show's finale would consist of a new rendition of the USA for Africa hit "We Are the World", which was performed at the Philadelphia show 20 years earlier at Live Aid, this did not happen.

Also, rumors circulated in the crowd that Bruce Springsteen would close the show. He did not.

== Coverage ==
In the United States, MTV and VH1 provided intermittent and incomplete live and taped coverage, frequently breaking away mid-song for commercials or commentary by their veejays. ABC provided a short highlights program that evening.

In the United Kingdom, BBC One aired highlights after the full coverage of the London show. Furthermore, BBC Three aired further highlights the following evening. Clair Brothers Audio Systems and Franklin Simon Productions were responsible for providing the live sound reinforcement for Live 8 Philadelphia. Electric Factory Concerts was also involved in the production. Clair Brothers also provided the live sound reinforcement for Live 8 London. The remaining venues were handled by local sound reinforcement companies.

AOL also provided a webcast of the entire show as it happened and carried webcasts of almost all of the Live 8 shows.
