= List of Billboard Modern Rock Tracks number ones of the 2000s =

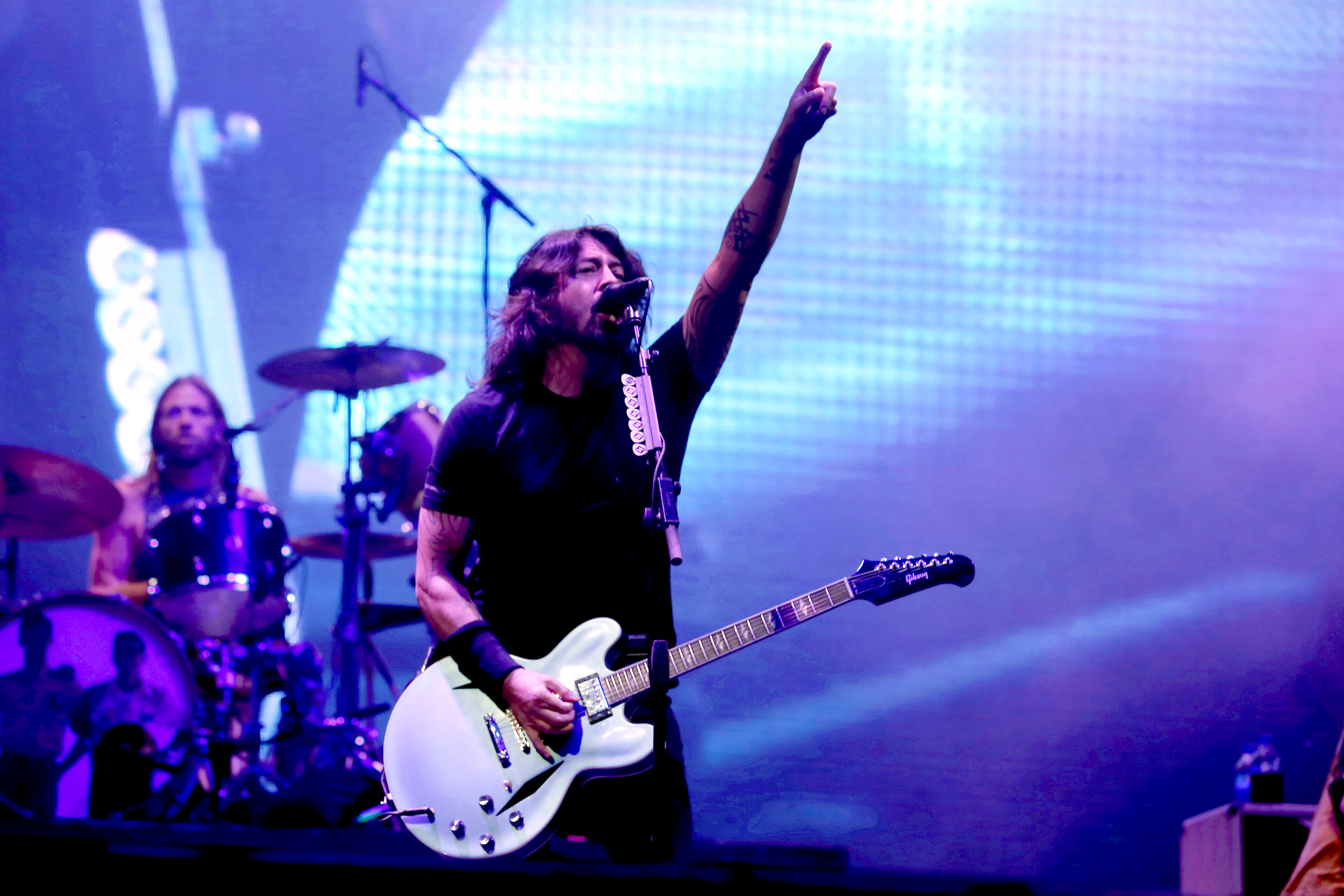
"The Pretender" by American rock band Foo Fighters spent the most weeks at number one on the Alternative Songs chart for any song during the 2000s.

Alternative Airplay is a record chart published by the music industry magazine Billboard that ranks the most-played songs on American modern rock radio stations. It was introduced by Billboard in September 1988. During the 2000s, the chart was based on electronically monitored airplay data compiled by Nielsen Broadcast Data Systems from a panel of national rock radio stations, with songs being ranked by their total number of spins per week. The chart was known as Modern Rock Tracks until June 2009, when it was renamed Alternative Songs in order to "better [reflect] the descriptor used among those in the [modern rock radio] format."

106 songs topped the chart in the 2000s; the first was "All the Small Things" by Blink-182, while the last was "Uprising" by Muse. "The Pretender" by Foo Fighters spent eighteen weeks atop the chart in 2007—the most for any song during the decade—and broke the previous all-time record for most weeks at number one set by "Scar Tissue" by Red Hot Chili Peppers in 1999 and later tied by "It's Been Awhile" by Staind in 2001 and "Boulevard of Broken Dreams" by Green Day in 2005.

The top song of the 2000s on Billboard's Alternative Songs decade-end list was "Headstrong" by Trapt, which topped the chart for five weeks and was also its year-end number-one song for 2003. The decade-end top Alternative Songs artist was Linkin Park, who scored eight number-one songs—"In the End", "Somewhere I Belong", "Faint", "Numb", "Lying from You", "Breaking the Habit", "What I've Done" and "New Divide"—and spent a record sixty-two weeks atop the chart during the 2000s.

== Number-one songs ==
Key
† – Billboard year-end number-one song
‡ – Billboard decade-end number-one song
↑ – Return of a song to number one

Song	Artist	Reached number one	Weeks at number one
"All the Small Things"	Blink-182	December 25, 1999	8
"Otherside"	Red Hot Chili Peppers	February 19, 2000	13
"Kryptonite" †	3 Doors Down	May 20, 2000	11
"Last Resort"	Papa Roach	August 5, 2000	1
"Californication"	Red Hot Chili Peppers	August 12, 2000	1
"Last Resort" ↑	Papa Roach	August 19, 2000	6
"Minority"	Green Day	September 30, 2000	5
"Hemorrhage (In My Hands)"	Fuel	November 4, 2000	12
"Hanging by a Moment"	Lifehouse	January 27, 2001	3
"Butterfly"	Crazy Town	February 17, 2001	2
"Drive" †	Incubus	March 3, 2001	8
"It's Been Awhile"	Staind	April 28, 2001	16
"Fat Lip"	Sum 41	August 18, 2001	1
"Smooth Criminal"	Alien Ant Farm	August 25, 2001	4
"How You Remind Me"	Nickelback	September 22, 2001	13
"In the End"	Linkin Park	December 22, 2001	5
"Blurry" †	Puddle of Mudd	January 26, 2002	9
"Youth of the Nation"	P.O.D.	March 30, 2002	2
"The Middle"	Jimmy Eat World	April 13, 2002	4
"Seein' Red"	Unwritten Law	May 11, 2002	4
"Hero"	Chad Kroeger featuring Josey Scott	June 8, 2002	3
"By the Way"	Red Hot Chili Peppers	June 29, 2002	14
"Aerials"	System of a Down	October 5, 2002	3
"You Know You're Right"	Nirvana	October 26, 2002	4
"All My Life"	Foo Fighters	November 23, 2002	10
"Always"	Saliva	February 1, 2003	1
"No One Knows"	Queens of the Stone Age	February 8, 2003	4
"Can't Stop"	Red Hot Chili Peppers	March 8, 2003	3
"Bring Me to Life"	Evanescence	March 29, 2003	2
"Somewhere I Belong"	Linkin Park	April 12, 2003	5
"Like a Stone"	Audioslave	May 17, 2003	2
"Headstrong" † ‡	Trapt	May 31, 2003	5
"Send the Pain Below"	Chevelle	July 5, 2003	1
"Seven Nation Army"	The White Stripes	July 12, 2003	3
"Just Because"	Jane's Addiction	August 2, 2003	1
"Faint"	Linkin Park	August 9, 2003	6
"So Far Away"	Staind	September 20, 2003	6
"Weak and Powerless"	A Perfect Circle	November 1, 2003	2
"So Far Away" ↑	Staind	November 15, 2003	1
"Numb"	Linkin Park	November 22, 2003	12
"Hit That"	The Offspring	February 14, 2004	1
"Megalomaniac" †	Incubus	February 21, 2004	6
"I Miss You"	Blink-182	April 3, 2004	2
"The Reason"	Hoobastank	April 17, 2004	1
"Last Train Home"	Lostprophets	April 24, 2004	1
"Love Song"	311	May 1, 2004	1
"Cold Hard Bitch"	Jet	May 8, 2004	3
"Lying from You"	Linkin Park	May 29, 2004	3
"Ch-Check It Out"	Beastie Boys	June 19, 2004	2
"Slither"	Velvet Revolver	July 3, 2004	4
"Float On"	Modest Mouse	July 31, 2004	1
"Just Like You"	Three Days Grace	August 7, 2004	3
"Breaking the Habit"	Linkin Park	August 28, 2004	4
"American Idiot"	Green Day	September 25, 2004	6
"Vertigo"	U2	November 6, 2004	4
"Pain"	Jimmy Eat World	December 4, 2004	1
"Boulevard of Broken Dreams"	Green Day	December 11, 2004	16
"E-Pro"	Beck	April 2, 2005	1
"Be Yourself"	Audioslave	April 9, 2005	4
"Holiday"	Green Day	May 7, 2005	3
"The Hand That Feeds"	Nine Inch Nails	May 28, 2005	5
"Beverly Hills"	Weezer	July 2, 2005	1
"Best of You" †	Foo Fighters	July 9, 2005	7
"Feel Good Inc."	Gorillaz	August 27, 2005	8
"Only"	Nine Inch Nails	October 22, 2005	5
"DOA"	Foo Fighters	November 26, 2005	2
"Only" ↑	Nine Inch Nails	December 10, 2005	2
"DOA" ↑	Foo Fighters	December 24, 2005	4
"Hypnotize"	System of a Down	January 21, 2006	1
"Perfect Situation"	Weezer	January 28, 2006	4
"Wasteland"	10 Years	February 25, 2006	1
"Every Day Is Exactly the Same"	Nine Inch Nails	March 4, 2006	4
"World Wide Suicide"	Pearl Jam	April 1, 2006	3
"Dani California" †	Red Hot Chili Peppers	April 22, 2006	14
"Steady, As She Goes"	The Raconteurs	July 29, 2006	1
"Miss Murder"	AFI	August 5, 2006	5
"Animal I Have Become"	Three Days Grace	September 9, 2006	2
"Tell Me Baby"	Red Hot Chili Peppers	September 23, 2006	4
"When You Were Young"	The Killers	October 21, 2006	2
"Welcome to the Black Parade"	My Chemical Romance	November 4, 2006	7
"Anna Molly"	Incubus	December 23, 2006	5
"Snow (Hey Oh)"	Red Hot Chili Peppers	January 27, 2007	5
"Pain"	Three Days Grace	March 3, 2007	4
"From Yesterday"	Thirty Seconds to Mars	March 31, 2007	2
"Survivalism"	Nine Inch Nails	April 14, 2007	1
"What I've Done" †	Linkin Park	April 21, 2007	15
"Icky Thump"	The White Stripes	August 4, 2007	3
"Paralyzer"	Finger Eleven	August 25, 2007	1
"The Pretender"	Foo Fighters	September 1, 2007	18
"Fake It"	Seether	January 5, 2008	8
"Long Road to Ruin"	Foo Fighters	March 1, 2008	7
"Psycho"	Puddle of Mudd	April 19, 2008	2
"Rise Above This"	Seether	May 3, 2008	2
"Pork and Beans"	Weezer	May 17, 2008	11
"Let It Die" †	Foo Fighters	August 2, 2008	4
"Viva la Vida"	Coldplay	August 30, 2008	2
"Believe"	Staind	September 13, 2008	3
"You're Gonna Go Far, Kid"	The Offspring	October 4, 2008	11
"Sex on Fire"	Kings of Leon	December 20, 2008	8
"Second Chance"	Shinedown	February 14, 2009	1
"Love Hurts"	Incubus	February 21, 2009	1
"Second Chance" ↑	Shinedown	February 28, 2009	2
"Love Hurts" ↑	Incubus	March 14, 2009	2
"Brother"	Pearl Jam	March 28, 2009	2
"Use Somebody" †	Kings of Leon	April 11, 2009	3
"Feel Good Drag"	Anberlin	May 2, 2009	1
"Know Your Enemy"	Green Day	May 9, 2009	6
"New Divide"	Linkin Park	June 20, 2009	1
"Panic Switch"	Silversun Pickups	June 27, 2009	1
"New Divide" ↑	Linkin Park	July 4, 2009	11
"Notion"	Kings of Leon	September 19, 2009	1
"Uprising"	Muse	September 26, 2009	2
"Check My Brain"	Alice in Chains	October 10, 2009	1
"Uprising" ↑	Muse	October 17, 2009	15

== Bibliography ==
- Whitburn, Joel (2008). Rock Tracks 1981–2008 (3rd ed.). Record Research. ISBN 978-0-8982-0174-1.
