= Live in Texas (Linkin Park album) =

2003 live/video album by Linkin Park

Live album / video album by Linkin Park
- Released: November 18, 2003
- Recorded: August 2–3, 2003
- Venues: Reliant Stadium (Houston, Texas); Texas Stadium (Irving, Texas)
- Genres: Nu metal; rap metal; rap rock; alternative rock
- Length: 41:40 (CD); 70:58 (DVD)
- Label: Warner Bros.
- Producers: Matt Caltabiano; Josh Abraham; David May

Linkin Park chronology
Meteora (2003)	Live in Texas (2003)	Collision Course (2004)

Linkin Park video chronology
Frat Party at the Pankake Festival (2001)	Live in Texas (2003)	Collision Course (2004)

Live in Texas is the debut live album and the second DVD by American rock band Linkin Park, released on November 18, 2003, through Warner Records. The band's main setlist includes songs from their studio albums Hybrid Theory and Meteora, as well as one song from their remix album Reanimation. The live album peaked at #23 on the Billboard 200, and it has sold 1.1 million copies in the United States. The audio version of the concert includes 12 out of the 17 tracks.

== Background ==
The DVD comes with a bonus CD that features twelve of the songs from the DVD. The other five live tracks can be found on the LP Underground 3.0 CD. The audio on the CD is mixed differently from the audio on the DVD. The DVD/CD comes in two versions: a CD case and, although harder to find, a DVD case. Live in Texas was awarded Gold certification in 2003 by the RIAA, only 29 days after the release of album, and Platinum certification in 2007.

The concert footage was shot on August 2 and August 3 during the Summer Sanitarium Tour 2003 at Reliant Stadium in Houston, Texas, and Texas Stadium in Irving, Texas. The video footage is made up of the audio from the Dallas show and video from both the Houston and Dallas shows; because of this the band had to wear the same clothes on two shows.

Lars Ulrich also makes a quick, surprise appearance dressed up as a Hulk-fisted bunny man during "From the Inside".

The audio versions of "From the Inside" and "Runaway" were released as the b-sides of the "From the Inside" single. When "Lying from You" was released as a single, the footage from Live in Texas was used as the song's music video with the studio version dubbed over.

== Reception ==
Professional ratings
Review scores
Source	Rating
AllMusic	2.5/5 stars
Imperiumi	6/10 stars
Scream Magazine	2/6 stars

Johnny Loftus of AllMusic gave the album a mixed review, saying "their cool professionalism makes Live in Texas sound somewhat sterile," as well as saying the band "seems lost inside its own sound." Nevertheless, he also says that the album "will likely serve as a memento of the tour".

== Track listing ==
=== CD ===
No.	Title	Writer(s)	Length
1.	"Somewhere I Belong"	Chester Bennington; Rob Bourdon; Brad Delson; Dave Farrell; Joe Hahn; Mike Shinoda	3:37
2.	"Lying from You"	Bennington; Bourdon; Delson; Farrell; Hahn; Shinoda	3:07
3.	"Papercut"	Bennington; Bourdon; Delson; Hahn; Shinoda	3:06
4.	"Points of Authority"	Bennington; Bourdon; Delson; Hahn; Shinoda	3:25
5.	"Runaway"	Bennington; Bourdon; Delson; Hahn; Shinoda; Mark Wakefield	3:06
6.	"Faint"	Bennington; Bourdon; Delson; Farrell; Hahn; Shinoda	2:47
7.	"From the Inside"	Bennington; Bourdon; Delson; Farrell; Hahn; Shinoda	3:00
8.	"P5hng Me A*wy"	Bennington; Bourdon; Delson; Hahn; Shinoda	5:05
9.	"Numb"	Bennington; Bourdon; Delson; Farrell; Hahn; Shinoda	3:06
10.	"Crawling"	Bennington; Bourdon; Delson; Hahn; Shinoda	3:33
11.	"In the End"	Bennington; Bourdon; Delson; Hahn; Shinoda	3:31
12.	"One Step Closer" (contains breakdown from "1stp Klosr")	Bennington; Bourdon; Delson; Hahn; Shinoda	4:13
Total length:			42:17

==== Enhanced CD Extras ====
- Website toolkit
- Merchandise
- Screensaver
- Web links

=== DVD ===
No.	Title	Writer(s)	Length
1.	"Don't Stay"	Chester Bennington; Rob Bourdon; Brad Delson; Dave Farrell; Joe Hahn; Mike Shinoda	4:34
2.	"Somewhere I Belong"	Bennington; Bourdon; Delson; Farrell; Hahn; Shinoda	3:36
3.	"Lying from You"	Bennington; Bourdon; Delson; Farrell; Hahn; Shinoda	3:36
4.	"Papercut"	Bennington; Bourdon; Delson; Hahn; Shinoda	3:08
5.	"Points of Authority"	Bennington; Bourdon; Delson; Hahn; Shinoda	3:27
6.	"Runaway"	Bennington; Bourdon; Delson; Hahn; Shinoda; Mark Wakefield	3:10
7.	"Faint"	Bennington; Bourdon; Delson; Farrell; Hahn; Shinoda	2:50
8.	"From the Inside"	Bennington; Bourdon; Delson; Farrell; Hahn; Shinoda	3:02
9.	"Figure.09"	Bennington; Bourdon; Delson; Farrell; Hahn; Shinoda	3:18
10.	"With You"	Bennington; Bourdon; Delson; Hahn; Shinoda; Dust Brothers	3:21
11.	"By Myself"	Bennington; Bourdon; Delson; Hahn; Shinoda	5:23
12.	"P5hng Me A*wy"	Bennington; Bourdon; Delson; Hahn; Shinoda	6:02
13.	"Numb"	Bennington; Bourdon; Delson; Farrell; Hahn; Shinoda	3:17
14.	"Crawling"	Bennington; Bourdon; Delson; Hahn; Shinoda	3:41
15.	"In the End"	Bennington; Bourdon; Delson; Hahn; Shinoda	3:54
16.	"A Place for My Head"	Bennington; Bourdon; Delson; Farrell; Hahn; Shinoda; Wakefield	4:32
17.	"One Step Closer" (contains breakdown from "1stp Klosr")	Bennington; Bourdon; Delson; Hahn; Shinoda	3:49
Total length:			70:58

== Personnel ==
Linkin Park

- Chester Bennington – vocals
- Rob Bourdon – drums
- Brad Delson – lead guitar
- Joe Hahn – turntables, sampling, programming
- Dave "Phoenix" Farrell – bass
- Mike Shinoda – vocals; rhythm guitar ("Somewhere I Belong", "Faint", "From the Inside", "P5hng Me A*wy", "Crawling"), keyboard, sampling ("Numb")

CD production

- Produced and mixed by: Josh Abraham
- Engineered by: Ryan Williams
- Pro Tools engineer: Brandon Belsky
- Mixed at Pulse Recordings, Los Angeles, California

DVD production

- Director: Kimo Proudfoot
- DVD producer: Matt Caltabiano
- Director of photography: Jim Hawkinson
- Edited by: Kevin McCullough

Production team

- Worldwide representation: Rob McDermott for The Firm
- Additional representation by: Ryan Saullo and Ryan DeMarti
- Booking agent: Mike Arfin for Artist Group International
- Legal: Danny Hayes for Davis, Shapiro, Lewit, Montone & Hayes
- Business manager: Michael Oppenheim and Jonathan Schwartz for Gudvi, Sussman and Oppenheim
- Worldwide licensing and merchandising: Bandmerch
- Creative direction: Mike Shinoda and the Flem
- Art direction and design: The Flem
- Digipak design: The Flem
- Booklet design: Lawrence Azerrad Design
- Digipak photography: Gret Watermann
- Recorded live August 2, 2003 at Reliant Stadium in Houston, TX and August 3, 2003, at Texas Stadium in Irving, TX on Metallica's Summer Sanitarium Tour
- Mobile audio recording:
  - Live recording engineer: Joel Singer with Effanel Music
  - Assistant recording engineer: Hardi Kamsani with Effanel Music
- Mobile recording equipment provided by: Effanel Music
- DVD producer: David May
- DVD mastered by: Gateway Mastering
- DVD production director: Penny Marciano
- DVD graphics coordinator: Raena Winscott
- DVD graphics design: Sean Donnelly and Kimo Proudfoot
- Authoring: Wamo

== Charts ==
=== Weekly charts ===
2003–2005 weekly chart performance for Live in Texas
Chart (2003–2005)	Peak position
Australian Albums (ARIA)	18
Austrian Albums (Ö3 Austria)	5
Belgian Albums (Ultratop Flanders)	25
Belgian Albums (Ultratop Wallonia)	11
Danish Albums (Hitlisten)	18
Dutch Albums (Album Top 100)	43
French Albums (SNEP)	8
German Albums (Offizielle Top 100)	9
Greek Albums (IFPI Greece)	3
Irish Albums (IRMA)	67
Italian Albums (FIMI)	25
New Zealand Albums (RMNZ)	17
Polish Albums (ZPAV)	21
Portuguese Albums (AFP)	4
Scottish Albums (Official Charts)	45
Singaporean Albums (RIAS)	2
Swedish Albums (Sverigetopplistan)	45
Swiss Albums (Schweizer Hitparade)	9
UK Albums (Official Charts)	47
UK Rock & Metal Albums (Official Charts)	4
US Billboard 200	23

2017 weekly chart performance for Live in Texas
Chart (2017)	Peak position
Czech Albums (ČNS IFPI)	32

=== Year-end charts ===
2003 year-end chart performance for Live in Texas
Chart (2003)	Position
French Albums (SNEP)	92

2004 year-end chart performance for Live in Texas
Chart (2004)	Position
Austrian Albums (Ö3 Austria)	41
French Albums (SNEP)	169
German Albums (Offizielle Top 100)	53
Swiss Albums (Schweizer Hitparade)	50
US Billboard 200	88

== Certifications ==
Certifications and sales for Live in Texas
Region	Certification	Certified units/sales
Argentina (CAPIF) DVD	Platinum	8,000^{^}
Australia (ARIA)	Gold	35,000^{^}
Austria (IFPI Austria)	Gold	15,000^{*}
Brazil (Pro-Música Brasil)	Platinum	125,000^{*}
Canada (Music Canada)	Platinum	100,000^{^}
France (SNEP)	Gold	100,000^{*}
Germany (BVMI)	3× Gold	300,000^{^}
New Zealand (RMNZ)	Gold	7,500^{^}
Portugal (AFP)	Gold	20,000^{^}
Spain (Promusicae)	Gold	50,000^{^}
United Kingdom (BPI)	Gold	100,000^{^}
United States (RIAA)	Platinum	1,000,000^{^}
Summaries
Europe (IFPI)	Platinum	1,000,000^{*}
^{*} Sales figures based on certification alone.^{^} Shipments figures based on certification alone.
