= Collision Course (EP) =

2004 EP by Jay-Z and Linkin Park

EP / video album by Jay-Z and Linkin Park
- Released: November 30, 2004
- Recorded: July 16–19, 2004
- Genres: Rap rock; nu metal; alternative hip-hop
- Length: 21:15 (CD); 45:01 (DVD)
- Labels: Roc-A-Fella; Machine Shop; Def Jam; Warner Bros.
- Producer: Mike Shinoda

Linkin Park chronology
Live in Texas (2003)	Collision Course (2004)	Minutes to Midnight (2007)

Jay-Z chronology
Unfinished Business (2004)	Collision Course (2004)	Kingdom Come (2006)

Linkin Park video chronology
Live in Texas (2003)	Collision Course (2004)	Road to Revolution: Live at Milton Keynes (2008)

Singles from Collision Course
- 1. "Numb/Encore" Released: December 13, 2004

Collision Course is a mash-up EP from American rapper Jay-Z and American rock band Linkin Park, released on November 30, 2004, by Roc-A-Fella, Machine Shop, Warner Bros. and Def Jam. From Linkin Park's catalog, Collision Course features three songs from Meteora and four from Hybrid Theory. From Jay-Z's catalog, it features three songs from The Black Album, one from Vol. 3... Life and Times of S. Carter, one from Vol. 2... Hard Knock Life and one from The Blueprint. Before the album, Jay-Z had released collaborations with The Roots and R. Kelly, and Linkin Park had collaborated with various artists on their remix album Reanimation.

The album was inspired by The Grey Album by Danger Mouse, which was a mash-up album between Jay-Z and The Beatles. MTV had originally planned on mashing up only one or two songs, but the project was eventually expanded to a six-song album. The production on the album was mostly handled by Mike Shinoda and Jay-Z, and it was recorded between July 16 and July 19. The album spawned one single, "Numb/Encore" which won Best Rap/Sung Collaboration at the 48th Grammy Awards. The album received generally mixed reviews from music critics but despite that was a commercial success. It debuted at number one on the US Billboard 200 chart, selling 368,000 copies in its first week.

== Overview ==
Due to its short running time at 21:18, with six tracks in total included on the disc, the release has been identified as an EP. All of the tracks included are mashups combining songs by both artists.

The DVD contains behind-the-scenes new footage of the making of the album, as well as the second take of all of the Collision Course songs at The Roxy Theatre on July 18, 2004. Also included are the five scenes from the concert shown on MTV Ultimate Mash-Ups and a picture gallery.

The first single released from the EP, "Numb/Encore", achieved significant airplay on the charts, and stayed on six months after its release. "Points of Authority/99 Problems/One Step Closer" was also released to the radio in the US, but was never featured on the Billboard Charts – the videos for both that track and "Jigga What/Faint" were also seen on Kerrang! in the UK. "Izzo/In the End" was also heavily promoted on the official Linkin Park websites.

== Background and production ==
Quote from the DVD

"This is so fun! This whole project is, like, fun!"

— Mike Shinoda,

Mike Shinoda revealed that he would be mashing up with Jay-Z for a record under MTV's Mash Ups show.

The network allowed Jay-Z to choose a group or artist for the mash-up. Jay contacted Shinoda, who began experimenting with mixing the tracks before sending some examples to him. As a result, Jay-Z began working with Shinoda through email. The two decided that instead of combining the existing tracks for the live performance on MTV, they wanted to re-work and re-record parts of the songs to make them fit better. Shinoda explains, "Jay and I realized it's better to re-perform the rap vocals if you're gonna do it to a new beat because the vibe changes and you have to deliver your verse a little differently." Shinoda asked his bandmates to re-record instrumental and vocal tracks as well, and ultimately both parties decided they wanted to release the studio tracks. The entire album was put together within four days.

Sometimes, behind-the-scenes audio can be heard within the album, such as Jay-Z saying "You're wasting your talent, Randy!" before "Big Pimpin'/Papercut", or Shinoda saying "This is fun" before "Izzo/In the End".

Collision Course was the first album of Linkin Park that contained a Parental Advisory sticker, since most of Jay-Z's verses contain profanity (although Shinoda and Chester Bennington are also heard using vulgar language on the album). This album was also made in an edited/censored version. However, the clean version of the album left the words "bitch", "ass", and "hoes" uncensored, which means that "Izzo/In the End" is the same on the clean and explicit versions.

A year after the release of Collision Course, Jay-Z was the executive producer on Mike Shinoda's solo effort Fort Minor's The Rising Tied. Also, the song "High Road" from the same record talks about how some critics negatively received Collision Course.

== Critical reception ==
Professional ratings
Review scores
Source	Rating
AllMusic	3.5/5 stars
Entertainment Weekly	C−
The Guardian	1/5 stars
HipHopDX	4/5 stars
The Independent	1/5 stars
NME	3/10
Now	2/5 stars
RapReviews	7.5/10
Rolling Stone	2/5 stars
Spin	B

Collision Course received generally mixed reviews from music critics. David Jeffries of AllMusic praised the album, calling it "awesomely fun". K.B. Tindal of HipHopDX also equally praised the album, saying that the project "will open a passageway for artists who want to dare to be different as well as those who want to work hard to maintain that difference." Steve Juon of RapReviews called the album "an experiment which bodes well since for the most part these two artists compliment [sic] each other."

Meanwhile, Raymond Fiore of Entertainment Weekly, gave a negative review of the album, saying that the pairing of Linkin Park and Jay-Z "comes off like a sanitized nonevent." At the 48th Grammy Awards, the song "Numb/Encore", a mash-up of "Numb" by Linkin Park and "Encore" by Jay-Z, won the Grammy Award for Best Rap/Sung Collaboration. "Points of Authority/99 Problems/One Step Closer" was listed in the 2011 book 1001 Songs You Must Hear Before You Die.

== Commercial performance ==
Collision Course debuted at number one on the US Billboard 200 chart, selling 368,000 copies in its first week, according to Nielsen Soundscan. This became Jay-Z eighth US number one album and Linkin Park's second. It also became the second EP ever to top the chart, preceded by Alice in Chains' Jar of Flies in 1994. In its second week, the EP dropped to number nine on the chart, selling an additional 186,000 copies. In its third week, the EP dropped to number ten on the chart, selling 236,000 more copies. In its fourth week, the EP climbed to number eight on the chart, selling 283,000 more copies. As of August 2009, the EP has sold 1,934,000 copies in the US. On August 15, 2017, the EP was certified double platinum by the Recording Industry Association of America (RIAA) for combined sales and album-equivalent units of over two million units in the United States.

== Track listing ==
No.	Title	Writer(s)	Length
1.	"Dirt off Your Shoulder / Lying from You"	Linkin Park; Shawn Carter; Timothy Mosley	4:04
2.	"Big Pimpin' / Papercut"	Linkin Park; Carter; Mosley; J. Capeless; K. Joshua	2:36
3.	"Jigga What / Faint"	Linkin Park; Carter; Mosley; Jonathan Burks	3:31
4.	"Numb / Encore"	Linkin Park; Carter; Kanye West	3:25
5.	"Izzo / In the End"	Linkin Park; Carter; West; Berry Gordy; Alphonzo Mizell; Freddie Perren; Deke Richards	2:44
6.	"Points of Authority / 99 Problems / One Step Closer"	Linkin Park; Carter; Rick Rubin; Tracy Marrow; Bernard Freeman; Alphonso Henderson; Leslie Weinstein; Norman Landsberg; Felix Pappalardi; Norman Smart; John Ventura; William Squier; Kenneth Gamble; Leon Huff	4:55
Total length:			21:15

=== Enhanced content on CD ===
1. "Links to Bonus Content"
2. "Photos"

=== DVD track listing ===
1. Intro
2. In the Studio
3. Jay-Z Arrives
4. Rehearsal
5. Sound Check
6. Dirt Off Your Shoulder/Lying from You (Live)
7. Big Pimpin'/Papercut (Live)
8. Jigga What/Faint (Live)
9. Numb/Encore (Live)
10. Izzo/In the End (Live)
11. Points of Authority/99 Problems/One Step Closer (Live)
12. End Credits

==== Special Features ====
1. "MTV Ultimate Mash-Ups"
  - It's Goin' Down
  - Dirt Off You Shoulder/Lying from You
  - Jigga What/Faint
  - Numb/Encore
  - Points of Authority/99 Problems/One Step Closer
1. "Photo Gallery"
2. "5.1 Surround Sound"

== Personnel ==
Linkin Park

- Chester Bennington – vocals ("Dirt off Your Shoulder / Lying from You", "Jigga What / Faint", & "Points of Authority / 99 Problems / One Step Closer"), backing vocals ("Big Pimpin' / Papercut" & "Izzo / In the End"), lead vocals ("Numb / Encore")
- Rob Bourdon – drums
- Brad Delson – guitar
- Dave "Phoenix" Farrell – bass guitar
- Joe Hahn – turntables, sampling, programming
- Mike Shinoda – vocals ("Dirt off Your Shoulder / Lying from You", "Jigga What / Faint", & "Numb / Encore"), lead vocals ("Big Pimpin' / Papercut", "Izzo / In the End", & "Points of Authority / 99 Problems / One Step Closer"), additional guitar ("Jigga What / Faint"), keyboard, piano (4)

Jay-Z

- Shawn Carter – lead vocals
- Kanye West – backing vocals ("Numb / Encore")

Production

- Produced and mixed by Mike Shinoda
- Arranged by Brad Delson and Mike Shinoda
- Engineered by Mike Shinoda, John Ewing and Mark Kiczula
- Mastered by Brain "Big Bass" Gardner at Bernie Grundman Mastering
- Executive producers: Shawn Carter and Linkin Park
- A&R: Tom Whalley
- A&R coordination for Warner Bros. Records: Marny Cameron
- Marketing director: Peter Standish
- A&R coordinator: Michael "Stick" Stefrin
- Production coordinator: Ryan DeMarti
- Sample clearance: Eric Weissman for Sample Clearance Limited
- Executive producers: Rob McDermott and John Meneilly
- Creative direction for Warner Bros. Records: Ellen Wakayama
- Project art direction: THE FLEM and Mike Shinoda
- Cover art direction and design: THE FLEM
- Cover and all interior line art illustrations: David Choe
- Digipak and booklet art direction and design: Lawrence Azerrad for LAD
- Photography: Greg Watermann

=== DVD ===
- Director: Kimo Proudfoot
- Producer: Matt Caltabiano
- Editor: Kevin McCullough
- Live audio engineer: Guy Charbonneau
- Live audio mix: Mike Shinoda
- Executive producer: Janet Haase
- Head of production: Joby Barnhart
- Post production supervisor: Jason Cohon
- For Sunset Editorial: Nazeli Kodjoian, Sin Halina Sy
- Additional footage produced by Lenny Santiago
- 5.1 mixed of Roxy Performance
- DVD post producer: David May
- Associate producer: Raena Winscott
- Menu design: Sean Donelly
- 5.1 mix producer: David May
- 5.1 mix engineer: Ted Hall
- Assistant engineer: Bruce Balestier
- Audio mix: Mix Magic
- Colorist: Dave Hussey
- Title graphics: Carlos
- Authoring: Cinram
- Live performance filmed July 18, 2004 at The Roxy Theatre, West Hollywood, CA
- Original concept by Michele Megan Dix and Jesse Ignjatovic

== Charts ==
=== Weekly charts ===
Chart (2004–05)	Peak position
Australian Albums (ARIA)	8
Austrian Albums (Ö3 Austria)	5
Belgian Albums (Ultratop Flanders)	19
Belgian Albums (Ultratop Wallonia)	17
Canadian Albums (Billboard)	6
Danish Albums (Hitlisten)	7
Dutch Albums (Album Top 100)	9
French Albums (SNEP)	20
German Albums (Offizielle Top 100)	5
Greek International Albums (IFPI)	2
Irish Albums (IRMA)	6
Italian Albums (FIMI)	19
Japanese Albums (Oricon)	9
New Zealand Albums (RMNZ)	4
Norwegian Albums (VG-lista)	1
Portuguese Albums (AFP)	4
Scottish Albums (Official Charts)	18
Singaporean Albums (RIAS)	3
Spanish Albums (Promusicae)	60
Swedish Albums (Sverigetopplistan)	9
Swiss Albums (Schweizer Hitparade)	2
UK Albums (Official Charts)	15
UK R&B Albums (OCC)	2
US Billboard 200	1
US Top R&B/Hip-Hop Albums (Billboard)	3
US Top Rap Albums (Billboard)	3

Chart (2017–2024)	Peak position
Australian Albums (ARIA)	28
Hungarian Physical Albums (MAHASZ)	22

=== Year-end charts ===
Chart (2004)	Position
Australian Albums (ARIA)	80
UK Albums (OCC)	138
Worldwide Albums (IFPI)	29

Chart (2005)	Position
Australian Albums (ARIA)	42
Austrian Albums (Ö3 Austria)	33
Belgian Albums (Ultratop Flanders)	84
European Albums (Billboard)	27
German Albums (Offizielle Top 100)	33
Japanese Albums (Oricon)	84
Swiss Albums (Schweizer Hitparade)	20
UK Albums (OCC)	146
US Billboard 200	26
US Top R&B/Hip-Hop Albums (Billboard)	20

== Certifications ==
Region	Certification	Certified units/sales
Australia (ARIA)	Platinum	70,000^{^}
Austria (IFPI Austria)	Gold	15,000^{*}
Brazil (Pro-Música Brasil)	Gold	50,000^{*}
Canada (Music Canada)	2× Platinum	200,000^{^}
Denmark (IFPI Danmark)	Gold	20,000^{^}
France (SNEP)	Gold	100,000^{*}
Germany (BVMI)	Platinum	200,000^{^}
Ireland (IRMA)	2× Platinum	30,000^{^}
Japan (RIAJ)	Gold	100,000^{^}
New Zealand (RMNZ)	2× Platinum	30,000^{‡}
Portugal (AFP)	Gold	20,000^{^}
Switzerland (IFPI Switzerland)	Platinum	40,000^{^}
United Kingdom (BPI)	Platinum	300,000^{^}
United States (RIAA)	2× Platinum	2,000,000^{‡}
^{*} Sales figures based on certification alone.^{^} Shipments figures based on certification alone.^{‡} Sales+streaming figures based on certification alone.
