= Kimo Proudfoot =

American film director

Kimo Proudfoot is an American director of music videos and concert films.

Born in Honolulu, Hawaii, Proudfoot has directed videos for several artists & groups such as Fort Minor ("Remember the Name"), Soulfly ("Roots Bloody Roots"), No Warning ("Bad Timing"), and Jay-Z & Linkin Park ("Numb/Encore"). He has also directed the concert film Live in Texas covering Linkin Park's appearance on the Summer Sanitarium Tour in 2003.

Filmography for Kimo Proudfoot
| Date | Title | Type | Position | Source |
|---|---|---|---|---|
| 2010 | The Rocket Project | Documentary | Camera operator | |
| 2010 | Racing Under Green II | Documentary | Cinematographer | |
| 2009 | Dig It! | Documentary | Camera operator | |
| 2008 | Racing Under Green | Documentary | Cinematographer | |
| 2006 | The Last Supper: Live at the Hammerstein Ballroom | Concert film | Director | |
| January 2006 | Remember the Name — Fort Minor feat. Styles of Beyond | Music video | Director | |
| March 2005 | Roots Bloody Roots (Live) — Soulfly | Music video | Director | |
| March 2005 | Bad Timing — No Warning | Music video | Director | |
| 2004 | Lying from You (live) — Linkin Park | Music video | Director | |
| November 2004 | Numb/Encore — Jay-Z & Linkin Park | Music video | Director | |
| May 2004 | Breaking the Habit (5.28.04 3:37 P.M.) — Linkin Park | Music video | Director | |
| August 2003 | Live in Texas — Linkin Park | Concert film | Director | |
| 1993 | A Far-Off Place | | Production assistant | |
