= What I've Done =

2007 single by Linkin Park

Single by Linkin Park

from the album Minutes to Midnight and Transformers: The Album
- B-side: "Faint" (Live); "From the Inside" (Live)
- Released: April 2, 2007
- Studio: The Mansion (Los Angeles, California)
- Genre: Alternative rock; hard rock
- Length: 3:25 (album version); 3:28 (single version)
- Label: Warner Bros.
- Composer: Linkin Park
- Lyricists: Chester Bennington; Mike Shinoda
- Producers: Rick Rubin; Mike Shinoda

Linkin Park singles chronology
"Numb/Encore" (2004)	"What I've Done" (2007)	"Bleed It Out" (2007)

Music video
- "What I've Done" on YouTube

"What I've Done" is a song by American rock band Linkin Park. It was released as the first single from their third studio album, Minutes to Midnight (2007), and is the sixth track. The song was released as a digital download and radio single on April 2, 2007, and as a CD single on April 30. The live version of "What I've Done" from Road to Revolution: Live at Milton Keynes was nominated for Best Hard Rock Performance at the 52nd Grammy Awards, but did not win. It serves as the end credits track of the 2007 science fiction film Transformers, also appearing on its soundtrack. Being certified six times platinum by the RIAA, it is the band's most commercially successful single in terms of pure sales, and reached number 7 on the Billboard Hot 100. In January 2025, the song became the fourth by the band to surpass one billion streams on Spotify.

The song is also a B-side to the UK single of "Iridescent", the theme for the film Transformers: Dark of the Moon.

== Composition ==
Chester Bennington described the track in a March 2007 interview with MTV:

Joe [Hahn] came up to Mike and I and asked us to take the whole idea of Minutes to Midnight and apply that to how the band has changed. So, in a way, it's us saying goodbye to how we used to be...The lyrics in the first verse are 'In this farewell, there's no blood, there's no alibi,' and right away, you'll notice that the band sounds different: The drums are much more raw, the guitars are more raw and the vocals aren't tripled. It's just us out there .... and that's how Rick Rubin wanted it.

The single and video appeared in the iTunes Store shortly after midnight EST on April 2, 2007. It became available the day after on iTunes in the UK and Australia. On April 2, the song was featured streaming on the front page of their official website, with the video being added to the site shortly thereafter.

"What I've Done"
A 19-second sample of the chorus of "What I've Done".

The song is composed in the key of G minor. "What I've Done" was the last song written for Minutes to Midnight. The song also has a downbeat exactly once every second, consistent throughout its entirety.

Shinoda created a remix of the song, which is called "What I've Done (Distorted Remix)", which is included as a B-side to "Bleed It Out". The remix was then included in the international tour edition of Minutes to Midnight, as well as a track in the Linkin Park Underground-exclusive CD Underground X: Demos.

== Music videos ==
=== Main music video ===
The music video for "What I've Done" was filmed in the California desert and was directed by Linkin Park turntablist Joe Hahn. The video begins with grass sinking down into the dirt, causing it to turn wet. It features footage of the band performing in an area outside of the city, interspersed with footage showing many political movements and humanitarian issues including pollution, racism, Nazism, the Ku Klux Klan, terrorism, Holocaust, deforestation, poverty, drug addiction, obesity, war, destruction, rising gasoline prices, and crimes committed by humanity. The video ends with the same clip from the beginning but played in reverse, where it has the grass re-growing. The video premiered on April 2, 2007, on MTV and Fuse. It premiered on MTV Asia, MTV Germany, TMF Netherlands and Canada's MuchMusic on April 3, 2007.

The video clip was featured and won on MTV's Battle of the Videos against videos by Evanescence ("Sweet Sacrifice") and Lil' Mama ("Lip Gloss"). The video also marks the first appearance of a Linkin Park video in the #1 spot on MTV's TRL, hitting #1 six times so far. AOL currently has a live performance of "What I've Done" on their website. MTV's James Montgomery called "What I've Done" the "biggest, baddest and best Linkin Park video of all time," praising the visuals as well as the numerous political figures and events occurring within the video. He summarized the video's message: "Hahn was smart — or brave — enough to inject a message here: the destructive power of man versus the unyielding beauty of nature, and where it all will undoubtedly end ()."

As mentioned in episode 89 of MTV Cribs, Chester's jacket was lent to him by Yellowcard frontman Ryan Key.

=== Alternate music video ===
A second video, made exclusively for Australia, features a considerably different scenario from the first; instead of clips of human sin, the video tells the story of a woman (played by Emma Mullings) working at a government-run pharmaceutical company learning of a plan to develop a deadly new virus for "social control", and – with the help of several people dressed in black hooded sweatshirts with Linkin Park's logo on them – smuggles out several blood samples of a human test subject of the virus to expose the conspiracy. The video can be seen on YouTube and Linkin Park's Australian website.

== Commercial performance ==
The song made big debuts on the US charts during the chart week of April 21, 2007. The song debuted in the top 10 of the US Hot 100 on April 10, 2007, at #7. It is the band's second highest debut to date on the chart (this title was previously held by "Somewhere I Belong" which opened at #47), earning "Hot Shot" debut of the week, and subsequently becoming the third highest position for a Linkin Park single to date on the Hot 100. The song was their highest debut until they released "New Divide" in May 2009. At the time of its debut it was only the eleventh song since 2000 to debut at #7 or higher on the Hot 100, and only the third song to do so by an artist not from American Idol. The song was partly fueled by digital sales, debuting at #4 on the digital chart. The song was certified 6× Platinum by the RIAA on May 12, 2022. It reached 3 million downloads by early 2011, making it their most successful digital song in the US. As of January 2015, the song has sold 3,700,000 copies in the US.

In addition the song became only the third song ever to open at #1 on the Modern Rock chart, also becoming the band's seventh number one on the chart. It held the #1 spot on Alternative Songs for 15 consecutive weeks, at the time tying it with Marcy Playground's "Sex and Candy," and was the number one song for the year on this chart. The song also reached #1 on the Mainstream Rock chart, where it stayed for 8 consecutive weeks. In the iTunes music store, the song had reached number two. It was kept out of the top spot by "Give It to Me" by Timbaland. The music video is the first to reach the number 1 spot on TRL for Linkin Park video history. It has also become a moderate hit on the Adult Top 40, and Pop 100 Airplay charts, peaking at number 21 and 17 respectively on those charts.

The song hit #6 in the UK once the physical format was released, making it Linkin Park's highest-charting UK single for over 17 years, until "The Emptiness Machine" reached #4 in September 2024.

In September 2023, for the 35th anniversary of Modern Rock Tracks (by which time it had been renamed to Alternative Airplay), Billboard ranked "What I've Done" at number 64 on its list of the 100 most successful songs in the chart's history.

== Usage in media ==
"What I've Done" was featured in the 2007 science fiction film Transformers, where it appears in the final scene and the closing credits. The song is also present on Transformers: The Album, which features the movie soundtrack. The song was also featured in the 2008 video game Guitar Hero World Tour.

== Track listings ==
All tracks are written by Linkin Park.

CD1 • 7" picture disc
No.	Title	Length
1.	"What I've Done"	3:29
2.	"Faint" (Live)	2:46

CD2 • Australian single • iTunes EP
No.	Title	Length
1.	"What I've Done"	3:28
2.	"Faint" (Live)	2:46
3.	"From the Inside" (Live)	3:31

== Personnel ==
- Chester Bennington – lead vocals
- Mike Shinoda – rhythm guitar, backing vocals, keyboards, piano
- Brad Delson – lead guitar
- Dave "Phoenix" Farrell – bass
- Joe Hahn – turntables, samples
- Rob Bourdon – drums

== Charts ==
=== Weekly charts ===
2007 weekly chart performance for "What I've Done"
Chart (2007)	Peak position
Australia (ARIA)	13
Austria (Ö3 Austria Top 40)	8
Belgium (Ultratop 50 Flanders)	26
Belgium (Ultratop 50 Wallonia)	24
Canada Hot 100 (Billboard)	3
Canada CHR/Top 40 (Billboard)	18
Canada Rock (Billboard)	1
Czech Republic Airplay (ČNS IFPI)	2
Finland (Suomen virallinen lista)	1
Germany (GfK)	4
Ireland (IRMA)	15
Italy (FIMI)	3
Netherlands (Dutch Top 40)	26
Netherlands (Single Top 100)	28
New Zealand (Recorded Music NZ)	9
Norway (VG-lista)	12
Russia Airplay (TopHit)	53
Scottish Singles Sales (Official Charts)	4
Slovakia Airplay (ČNS IFPI)	16
Sweden (Sverigetopplistan)	6
Switzerland (Schweizer Hitparade)	6
UK Singles (Official Charts)	6
UK Rock & Metal (Official Charts)	1
US Billboard Hot 100	7
US Pop 100 (Billboard)	8
US Adult Pop Airplay (Billboard)	21
US Alternative Airplay (Billboard)	1
US Mainstream Rock Airplay (Billboard)	1
US Pop Airplay (Billboard)	17

2012 weekly chart performance for "What I've Done"
Chart (2012)	Peak position
Germany (GfK)	81

2014 weekly chart performance for "What I've Done"
Chart (2014)	Peak position
Czech Republic Singles Digital (ČNS IFPI)	100

2017 weekly chart performance for "What I've Done"
Chart (2017)	Peak position
France (SNEP)	178
Hungary (Stream Top 40)	38
Portugal (AFP)	53
US Hot Rock & Alternative Songs (Billboard)	7

2021 weekly chart performance for "What I've Done"
Chart (2021)	Peak position
Finland Airplay (Radiosoittolista)	80

2025 weekly chart performance for "What I've Done"
Chart (2025)	Peak position
Finland Airplay (Radiosoittolista)	87

2026 weekly chart performance for "What I've Done"
Chart (2026)	Peak position
Finland Airplay (Radiosoittolista)	74

=== Year-end charts ===
2007 year-end chart performance for "What I've Done"
Chart (2007)	Position
Australia (ARIA)	39
Austria (Ö3 Austria Top 40)	50
Belgium (Ultratop 50 Flanders)	92
Belgium (Ultratop 50 Wallonia)	87
Brazil (Crowley)	47
Germany (Media Control GfK)	45
Italy (FIMI)	28
New Zealand (RIANZ)	21
Russia Airplay (TopHit)	160
Sweden (Sverigetopplistan)	53
Switzerland (Schweizer Hitparade)	26
UK Singles (OCC)	63
US Billboard Hot 100	38
US Alternative Songs (Billboard)	1
US Mainstream Rock Songs (Billboard)	5

2017 year-end chart performance for "What I've Done"
Chart (2017)	Position
US Hot Rock Songs (Billboard)	67

== Certifications ==
Certifications and sales for "What I've Done"
Region	Certification	Certified units/sales
Denmark (IFPI Danmark)	Platinum	90,000^{‡}
Germany (BVMI)	2× Platinum	600,000^{‡}
Italy (FIMI)	Platinum	50,000^{‡}
Japan (RIAJ) Full-length ringtone	Gold	100,000^{*}
New Zealand (RMNZ)	3× Platinum	90,000^{‡}
Portugal (AFP)	2× Platinum	50,000^{‡}
Spain (Promusicae)	Gold	30,000^{‡}
Sweden (GLF)	Gold	10,000^{^}
Switzerland (IFPI Switzerland)	Platinum	30,000^{^}
United Kingdom (BPI)	2× Platinum	1,200,000^{‡}
United States (RIAA)	6× Platinum	6,000,000^{‡}
^{*} Sales figures based on certification alone.^{^} Shipments figures based on certification alone.^{‡} Sales+streaming figures based on certification alone.

== Release history ==
Release dates and formats for "What I've Done"
Country	Date	Format	Label	Ref.
Worldwide	April 2, 2007	Digital download	Warner Bros.	
United States	April 2, 2007	Modern rock airplay	Warner Bros.	

== See also ==
- List of Billboard number-one alternative singles of the 2000s
