= Emma Mullings =

Australian singer

Emma Mullings is an Australian television presenter, radio announcer, singer, actor, writer and producer. She is currently Mornings Presenter on Hope 103.2 in Sydney from 9 am to 1 pm weekdays.

== Career ==
=== Television ===
Mullings co-hosted Positive Hits, a Christian entertainment show. She hosted Hits Blitz in 2007 which aired on WIN TV and was produced by Headlock Media and Sony/BMG. She was the guest speaker at C3 Carling ford's women's event 'Inspire' in mid-2016. She was a guest speaker at SHINE women's conference. She won the MusicOz Award for pop category in 2003, and was also nominated in the alternative category and artist of the year category. Mullings played "Kirsten" in Redfern Now Series 2.

=== Music ===
Mullings released her debut EP in 2016. Her 2016 debut single "Skinny Roads" went straight to number one on the iTunes Inspirational charts on the day of release, and spent three weeks at number 1 on the TCM charts. In its first week of distribution to Australian radio, the song debuted on the TCM chart @ #18, the highest ever for an Australian artist, and became one of the most-played Christian songs on Australian Christian radio that week. It remained in the top 30 clocking up and impressive 28 weeks. The music video received regular airplay on MTV Australia. In January 2017 it was announced that "Skinny Roads" was the most played song on Christian radio across Australia for 2016. It was also nominated for 2016 APRA song of the year. January 2017 saw "Skinny Roads" break into the top 30 on the Billboard Christian Hot AC/CHR chart in the US, with the second-highest debut of the week at #28.

The follow-up single, "Dream Again", debuted at number 1 on the iTunes Inspiration Charts and at number 4 on the Australian Christian Charts. It hit number 1 on Australia's Hot 25 countdown.

Mullings' debut six-track EP, Skinny Roads, was released worldwide on 25 October 2016.

In the same week, Mullings won the MusicOz Australian Independent Music Award for the Christian category with the song "Skinny Roads". "Love Unguarded", "Worthy", and "Holding On", which all appear on the EP, were also nominated for the award.

Mullings also won the Artist of the Year award at the 2016 Music Oz Australian Independent Music Awards.

In January 2017, "Love Unguarded" and "Worthy" (featuring Brad Sabat) were released consecutively to Australian radio.

She was featured on Linkin Park's What I've Done Music Video (Australian Version)
