= From the Inside (Linkin Park song) =

Single by Linkin Park

from the album Meteora
- B-side: "Runaway" (Live in Texas); "From the Inside" (Live in Texas)
- Released: January 12, 2004
- Studio: Soundtrack Studios; (New York City)
- Genre: Nu metal
- Length: 2:53
- Label: Warner Bros.
- Songwriters: Chester Bennington; Mike Shinoda; Brad Delson; Dave "Phoenix" Farrell; Joe Hahn; Rob Bourdon
- Producers: Don Gilmore; Linkin Park

Linkin Park singles chronology
"Numb" (2003)	"From the Inside" (2004)	"Breaking the Habit" (2004)

Music video
- "From the Inside" on YouTube

"From the Inside" is a song by American rock band Linkin Park. It was released as the fourth single from their second album, Meteora (2003), and appears as the tenth track on the record. It was released in Australia and the United States (it was released as download only in the UK) in 2004 as the fourth single from the album.

== Overview ==
The song is one of Linkin Park's heavier songs and is written in a 6/8 time signature. It progresses from a more melodic-stylization at the song's beginning, but then grows more intense towards the end. The song also features more screamed vocals, with Bennington screaming for about 10 seconds straight during the bridge. The earliest version of the song can be heard on "Frat Party at the Pankake Festival". In this version, part of the unfinished instrumental can be heard for a few seconds, when Mike Shinoda talks about making new music. There is also an interlude to the next track at the end of the song, like many of the other tracks on the album, in this case leading into "Nobody's Listening".

The Live in Texas performance of "From the Inside" was included as the single's B-side. Other live performances of the song were included as the B-side to both "Numb" and "What I've Done", respectively.

== Music video ==
The music video was directed by the band's turntablist, Joe Hahn. It takes place during a riot. In the middle of the riot are Mike Shinoda and Chester Bennington, who are shown singing during their respective parts. The rest of the band appears playing their instruments in the center of the town where the riot is taking place each time the chorus returns. The video is centered on a child who is abandoned by his guardian during the chaos. The child wanders around in the midst of the riot. Towards the climax the child screams, which knocks down the entire crowd and therefore stops the riot and all the rubble starts rising and eventually falls when the child runs out of breath. Near the end of the video, the child looks at the destruction, smiles, then screams again.

The video was filmed in early September 2003, during the band's Europe '03 tour in Prague, Czech Republic. The making of the video can be found on LPTV ("Season 2") episode 4.

== Track listing ==
No.	Title	Writer(s)	Length
1.	"From the Inside"	Linkin Park	2:53
2.	"Runaway" (Live in Texas)	Linkin Park; Wakefield	3:07
3.	"From the Inside" (Live in Texas)	Linkin Park	3:00

== Personnel ==
Linkin Park

- Chester Bennington – vocals
- Rob Bourdon – drums
- Brad Delson – lead guitar
- Dave "Phoenix" Farrell – bass guitar
- Joe Hahn – turntables, samplers
- Mike Shinoda – keyboards, rap vocals, rhythm guitar

Production

- Don Gilmore – producer

== Commercial performance ==
The song is the least successful single from Meteora. It is the only single from the album that did not reach the Modern Rock Tracks chart or the Billboard Hot 100 chart in Billboard.

== Charts ==
Chart performance for "From the Inside"
Chart (2004–2017)	Peak position
Australia (ARIA)	37
Austria (Ö3 Austria Top 40)	42
France (SNEP)	35
Germany (GfK)	35
Greece (IFPI)	15
Italy (FIMI)	30
New Zealand (Recorded Music NZ)	50
Sweden (Sverigetopplistan)	54
Switzerland (Schweizer Hitparade)	38
UK Rock & Metal (OCC)	15

== Certifications ==
Certifications for "From the Inside"
Region	Certification	Certified units/sales
New Zealand (RMNZ)	Gold	15,000^{‡}
United Kingdom (BPI)	Silver	200,000^{‡}
^{‡} Sales+streaming figures based on certification alone.
