= Faint (song) =

Single by Linkin Park

from the album Meteora
- B-side: "Lying from You" (Live); "One Step Closer" (Reanimated Live)
- Released: June 9, 2003
- Genre: Nu metal; alternative metal; alternative rock; rap rock; pop rock
- Length: 2:42
- Label: Warner Bros.
- Songwriter: Linkin Park
- Producers: Don Gilmore; Linkin Park

Linkin Park singles chronology
"Somewhere I Belong" (2003)	"Faint" (2003)	"Numb" (2003)

Music video
- "Faint" on YouTube

"Faint" is a song by American rock band Linkin Park from their second studio album, Meteora. The song was released as the album's second single on June 9, 2003, and is the seventh track. It entered the top thirty on the majority of the charts it appeared on. On the Hot 100, it peaked at No. 48. The song reached No. 1 on the US Modern Rock Tracks, becoming the band's third number-one hit on the chart.

The song would later be featured on the group's mashup EP with Jay-Z, Collision Course, where it was mashed up with lyrics of the song "Jigga What, Jigga Who" from Vol. 2... Hard Knock Life. In May 2025, "Faint" became the band's fifth song to surpass one billion streams on Spotify.

== Overview ==
This song was released as two singles, "Faint 1" and "Faint 2." They differed in cover color and track listing ("Faint 1" is blue, and "Faint 2" is a brownish-green mixture). "Faint 1" was also released as a Canadian version that includes the tracks, but does not include the music video. "Faint 1" lists the length of "Lying from You" as 3:43 but is actually 3:04. "One Step Closer", on "Faint 2", is 3:43 long. A promotional sampler was given to members of the street team and some members of the LPU, the band's official fan club. A demo for the song can be found on the Underground 9.0 Fan Club release. It features Mike Shinoda rapping with different lyrics, with only some backing input from Chester Bennington. A live version of the track was featured as a b-side for "What I've Done".

The success of this single, and the success of Linkin Park's "Numb/Encore" mashup with Jay-Z, coincided with the circulation of an unofficial mashup combining "Faint" with "Toxic" by Britney Spears. The mashup, originally titled "NOWMASH – Faint Britney" (also known as "Faint/Toxic"), was created in 2004 by mashup artist John Marr (SCO Network) under the alias NOWMASH, and later received airplay on MTV.

In 2025, it was discovered that the intro is a reversed sample from "Tania Meets Klebb" from the James Bond film soundtrack From Russia With Love.

== Music video ==
The video, directed by Mark Romanek and shot in downtown Los Angeles, consists of the band performing in front of an audience and a floodlight. The audience consisted of members from the LPU. Almost the entire video is shot from behind the band, allowing the strong lighting to portray them in silhouettes. Therefore, the faces of the band are not shown throughout most of the video, except at the final chorus where the band is then shown from the front. They perform in front of a derelict building structure with graffiti, such as a monstrous version of the Hybrid Theory Soldier and some Linkin Park symbols.

== Commercial performance ==
"Faint" was officially released to US radio on July 1, 2003. The song reached the top twenty on the Hot 100 Recurrent Airplay, and the following week it debuted on the Hot 100, the official US chart. "Faint" peaked at number forty-eight in its eighth week and remained on the chart until its twentieth week. The song entered the top twenty on the majority of the Billboard charts on which it appeared. "Faint" proved popular on Modern Rock Tracks radio, attaining the number one position on that chart for six weeks (with 37 weeks on the chart), and peaked at number two for two weeks on the US Mainstream Rock Tracks.

"Faint" reached the top thirty on the Canadian Singles Chart where it peaked at 21.

The song was released in Australia, Europe and New Zealand on July 22, 2003. "Somewhere I Belong" reached the UK top ten, while "Faint" reached the top twenty. "Faint" continued the trend of lower-charting singles when it debuted and peaked at number fifteen, and remained in the chart for 8 weeks. "Faint" peaked at number twenty-five on the Australian Singles Chart and stayed at its peak for two weeks.

"Faint" reached 67 on the Japanese singles chart and 48 on the Eurochart Hot 100 Singles and it would also peak at forty in seven countries and reached the top twenty in the United Kingdom and Spain. It was a moderate top ten success on the LAUNCH Music Videos Top 100.

In September 2023, for the 35th anniversary of Modern Rock Tracks (which by then had been renamed to Alternative Airplay), Billboard ranked "Faint" at number 92 on its list of the 100 most successful songs in the chart's history.

== Critical reception ==
"Faint" is widely regarded as one of Linkin Park's best songs. In 2017, Billboard ranked the song number two on their list of the 15 greatest Linkin Park songs, and in 2021, Kerrang ranked the song number three on their list of the 20 greatest Linkin Park songs.

== Track listing ==
All tracks are written by Linkin Park.

Part 1
No.	Title	Length
1.	"Faint"	2:43
2.	"Lying from You" (Live)	3:07
3.	"Somewhere I Belong" (Video)

All tracks are written by Linkin Park.

Part 2
No.	Title	Length
1.	"Faint"	2:43
2.	"One Step Closer" (Reanimated Live)	3:43
3.	"Faint Live" (Video)

All tracks are written by Linkin Park.

Maxi single
No.	Title	Length
1.	"Faint"	2:43
2.	"Lying from You" (Live)	3:06
3.	"One Step Closer" (Reanimated Live)	3:41

All tracks are written by Linkin Park.

10" vinyl picture disc
No.	Title	Length
1.	"Faint"	2:43
2.	"Lying from You" (Live)	3:07

== Personnel ==
Linkin Park

- Chester Bennington – vocals
- Mike Shinoda – strings arrangement, rap vocals, rhythm guitar, sampler
- Brad Delson – lead guitar
- Dave "Phoenix" Farrell – bass
- Joe Hahn – turntables, samplers, synthesizers
- Rob Bourdon – drums

Additional musicians

- Joel Derouin, Charlie Bisharat, Alyssa Park, Sara Parkins, Michelle Richards, Mark Robertson – violins
- Evan Wilson, Bob Becker – violas
- Larry Corbett, Dan Smith – cellos
- David Campbell – strings arrangement

== Charts ==
=== Weekly charts ===
2003–2004 weekly chart performance for "Faint"
Chart (2003–04)	Peak position
Australia (ARIA)	25
Austria (Ö3 Austria Top 40)	27
Belgium (Ultratop 50 Flanders)	44
Belgium (Ultratip Bubbling Under Wallonia)	5
Canada (Billboard)	21
Chile (Notimex)	2
Croatia (HRT)	8
Ecuador (Notimex)	1
European Hot 100 Singles (Billboard)	35
Germany (GfK)	40
Hungary (Single Top 40)	3
Ireland (IRMA)	26
Italy (FIMI)	29
Netherlands (Dutch Top 40)	40
Netherlands (Single Top 100)	20
Paraguay (Notimex)	2
Scottish Singles Sales (Official Charts)	15
Spain (Promusicae)	18
Sweden (Sverigetopplistan)	49
Switzerland (Schweizer Hitparade)	32
UK Singles (Official Charts)	15
UK Rock & Metal (Official Charts)	3
US Billboard Hot 100	48
US Alternative Airplay (Billboard)	1
US Mainstream Rock Airplay (Billboard)	2

2017 weekly chart performance for "Faint"
Chart (2017)	Peak position
Czech Republic Singles Digital (ČNS IFPI)	71
Slovakia Singles Digital (ČNS IFPI)	86
US Hot Rock & Alternative Songs (Billboard)	15

2024 weekly chart performance for "Faint"
Chart (2024)	Peak position
Global 200 (Billboard)	102
Greece International (IFPI)	86

=== Year-end charts ===
Year-end chart performance for "Faint"
Chart (2003)	Position
US Mainstream Rock Tracks (Billboard)	12
US Modern Rock Tracks (Billboard)	5

=== Decade-end charts ===
Decade-end chart performance for "Faint"
Chart (2000–2009)	Peak position
US Hot Alternative Songs (Billboard)	8
US Hot Rock Songs (Billboard)	13

== Certifications ==
Certifications and sales for "Faint"
Region	Certification	Certified units/sales
Denmark (IFPI Danmark)	Platinum	90,000^{‡}
Germany (BVMI)	Platinum	600,000^{‡}
Italy (FIMI)	Gold	35,000^{‡}
New Zealand (RMNZ)	3× Platinum	90,000^{‡}
Portugal (AFP)	2× Platinum	20,000^{‡}
Spain (Promusicae)	Platinum	100,000^{‡}
United Kingdom (BPI)	Platinum	644,000
United States (RIAA)	Platinum	1,000,000^{‡}
^{‡} Sales+streaming figures based on certification alone.
