= Numb/Encore =

2004 single by Jay-Z and Linkin Park

Single by Jay-Z and Linkin Park

from the EP Collision Course
- B-side: "Numb/Encore" (Instrumental)
- Released: December 13, 2004
- Recorded: July 2004
- Genre: Rap rock; alternative rock; hip-hop
- Length: 3:25
- Label: Roc-A-Fella; Def Jam; Warner Bros.; Machine Shop
- Songwriters: Shawn Carter; Timothy Mosley; Chester Bennington; Mike Shinoda; Brad Delson; Rob Bourdon; Joe Hahn; Dave Farrell
- Producers: Mike Shinoda; Don Gilmore

Linkin Park singles chronology
| "Breaking the Habit" (2004) | "Numb/Encore" (2004) | "What I've Done" (2007) |

Jay-Z singles chronology
| "Don't Let Me Die" (2004) | "Numb/Encore" (2004) | "Dear Summer" (2005) |

Alternative cover
- Digital cover

Music video
- "Numb/Encore" on YouTube

"Numb/Encore" is a song by American rapper Jay-Z and rock band Linkin Park from their EP Collision Course (2004). It was released as a single on December 13, 2004, by Warner Bros., Machine Shop, Def Jam, and Roc-A-Fella Records. The song is a mash-up that fuses rock and hip hop, combining lyrics from "Numb" by Linkin Park and "Encore" by Jay-Z, both released in 2003.

The only single released from the EP, the track went on to reach number 20 on the Billboard Hot 100. Billboard also placed the single at number 93 on their Billboard Year-End Hot 100 singles of 2005 chart. Outside the United States, the single peaked at number 14 in the United Kingdom, number five in France and the Netherlands and spent three weeks at number one in Ireland. The song was later included on the compilation Papercuts (Singles Collection 2000–2023) released in 2024.

In June 2024, "Numb/Encore" became the third song by both artists to surpass 1 billion streams on Spotify.

== Background ==
Before Mike Shinoda formed Linkin Park in 1996, he was an experimental musician who enjoyed combining songs by Jay-Z with tracks recorded by the Smashing Pumpkins, Nine Inch Nails, and others. A couple of years later, Jay-Z had a similar idea after hearing similar mash-ups by Danger Mouse and Cheap Cologne. He contacted Shinoda and the other members of Linkin Park, suggesting that they would work on some material together. Linkin Park's first two albums – Hybrid Theory and Meteora – had both been worldwide successes, and Jay-Z felt he could work with the band. Shinoda produced three mash-ups based on Jay-Z's The Black Album before responding by email.

Shinoda and Jay-Z continued to correspond by email but eventually met in person to discuss plans. Initially the idea was to create several mash-ups for a new show premiering on MTV called MTV Ultimate Mash-Ups in 2004. However, instead of simply reconfiguring the tracks, the two artists decided to enter the studio and re-record the raps on top of Shinoda's songs. Some of the musical elements were also altered to create an alternative sound. Both Linkin Park and Jay-Z found the session so rewarding that they believed the international audience deserved to hear the results. The songs were performed at Roxy Theatre in West Hollywood in July 2004.

"Numb/Encore" was released as a single in November that year. The song – one of six collaborations on the EP – combined the Jay-Z song "Encore" (taken from his 2003 album The Black Album) and the Linkin Park song "Numb" (taken from their 2003 album Meteora). The released version also contained background vocals from Kanye West that were recorded for the original release.

The official music video was directed by Kimo Proudfoot. It features a mix of Linkin Park and Jay-Z's performance of the song at The Roxy and behind the scenes footage, which was in black and white. The performance and most of the scenes can be found on the Collision Course DVD. However, the music video is not entirely available on the DVD.

== Commercial performance ==
In the United States, "Numb/Encore" peaked at number 20 on the Billboard Hot 100, where "Numb" had charted higher at number 11. However, "Numb/Encore" did not manage to have as much airplay on modern rock stations as "Numb" did. As of June 2014, the song has sold 2.078 million copies in the US.

In the United Kingdom, "Numb/Encore" achieved the record for the longest stay in the top 20 without ever reaching the top 10. Despite only peaking at number 14 – the same peak that "Numb" had achieved 15 months earlier – the song has managed to spend 45 (Note: The Official Charts Company states that the single has spent 45 weeks in the top 75.) weeks in the top 100, 13 of them in the top 20.The former record has been beaten by Jason Mraz's "I'm Yours", which spent 60 weeks in the top 100. It has since sold over 1,800,000 copies and been certified 3× platinum.

"Numb/Encore" won Best Rap/Sung Collaboration at the Grammy Awards of 2006. The show featured a performance of the song, during which Paul McCartney made a surprise appearance and came onto the stage to perform a duet with Chester Bennington of the Beatles' song "Yesterday". "Yesterday" replaced "Numb" after the first rap verse of the mash-up.

== Track listing ==
CD single
| No. | Title | Writer(s) | Length |
|---|---|---|---|
| 1. | "Numb/Encore" (Explicit) | Shawn Carter; Brad Delson; Chester Bennington; Dave Farrell; Joe Hahn; Kanye West; Mike Shinoda; Rob Bourdon | 3:27 |
| 2. | "Numb/Encore" (Instrumental) | Brad Delson; Mike Shinoda | 3:26 |
| Total length: | | | 6:53 |

MTV Ultimate Mashups Presents: Numb / Encore – iTunes EP
| No. | Title | Length |
|---|---|---|
| 1. | "Numb/Encore" (Explicit) | 3:25 |
| 2. | "Numb/Encore" (Clean) | 3:25 |
| 3. | "Numb/Encore" (Instrumental) | 3:27 |
| 4. | "Numb/Encore" (Explicit Acapella) | 3:19 |
| 5. | "Numb/Encore" (Clean Acapella) | 3:19 |
| 6. | "Numb/Encore" (Bonus Beat) | 1:42 |
| Total length: | | 18:40 |

== Charts ==
=== Weekly ===
2004–2005 weekly chart performance for "Numb/Encore"
| Chart (2004–2005) | Peak position |
|---|---|
| Australia (ARIA) | 3 |
| Austria (Ö3 Austria Top 40) | 3 |
| Belgium (Ultratop 50 Flanders) | 7 |
| Belgium (Ultratop 50 Wallonia) | 4 |
| Canada CHR/Pop Top 30 (Radio & Records) | 18 |
| Czech Republic (IFPI) | 5 |
| Denmark (Tracklisten) | 6 |
| Europe (Eurochart Hot 100) | 1 |
| France (SNEP) | 5 |
| Germany (GfK) | 4 |
| Hungary (Single Top 40) | 4 |
| Ireland (IRMA) | 1 |
| Netherlands (Dutch Top 40) | 5 |
| Netherlands (Single Top 100) | 5 |
| Norway (VG-lista) | 2 |
| Scotland Singles (Official Charts) | 16 |
| Spain (Promusicae) | 34 |
| Sweden (Sverigetopplistan) | 5 |
| Switzerland (Schweizer Hitparade) | 10 |
| UK Singles (Official Charts) | 14 |
| UK Hip Hop/R&B (Official Charts) | 1 |
| US Billboard Hot 100 | 20 |
| US Pop Airplay (Billboard) | 12 |
| US Hot R&B/Hip-Hop Songs (Billboard) | 94 |
| US Rhythmic Airplay (Billboard) | 25 |

2017 weekly chart performance for "Numb/Encore"
| Chart (2017) | Peak position |
|---|---|
| US Hot Rock & Alternative Songs (Billboard) | 17 |

=== Year-end charts ===
2004 year-end chart performance for "Numb/Encore"
| Chart (2004) | Position |
|---|---|
| UK Singles (OCC) | 162 |

2005 year-end chart performance for "Numb/Encore"
| Chart (2005) | Position |
|---|---|
| Australia (ARIA) | 30 |
| Austria (Ö3 Austria Top 40) | 8 |
| Belgium (Ultratop 50 Flanders) | 35 |
| Belgium (Ultratop 50 Wallonia) | 28 |
| Brazil (Crowley) | 24 |
| France (SNEP) | 77 |
| Germany (Media Control GfK) | 13 |
| Ireland (IRMA) | 15 |
| Netherlands (Dutch Top 40) | 55 |
| Netherlands (Single Top 100) | 49 |
| Romania (Romanian Top 100) | 36 |
| Russia Airplay (TopHit) | 78 |
| Sweden (Hitlistan) | 48 |
| Switzerland (Schweizer Hitparade) | 53 |
| UK Singles (OCC) | 81 |
| US Billboard Hot 100 | 93 |

2006 year-end chart performance for "Numb/Encore"
| Chart (2006) | Position |
|---|---|
| UK Singles (OCC) | 96 |

2007 year-end chart performance for "Numb/Encore"
| Chart (2007) | Position |
|---|---|
| UK Singles (OCC) | 133 |

2008 year-end chart performance for "Numb/Encore"
| Chart (2008) | Position |
|---|---|
| UK Singles (OCC) | 152 |

== Certifications ==
Certifications for "Numb/Encore"
| Region | Certification | Certified units/sales |
|---|---|---|
| Australia (ARIA) | Platinum | 70,000^{^} |
| Austria (IFPI Austria) | Gold | 15,000^{*} |
| Canada (Music Canada) | Gold | 10,000^{*} |
| Denmark (IFPI Danmark) | Platinum | 90,000^{‡} |
| Germany (BVMI) | 2× Platinum | 600,000^{‡} |
| Italy (FIMI) | Platinum | 50,000^{‡} |
| Japan (RIAJ) Full-length ringtone | Gold | 100,000^{*} |
| New Zealand (RMNZ) | 4× Platinum | 120,000^{‡} |
| Spain (Promusicae) | Gold | 30,000^{‡} |
| Sweden (GLF) | Gold | 10,000^{^} |
| United Kingdom (BPI) | 4× Platinum | 2,400,000^{‡} |
| United States (RIAA) | 3× Platinum | 3,000,000^{‡} |
Streaming
| Denmark (IFPI Danmark) | Gold | 1,300,000^{†} |
^{*} Sales figures based on certification alone.^{^} Shipments figures based on certification alone.^{‡} Sales+streaming figures based on certification alone.^{†} Streaming-only figures based on certification alone.
