= Breaking the Habit (song) =

Single by Linkin Park

from the album Meteora
- B-side: "Crawling" (live); "Session"
- Released: June 14, 2004
- Genre: Alternative rock; electronic rock; nu metal
- Length: 3:16
- Label: Warner Bros.
- Songwriter: Mike Shinoda (Credited to Linkin Park)^{1}
- Producers: Don Gilmore; Linkin Park

Linkin Park singles chronology
"From the Inside" (2004)	"Breaking the Habit" (2004)	"Numb/Encore" (2004)

Music video
- "Breaking the Habit" on YouTube

"Breaking the Habit" is a song by American rock band Linkin Park. It is the ninth track from their second studio album, Meteora (2003), and was released as the fifth and final single from the album. The song was a hit and it became the fifth consecutive single from Meteora to reach number one on the Billboard Modern Rock Tracks chart, a feat unmatched by any other artist in the history of that chart. It was also the third single from the album to reach number one on the Mainstream Rock Tracks chart. The song also peaked at number 20 on the Billboard Hot 100, and was certified Gold by the RIAA. The song was also successful in many other countries, except in the UK where it became their first single to chart outside of the top thirty, faring only better than their previous single "From the Inside" which failed to chart. On September 4, 2012, "Breaking the Habit", "Shadow of the Day", "New Divide", and "Burn It Down" were released in the "Linkin Park Pack 02" as downloadable content for the music rhythm video game, Rock Band 3.

== Background ==
"Breaking the Habit" has been described as an alternative rock, electronic rock and nu metal song, featuring an electronica-influenced opening, live strings, and guitar. It is a departure from their previous rap rock performances as no distorted guitar riffs are included nor are there any rapping vocals from Mike Shinoda, a style they would further explore on their later albums.

A common misconception about the song is that it was written by lead singer Chester Bennington due to his struggles with substance abuse. Band member Mike Shinoda began composing the song before he met Bennington. In the album notes, it was said that the song was originally going to be an instrumental track lasting a little over three and a half minutes, but Shinoda was convinced by the band to change it. The instrumental was later released on the Underground 9.0 Fan Club as a demo track titled "Drawing".

The concept for the song came from Shinoda having a lyrical idea of an emotion he had been trying to express for 5 to 6 years before the production of Meteora. To him, the lyrics had sounded wrong until listening to the "Drawing" demo one night and they fell together. He showed the lyrics he wrote to Bennington, who read them and teared up, relating to the words to a point where he had difficulty performing the song live for almost a year after the release of Meteora; the band would eventually perform it live for the first time at the 2003 Smokeout Festival.

An original 2002 demo of this song with different lyrics and Shinoda on lead vocals appears on LP Underground XIV.

== Music video ==
The music video for "Breaking the Habit" was animated by Gonzo; it was directed by Joe Hahn and co-produced by Eric Calderon. It uses an anime stylization which was supervised by Kazuto Nakazawa, who had previously directed the animated segment of Quentin Tarantino's Kill Bill: Volume 1 among other things. The video was shot of the band performing the song and was later rotoscoped. The video has gone on to be a favorite amongst MTV viewers, going as far as winning the 2004 MTV VMA Viewer's Choice Award.

As the video begins, a deceased man is shown lying on a car's roof. The surrounding area has been taped off and is littered with investigating police officers as well as onlookers. The video cuts to another character, a girl who breaks a mirror, then writes "I'm nothing" onto a sheet of paper. She picks up a shard of glass, clenches it in her hand, and smears her blood on the note. Throughout the different scenes, a wisp of smoke meanders around the characters as their stories play out, and the human face of Chester Bennington singing the song flashes various times. Another character is a young woman throwing tomatoes at a man. At a point, the ubiquitous smoke drifts over the deceased man's body and enters his mouth, and the video begins to seemingly rewind itself, the woman throwing tomatoes at the man who is her husband or boyfriend, is shown coming home to see the man with another woman in bed suggesting they just had sex. The body of the deceased man begins to rise, falling in reverse, towards the roof of a tall building. It is revealed that the body is that of Chester, who had apparently fallen to his death. Upon landing on the roof, he joins with the rest of the band in performing the remainder of the song.

There is also a second music video, titled "Breaking the Habit (05.28.04 3:37 PM)", showing the band in their studio performing the song. The video was directed by Kimo Proudfoot and is available on the Breaking the Habit DVD.

=== iTunes ===
The video for "Breaking the Habit" is available on iTunes, along with a live video version of the video. The live video was taken from the Road to Revolution: Live at Milton Keynes DVD concert.

== Reception ==
“Breaking the Habit” has been ranked among the best Linkin Park songs by Billboard (6th), Stereogum (2nd), and The Independent.

== Live performances ==
"Breaking the Habit" was not initially performed in the tour for Meteora, until it received a full performance on November 15, 2003, in San Bernardino. Since then, it has found itself in the majority of their concerts. From its debut up until the end of the tour cycle for the band's 3rd album, Minutes to Midnight, "Breaking the Habit" was played with a piano intro, where the first verse and chorus were played, and after that, the actual song would start. "Breaking the Habit" is also sometimes played live with an extended outro consisting of an a cappella performance of the chorus. After Linkin Park's 'Concert for the Philippines' on January 11, 2014, "Breaking the Habit" was dropped from the band's setlist. It would not be played live again until May 17, 2015, at Rock on the Range in Columbus, Ohio.

== Track listing ==
All tracks are written by Linkin Park.

No.	Title	Length
1.	"Breaking the Habit"	3:16
2.	"Crawling" (Live)	3:30
3.	"Breaking the Habit" (Video)	3:16

== Personnel ==
Linkin Park

- Chester Bennington – lead vocals
- Rob Bourdon – drums
- Brad Delson – guitar
- Joe Hahn – turntables, samples
- Dave "Phoenix" Farrell – bass guitar
- Mike Shinoda – keyboards, strings arrangement, samples

Additional musicians

- Joel Derouin, Charlie Bisharat, Alyssa Park, Sara Parkins, Michelle Richards, Mark Robertson – violins
- Evan Wilson, Bob Becker – violas
- Larry Corbett, Dan Smith – cellos
- David Campbell – strings arrangement

== Charts ==
=== Weekly charts ===
2004 weekly chart performance for "Breaking the Habit"
Chart (2004)	Peak position
Australia (ARIA)	23
Austria (Ö3 Austria Top 40)	43
Canada CHR/Pop Top 30 (Radio & Records)	4
Canada Rock Top 30 (Radio & Records)	2
Croatia (HRT)	7
Czech Republic (IFPI)	4
France (SNEP)	27
Germany (GfK)	25
Hungary (Single Top 40)	2
Ireland (IRMA)	46
Netherlands (Dutch Top 40)	19
Netherlands (Single Top 100)	41
New Zealand (Recorded Music NZ)	27
Scottish Singles Sales (Official Charts)	41
Switzerland (Schweizer Hitparade)	56
UK Singles (Official Charts)	39
UK Rock & Metal (Official Charts)	3
US Billboard Hot 100	20
US Adult Pop Airplay (Billboard)	25
US Alternative Airplay (Billboard)	1
US Mainstream Rock Airplay (Billboard)	1
US Pop Airplay (Billboard)	15

2017 weekly chart performance for "Breaking the Habit"
Chart (2017)	Peak position
Czech Republic Singles Digital (ČNS IFPI)	69
Slovakia Singles Digital (ČNS IFPI)	99
US Hot Rock & Alternative Songs (Billboard)	12

=== Year-end charts ===
2004 year-end chart performance for "Breaking the Habit"
Chart (2004)	Position
Brazil (Crowley)	24
US Billboard Hot 100	79
US Adult Top 40 (Billboard)	85
US Mainstream Rock Tracks (Billboard)	17
US Mainstream Top 40 (Billboard)	75
US Modern Rock Tracks (Billboard)	8

2005 year-end chart performance for "Breaking the Habit"
Chart (2005)	Position
Brazil (Crowley)	80

== Certifications ==
Certifications for "Breaking the Habit"
Region	Certification	Certified units/sales
Denmark (IFPI Danmark)	Gold	45,000^{‡}
Germany (BVMI)	Platinum	300,000^{‡}
Italy (FIMI)	Gold	50,000^{‡}
New Zealand (RMNZ)	Platinum	30,000^{‡}
United Kingdom (BPI)	Platinum	600,000^{‡}
United States (RIAA)	Gold	500,000^{‡}
^{‡} Sales+streaming figures based on certification alone.
