= Numb (Linkin Park song) =

2003 single by Linkin Park

Single by Linkin Park

from the album Meteora
- B-side: "From the Inside" (Live); "Easier to Run" (Live)
- Released: September 8, 2003
- Studio: NRG Recording Studios (Los Angeles, CA)
- Genre: Nu metal; alternative rock; emo; pop rock
- Length: 3:07
- Label: Warner Bros.
- Songwriter: Linkin Park
- Producers: Don Gilmore; Linkin Park

Linkin Park singles chronology
"Faint" (2003)	"Numb" (2003)	"From the Inside" (2004)

Audio sample
- file; help

Music video
- "Numb" on YouTube

"Numb" is a song by American rock band Linkin Park. It was released as the third single from their second studio album, Meteora (2003), and is the closing track on the album. One of Linkin Park's most well-known and critically acclaimed songs, "Numb" topped the US Billboard Modern Rock Tracks chart for 12 weeks in 2003 and 2004. The song also spent three weeks atop the Billboard Mainstream Rock Tracks chart and peaked at number 11 on the Billboard Hot 100.

The song was remixed as "Numb/Encore", a collaboration between the band and American rapper Jay-Z. It was a massive hit for both artists that was featured on the extended play Collision Course and earned them the Grammy Award for Best Rap/Sung Collaboration. "Numb" was ranked number 95 on Rhapsody's list of the "Top 100 Tracks of the Decade". On March 15, 2022, "Numb" became the second song by the band after "In the End" to surpass 1 billion streams on Spotify. "Numb" has since been certified 4x Platinum in their home country by the RIAA.

== Music video ==
Directed by band member Joe Hahn, the "Numb" music video was filmed in June 2003 in Prague in the Czech Republic and features scenes in Johannes Kepler Grammar School (Gymnázium Jana Keplera), and the famed Charles Bridge. The band's performance section was filmed afterwards in the First Congregational Church of Los Angeles, due to vocalist Chester Bennington suffering from severe abdominal and back pains at the time. The final video was released alongside the single in early September 2003.

The video's plot follows a day in the life of an outcast teenage girl, portrayed by Briana Evigan, interspersed with scenes of Linkin Park performing the song in a cathedral. The girl, an aspiring artist, is shunned and ridiculed by her mother, teachers, and peers. She is shown with self-inflicted cut marks on her arms that spell out "NUMB". At the song's climax, she throws paint at a canvas in anger, then runs into the cathedral that the band was performing the song in as if she heard them, only to find that they have disappeared. In November 2018, "Numb" became Linkin Park's first music video to reach over one billion views on their YouTube channel as well as the first song released in the 2000s to do so. In March 2023, the video was remastered in 4K resolution. In June 2023, "Numb" became the first song by the band to surpass two billion views, and currently holds the title of the most viewed rock video on YouTube.

== Critical and commercial performance ==
The track became one of Linkin Park's most critically acclaimed songs, as well as one of their most commercially successful. It peaked at number 11 on the US Billboard Hot 100 on February 24, 2004, spending 3 weeks on top of the Mainstream Rock Tracks chart and 12 weeks on top of the Modern Rock Tracks chart. "Numb" was the 33rd best-performing single on the Billboard Hot 100 during 2004 and was listed at number 15 in the alternative songs decade-end chart. As of June 2014, the song had sold 2,036,000 copies in the US.

The song was also successful in Oceania, peaking at number 10 in Australia and number 13 in New Zealand. "Numb" is Linkin Park's longest-running single in France, spending 23 weeks on the chart, peaking at number 19; it was also successful in Greece, topping the singles chart; however, it only ranked for one week in Italy and on the Belgian Singles Chart. The song re-entered the charts in July 2017 after the death of Chester Bennington, together with "In the End" and the band's new song "Heavy". In late 2023, for the 35th anniversary of Modern Rock Tracks (since renamed Alternative Airplay), Billboard ranked "Numb" as the 59th-biggest hit in the chart's history.

== Track listing ==
All tracks are written by Linkin Park.

Part 1
No.	Title	Length
1.	"Numb"	3:06
2.	"From the Inside" (Live)	2:55
3.	"Numb" (Video)

All tracks are written by Linkin Park.

Part 2
No.	Title	Length
1.	"Numb"	3:06
2.	"Easier to Run" (Live)	3:22
3.	"Faint" (Video)

All tracks are written by Linkin Park.

Australian Maxi single
No.	Title	Length
1.	"Numb"	3:06
2.	"From the Inside" (Live)	2:55
3.	"Easier to Run" (Live)	3:22

== In other media and covers ==
- The song was mistakenly played in the friendly football match between Malta and Slovakia on September 5th, 2014, during which it temporarily replaced the Maltese national anthem.
- In 2017, an online meme mashing up "Numb" with the Seinfeld theme song was released.
- Finnish heavy metal soprano Tarja Turunen covered and recorded the song during a special performance for Wacken Open Air at the Wacken Church in 2016. The song was later released as the first single for her live album Rocking Heels: Live at Metal Church in 2023.
- In 2024, the song was added to the online video game Fortnite, through the Fortnite Festival game mode and as a purchasable jam track.

== Personnel ==
- Chester Bennington – lead vocals
- Mike Shinoda – piano, synthesizers, backing vocals
- Brad Delson – guitar
- Dave "Phoenix" Farrell – bass
- Joe Hahn – turntables, samplers
- Rob Bourdon – drums

== Charts ==
=== Weekly charts ===
2003–2024 weekly chart performance for "Numb"
Chart (2003–2024)	Peak position
Australia (ARIA)	10
Austria (Ö3 Austria Top 40)	8
Belgium (Ultratop 50 Flanders)	48
Belgium (Ultratop 50 Wallonia)	31
Brazil Hot 100 (Billboard)	59
Canada Hot 100 (Billboard)	27
Canada CHR (Nielsen BDS)	9
Canada Digital Songs (Billboard)	7
Croatia International Airplay (HRT)	6
Czech Republic (Radio Top 100)	85
Czech Republic Singles Digital (ČNS IFPI)	3
Finland Download (Latauslista)	9
France (SNEP)	19
Germany (GfK)	13
Global 200 (Billboard)	27
Hungary (Single Top 40)	1
Hungary (Stream Top 40)	15
Italy (FIMI)	18
Ireland (IRMA)	16
Japan Hot 100 (Billboard)	47
Luxembourg (Billboard)	20
Malaysia (RIM)	15
Netherlands (Dutch Top 40 Tipparade)	13
Netherlands (Single Top 100)	75
New Zealand (Recorded Music NZ)	13
Poland (Polish Streaming Top 100)	76
Portugal (AFP)	22
Scottish Singles Sales (Official Charts)	13
Slovakia Singles Digital (ČNS IFPI)	10
Spain (Promusicae)	98
Sweden (Sverigetopplistan)	23
Switzerland (Schweizer Hitparade)	5
UK Singles (Official Charts)	14
UK Rock & Metal (Official Charts)	1
US Billboard Hot 100	11
US Adult Pop Airplay (Billboard)	31
US Alternative Airplay (Billboard)	1
US Mainstream Rock Airplay (Billboard)	1
US Pop Airplay (Billboard)	5
US Hot Rock & Alternative Songs (Billboard)	2

2025 weekly chart performance for "Numb"
Chart (2025)	Peak position
Finland Airplay (Radiosoittolista)	74

2026 weekly chart performance for "Numb"
Chart (2026)	Peak position
Finland Airplay (Radiosoittolista)	89

=== Monthly charts ===
Monthly chart performance for "Numb"
Chart (2024)	Position
Czech Republic (Singles Digitál – Top 100)	11

=== Year-end charts ===
2003 year-end chart performance for "Numb"
Chart (2003)	Position
Australia (ARIA)	87
Germany (Media Control GfK)	92
US Modern Rock Tracks (Billboard)	67

2004 year-end chart performance for "Numb"
Chart (2004)	Position
US Billboard Hot 100	33
US Mainstream Rock Tracks (Billboard)	9
US Mainstream Top 40 (Billboard)	19
US Modern Rock Tracks (Billboard)	2

2017 year-end chart performance for "Numb"
Chart (2017)	Position
Hungary (Single Top 40)	95
US Hot Rock Songs (Billboard)	28

2024 year-end chart performance for "Numb"
Chart (2024)	Position
Global 200 (Billboard)	176
Portugal (AFP)	102

2025 year-end chart performance for "Numb"
Chart (2025)	Position
Austria (Ö3 Austria Top 40)	55
Belgium (Ultratop 50 Flanders)	169
Germany (GfK)	43
Global 200 (Billboard)	65
Switzerland (Schweizer Hitparade)	68

=== Decade-end charts ===
Decade-end chart performance for "Numb"
Chart (2000–2009)	Peak position
US Hot Alternative Songs (Billboard)	15

== Certifications ==
Certifications for "Numb"
Region	Certification	Certified units/sales
Australia (ARIA)	Gold	35,000^{^}
Denmark (IFPI Danmark)	2× Platinum	180,000^{‡}
Germany (BVMI)	7× Gold	1,050,000^{‡}
Italy (FIMI)	3× Platinum	300,000^{‡}
Japan (RIAJ)	Gold	100,000^{*}
New Zealand (RMNZ)	6× Platinum	180,000^{‡}
Portugal (AFP)	6× Platinum	60,000^{‡}
Spain (Promusicae)	2× Platinum	120,000^{‡}
Switzerland (IFPI Switzerland)	Gold	20,000^{^}
United Kingdom (BPI)	4× Platinum	2,400,000^{‡}
United States (RIAA)	4× Platinum	4,000,000^{‡}
Streaming
Denmark (IFPI Danmark)	Gold	900,000^{†}
^{*} Sales figures based on certification alone.^{^} Shipments figures based on certification alone.^{‡} Sales+streaming figures based on certification alone.^{†} Streaming-only figures based on certification alone.

== Release history ==
Release dates and formats for "Numb"
Region	Date	Format(s)	Label(s)	Ref.
United States	September 8, 2003	CD	Warner Bros.	
United States	September 29, 2003	Mainstream rock; active rock; alternative radio	Warner Bros.	
