= Lying from You =

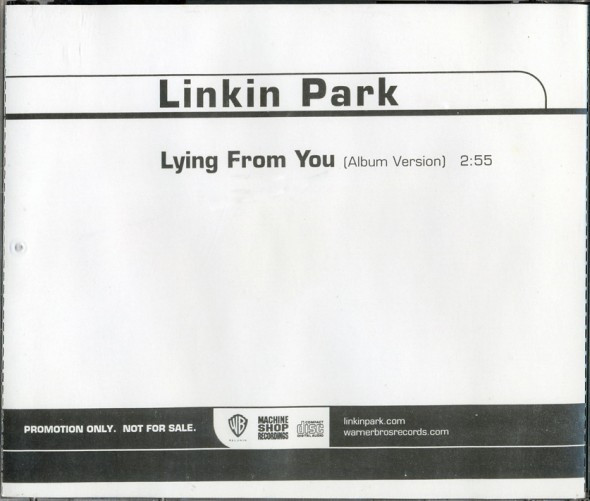

Promotional single by Linkin Park

from the album Meteora
- Released: March 16, 2004
- Genre: Nu metal; rap metal; rap rock
- Length: 2:55
- Label: Warner Bros.
- Songwriter: Linkin Park
- Producers: Don Gilmore; Linkin Park

Music video
- "Lying from You (Live in Texas)" on YouTube

"Lying from You" is a song by American rock band Linkin Park, released on March 16, 2004. It was released as an airplay-only single from their second album, Meteora, which was released on March 25, 2003.

== Song information ==
The song opens up with a viola-influenced keyboard sample that leads into it being looped throughout the verses. It also contains a sample of a car burning out. The song was one of seven Linkin Park songs used in the collaboration between the band and rapper Jay-Z ("Dirt off Your Shoulder/Lying from You") on the mash-up album Collision Course released in November 2004.

In live shows of 2008, "Lying from You" used a new intro, removing all samples from the intro and first half of the first verse.

Interview with Mike Shinoda, March 2003 ShoutWeb:

That song will be impossible for any cover bands to play! Chester just sings too damned hard. I think it's great. I think he did some great stuff on that song. We all are really proud of that song. It's another song with a great keyboard thing that we made, this kind of sample sound at the beginning. It's going to be a really fun song to play live. I could say the same thing for the song that comes after that. Lying from You is about pushing someone away. The title means, making up lies to make another person angry so that they don't want to be around you; which is something that some people do subconsciously in relationships. That's not what my part of the song is about but I know that in a broader sense, when people start feeling negative feelings toward somebody else, just naturally they start doing things to make that person not want to be around them. It's a subliminal reaction. That works with friends. That works with relationships - either way, people do that.

— Mike Shinoda,

== Music video ==
Live footage of the song from Linkin Park's live album Live in Texas has been used as the music video. The live version of the song was used in internet versions of the video. This live video is available on iTunes, along with "Points of Authority".

== Track listing ==
Promo CD-R

| No. | Title | Length |
|---|---|---|
| 1. | "Lying from You" | 2:55 |

== Personnel ==
- Chester Bennington - lead vocals
- Mike Shinoda - rap vocals, keyboards, sampler
- Brad Delson - guitar
- Dave "Phoenix" Farrell - bass
- Joe Hahn - turntables, samplers
- Rob Bourdon - drums

== Chart performance ==
"Lying from You" was released as an airplay-only single from the album. It was released only in the United States in 2004, and in Canada as a live music video with footage from Live in Texas. It became a hit song, reaching number one on the Modern Rock Tracks chart, giving the band their fourth consecutive number one from Meteora. On the Mainstream Rock Tracks chart, it spent five weeks at number two and peaked at number 58 on the Billboard Hot 100 chart.

== Charts ==
| Chart (2004–17) | Peak position |
|---|---|
| Canada Rock Top 30 (Radio & Records) | 18 |
| UK Rock & Metal (Official Charts) | 18 |
| US Billboard Hot 100 | 58 |
| US Alternative Airplay (Billboard) | 1 |
| US Mainstream Rock (Billboard) | 2 |

== Certifications ==
| Region | Certification | Certified units/sales |
|---|---|---|
| New Zealand (RMNZ) | Platinum | 30,000^{‡} |
| United Kingdom (BPI) | Silver | 200,000^{‡} |
^{‡} Sales+streaming figures based on certification alone.

== See also ==
- List of Billboard number-one alternative singles of the 2000s
