= Somewhere I Belong =

2003 single by Linkin Park

Single by Linkin Park

from the album Meteora
- B-side: "Step Up" (live); "My December" (live)
- Released: February 24, 2003
- Recorded: December 2002
- Studio: Soundtrack (New York City)
- Genre: Nu metal; rap metal; alternative rock
- Length: 3:33
- Label: Warner Bros.
- Songwriter: Linkin Park
- Producers: Don Gilmore; Linkin Park

Linkin Park singles chronology
"Pts.OF.Athrty" (2002)	"Somewhere I Belong" (2003)	"Faint" (2003)

Audio sample
- file; help

Music video
- "Somewhere I Belong" on YouTube

"Somewhere I Belong" is a song by American rock band Linkin Park. It was released to US radio on February 24, 2003, as the lead single from their second studio album, Meteora (2003), and is the album's third track. It entered the top ten on several music charts, including the New Zealand Singles Chart, where it peaked at No. 1 in April 2003.

In March 2026, the song became the seventh by the band to surpass one billion streams on Spotify.

== Commercial performance ==
Warner Bros. Records officially released "Somewhere I Belong" to American rock radio formats on February 24, 2003. The song debuted at No. 47 on the US Billboard Hot 100, peaked at No. 32 during its 15th week on the chart, and remained on the listing until its 20th week. It also topped the Billboard Mainstream Rock Tracks and Modern Rock Tracks charts. In Canada, the song reached the top five on the Canadian Singles Chart, peaking at No. 3.

"Somewhere I Belong" was released in Australia and the United Kingdom on March 17, 2003. In New Zealand, the song debuted at number 33 on April 6, 2003, and jumped to number one the following week, becoming Linkin Park's most successful single there. It entered the top 10 in the Czech Republic, Hungary, Ireland, and the United Kingdom, and it was a top-20 success in Australia, Austria, Germany, Italy, the Netherlands, and Sweden. It additionally reached the top 40 in France and Belgium (Flanders and Wallonia).

== Music video ==
The video was directed by the band's turntablist, Joseph Hahn. It presents the band playing the song in front of a fire, with occasional shots of Chester Bennington and Mike Shinoda in front of a waterfall with what appears to be monks around them. It was awarded as Best Rock Video at the 2003 MTV Video Music Awards, and was the first music video broadcast on Fuse TV. MTV's James Montgomery named the video as Linkin Park's fifth best, saying that while the video is "massive", he said "it's the minimal touches that make it one of their all-time best", and called the result a "stirring, powerful piece".

== Track listing ==
CD single

No.	Title	Writer(s)	Length
1.	"Somewhere I Belong"	Linkin Park	3:33
2.	"Step Up" (live)	Shinoda; Hahn; Delson	4:15
3.	"My December" (live)	Shinoda	4:27

7-inch vinyl

No.	Title	Writer(s)	Length
1.	"Somewhere I Belong"	Linkin Park	3:33
2.	"Step Up" (live)	Shinoda; Hahn; Delson	4:15

== Personnel ==
Linkin Park

- Chester Bennington – lead vocals, backwards guitar intro
- Mike Shinoda – rap vocals, rhythm guitar, piano, sampler
- Brad Delson – lead guitar
- Dave "Phoenix" Farrell – bass guitar
- Joe Hahn – turntables, samplers
- Rob Bourdon – drums

Production

- Don Gilmore – producer
- Linkin Park – producer

== Charts ==
=== Weekly charts ===
2003 weekly chart performance for "Somewhere I Belong"
Chart (2003)	Peak position
Australia (ARIA)	13
Austria (Ö3 Austria Top 40)	16
Belgium (Ultratop 50 Flanders)	33
Belgium (Ultratop 50 Wallonia)	23
Canada (Nielsen SoundScan)	3
Croatia (HRT)	4
Czech Republic (IFPI)	7
Europe (Eurochart Hot 100)	10
Finland (Suomen virallinen lista)	14
France (SNEP)	32
Germany (GfK)	12
Hungary (Single Top 40)	3
Ireland (IRMA)	4
Italy (FIMI)	13
Netherlands (Dutch Top 40)	16
Netherlands (Single Top 100)	14
New Zealand (Recorded Music NZ)	1
Norway (VG-lista)	12
Romania (Romanian Top 100)	45
Scottish Singles Sales (Official Charts)	6
Spain (Promusicae)	17
Sweden (Sverigetopplistan)	19
Switzerland (Schweizer Hitparade)	15
UK Singles (Official Charts)	10
UK Rock & Metal (Official Charts)	1
US Billboard Hot 100	32
US Alternative Airplay (Billboard)	1
US Mainstream Rock Airplay (Billboard)	1

2025–2026 weekly chart performance for "Somewhere I Belong"
Chart (2025–2026)	Peak position
Czech Republic Singles Digital (ČNS IFPI)	56
Global 200 (Billboard)	159
Portugal (AFP)	81
Slovakia Singles Digital (ČNS IFPI)	77

=== Year-end charts ===
Year-end chart performance for "Somewhere I Belong"
Chart (2003)	Position
Australia (ARIA)	91
Brazil (Crowley)	34
Ireland (IRMA)	76
Sweden (Hitlistan)	89
UK Singles (OCC)	118
US Mainstream Rock Tracks (Billboard)	8
US Modern Rock Tracks (Billboard)	6

== Certifications ==
Certifications for "Somewhere I Belong"
Region	Certification	Certified units/sales
Australia (ARIA)	Gold	35,000^{^}
Denmark (IFPI Danmark)	Gold	45,000^{‡}
Italy (FIMI)	Gold	25,000^{‡}
New Zealand (RMNZ)	3× Platinum	90,000^{‡}
Portugal (AFP)	2× Platinum	50,000^{‡}
Spain (Promusicae)	Gold	30,000^{‡}
United Kingdom (BPI)	Platinum	600,000^{‡}
^{^} Shipments figures based on certification alone.^{‡} Sales+streaming figures based on certification alone.

== Release history ==
Release dates and formats for "Somewhere I Belong"
Region	Date	Format(s)	Label(s)	Ref.
United States	February 24, 2003	Mainstream rock; active rock; alternative radio	Warner Bros.	
Australia	March 17, 2003	CD	Warner Bros.	
United Kingdom	March 17, 2003	CD	Warner Bros.	
New Zealand	March 31, 2003	CD	Warner Bros.	
