= Joe Hahn =

American musician and DJ (born 1977)

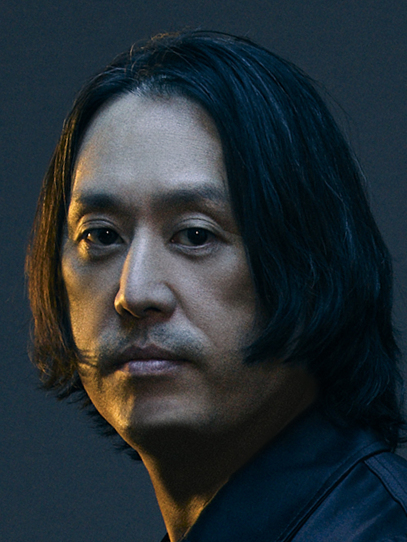
- Hahn in 2024

Background information
- Also known as: Mr. Hahn; Chairman Hahn; Artofficial
- Born: Joseph Hahn; March 15, 1977 (age 49); Dallas, Texas, U.S.
- Origin: Glendale, California, U.S.
- Genres: Nu metal; hip hop; rap rock; electronic; drum and bass; industrial; alternative metal
- Occupations: Musician; DJ; director; visual artist
- Instruments: Turntables; sampler; keyboards; synthesizer
- Years active: 1995-present
- Member of: Linkin Park

Signature
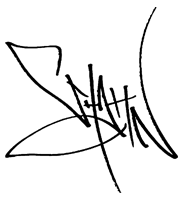

Joseph Hahn (born March 15, 1977), known professionally as Mr. Hahn, is an American musician, DJ, director, and visual artist best known as the DJ and creative director of the rock band Linkin Park, doing the scratching, turntables, sampling, and programming for all eight of Linkin Park's albums. Hahn and bandmate Mike Shinoda are responsible for most of Linkin Park's album artwork. Hahn also directed many of the band's music videos.

== Early life and education ==
Joseph "Joe" Hahn was born the youngest of three children in Dallas; Hahn has two older sisters. Hahn is a second-generation Korean American, and he grew up in a predominantly Mexican neighborhood of Glendale, California. As a child, Hahn played the violin for a few years in school, then also tried out the guitar for a bit.

Hahn graduated from Herbert Hoover High School in Glendale. He then studied at the Art Center College of Design in Pasadena but did not graduate.

== Career ==
Hahn began deejaying in high school, and he studied illustration at the Art Center College of Design in Pasadena, California. In college, he met Mike Shinoda and joined his band Xero, which would release its self-titled demo album in 1997. The band later became known as Hybrid Theory in 1999 with the EP release of the same name as the band, then was changed again into Linkin Park during the recording sessions of Hybrid Theory. Hahn and Shinoda guested in the X-Ecutioners' hit single "It's Goin' Down". Hahn also guest starred in Shinoda's Fort Minor's debut album The Rising Tied on the song "Slip Out the Back".

Hahn was called Chairman Hahn on the back cover of Linkin Park's first remix album Reanimation next to the remixes of the songs "With You" and "Cure for the Itch", titled "Wth>You" and "Kyur4 TH Ich", respectively. Hahn has directed several of Linkin Park's music videos, such as those for "Numb", "From the Inside", "What I've Done", "Somewhere I Belong", "Pts.OF.Athrty", "New Divide", "Bleed It Out" and "Iridescent". He has also directed videos for Alkaline Trio, Static-X, Story of the Year, and Xzibit. In a 2003 interview, he told MTV that film-making was his true passion, and that "doing the music [was] more of an extra thing". He is known to add various dramatic effects to the music videos he directs, such as casting a snake in the video for "Iridescent".

Outside of his work in music, Hahn provided special effects work on The X-Files and the miniseries Frank Herbert's Dune. He also directed a short film called The Seed and acquired the rights to produce a film adaptation of China Miéville's novel King Rat.

Hahn directed the trailer for the video game Medal of Honor, featuring Linkin Park's single "The Catalyst". Hahn also directed the music video for "The Catalyst", which premiered on August 26, 2010, as well as the music video for Linkin Park's "Waiting for the End" and "Burning in the Skies". On April 13, 2011, Mike Shinoda confirmed on his blog that the music video for "Iridescent" would be directed by Hahn.

Hahn became the first Korean American to receive a Grammy when the band won the 2002 award for Best Hard Rock Performance. In November 2011, Hahn designed a helmet of Formula 1 driver Kamui Kobayashi. As of April 2012, Hahn directed a film adaptation of Eric Bogosian's Mall, based on the novel, which stars and is executive produced by Vincent D'Onofrio. The musical score for the album was handled by Linkin Park and Alec Puro of Deadsy for the film.

In 2019, he was a judge in the South Korean JTBC talent show Superband.

In 2022, Hahn composed the original score for the Samurai movie Blade of the 47 Ronin along with co-contributor Alec Puro.

== Discography ==
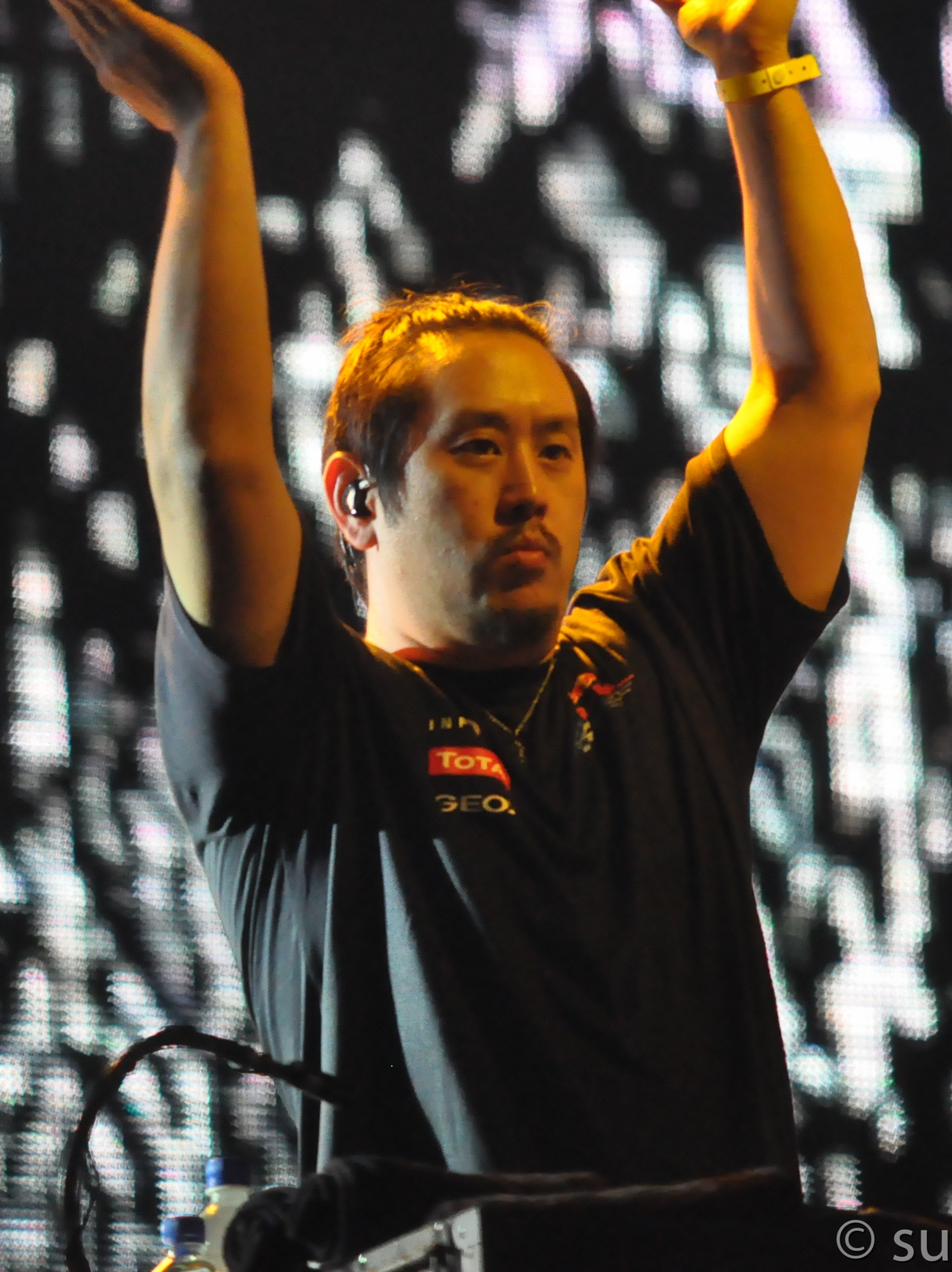
Hahn in 2011

=== With Linkin Park ===
- Hybrid Theory (2000)
- Meteora (2003)
- Minutes to Midnight (2007)
- A Thousand Suns (2010)
- Living Things (2012)
- The Hunting Party (2014)
- One More Light (2017)
- From Zero (2024)

=== Other appearances ===
Year	Track	Artist	Album	Notes
2002	"It's Goin' Down" (with Mike Shinoda)	The X-Ecutioners	Built from Scratch	
2005	"Slip Out the Back"	Fort Minor	The Rising Tied	
2006	"Where'd You Joe?" (Remix of "Where'd You Go")	Fort Minor	Fort Minor Militia EP	Fort Minor Militia exclusive track
2006	"Move On"	Fort Minor	Fort Minor Militia EP	Fort Minor Militia exclusive track
2007	"Bass on the Bottom" (Mr. Hahn and Troublemaker Remix)	Lady Tigra	Bass on the Bottom (Mr. Hahn + Troublemaker Remix)	
2008	"The Young & the Hopeless" (Remixed by Mr. Hahn)	Good Charlotte	Greatest Remixes	
2009	"Vegas Baby"	Uncle Kracker	Happy Hour (5-track Demo)	Outtake from the album, Happy Hour
2010	"Black Rock Shooter" (Remix by Joe Hahn)	Supercell, Hatsune Miku (Vocaloid)	Black Rock Shooter	The Blu-ray release of Black Rock Shooter features a 30-second test short stop motion video as a bonus featuring a remix of "Black Rock Shooter" by Joe Hahn.

== Filmography ==
=== Music videos ===
Year	Title	Band	Notes
2001	"One Step Closer"	Linkin Park	
2001	"Crawling"	Linkin Park	
2001	"Papercut"	Linkin Park	Co-directed with Nathan "Karma" Cox
2001	"In the End"	Linkin Park	
2001	"Points of Authority"	Linkin Park	
2002	"Cold"	Static-X	
2002	"Symphony in X Major" (featuring Dr. Dre)	Xzibit	
2002	"It's Goin' Down"	The X-Ecutioners	Director and guest musician
2002	"Kyur4 TH Ich"	Linkin Park	MTV:Playback and cameo appearance
2003	"Somewhere I Belong"	Linkin Park	
2003	"Faint"	Linkin Park	
2003	"Numb"	Linkin Park	
2004	"Anthem of Our Dying Day"	Story of the Year	
2004	"From the Inside"	Linkin Park	
2004	"Breaking the Habit"	Linkin Park	Co-directed with Kazuto Nakazawa
2005	"Time to Waste"	Alkaline Trio	
2007	"What I've Done"	Linkin Park	
2007	"Bleed It Out"	Linkin Park	
2008	"Shadow of the Day"	Linkin Park	
2008	"Given Up"	Linkin Park	Co-directed with Mark Fiore; credited as Linkin Park
2008	"Leave Out All the Rest"	Linkin Park	
2009	"New Divide"	Linkin Park	
2010	"The Catalyst"	Linkin Park	
2010	"Waiting for the End"	Linkin Park	
2011	"Burning in the Skies"	Linkin Park	
2011	"Iridescent"	Linkin Park	
2011	"Not Alone"	Linkin Park	
2012	"Burn It Down"	Linkin Park	
2013	"A Light That Never Comes"	Linkin Park x Steve Aoki	
2014	"Until It's Gone"	Linkin Park	
2014	"Final Masquerade"	Linkin Park	
2017	"One More Light"	Linkin Park	Co-directed with Mark Fiore
2018	"Waste It on Me"	Steve Aoki featuring BTS	
2024	"The Emptiness Machine"	Linkin Park	
2024	"Over Each Other"	Linkin Park	
2024	"Two Faced"	Linkin Park	
2025	"Up from the Bottom"	Linkin Park	

=== Films ===
Year	Title	Role	Notes
2006	The Seed	Director	Co-directed with Ken Mercado
2014	Mall	Director	Executive produced by Vincent D'Onofrio
2026	Unshatter	Director	About Linkin Park following the death of Chester Bennington
