= Minutes to Midnight World Tour =

2007–08 concert tour by Linkin Park

- World tour by Linkin Park
- Promotional Poster for the tour
- Location: Europe; Oceania; Asia; North America
- Associated album: Minutes to Midnight
- Start date: April 28, 2007
- End date: June 20, 2008
- Legs: 5
- No. of shows: 93
Linkin Park tour chronology
Meteora World Tour (2004)	Minutes to Midnight World Tour (2007–2008)	International Tour (2009)

Minutes to Midnight World Tour was the fourth concert tour by the American rock band Linkin Park. It was launched in support of Linkin Park's third studio album, Minutes to Midnight (2007). Linkin Park Underground the official fan club of the band released a live album as a part of their annual releases named as LP Underground 7.0. It consisted of the live performances of the shows across the 2007-Minutes to Midnight tour.

== Background ==
The tour was announced in April 2007 after the release of the hit single What I've Done. The tour consists of five legs. The first leg consisted of shows in Germany, United Kingdom and United States. The leg under the name Promo Tour began on April 28, 2007 in Berlin, Germany and ended on May 19, 2007 in Irvine, California, where they played at KROQ Weenie Roast y Fiesta. The first leg consisted of ten shows which took place for twenty-two days.

After three days band moved towards Europe and started the "Minutes To Midnight European Tour" which consisted of sixteen shows and a tenure of twenty-four days. Bands like Thirty Seconds to Mars, Blindside and Jane Air, served as special guests for the leg. The band played in various European countries like Denmark, Sweden, Germany, Netherlands, France and Russia. After the European tour the band continued their Projekt Revolution festivals chain in America, as Projekt Revolution 2007. Linkin Park decided to make the tour ostensibly "green" by donating $1 of every ticket to American Forests through their charity Music for Relief and using biodiesel on a majority of their buses, eliminating an estimated 350 tons of carbon emissions. There were also informative booths that showed concert goers how to lower their greenhouse gas emissions. Gerard Way, lead singer of My Chemical Romance was married backstage to Lyn-Z, bassist of Mindless Self Indulgence, after the final show on the Revolution tour.

Later on the band continued the tour after Project Revolution as Australian and New Zealand Tour, Minutes To Midnight Asian Tour, Minutes To Midnight North American Tour and again European tour.

== Set list ==
These set lists are representative of the average set list throughout shows.

1. "Gunshot Intro #1" / "One Step Closer"
2. "Lying from You"
3. "Somewhere I Belong"
4. "No More Sorrow"
5. "Papercut"
6. "Points of Authority"
7. "From the Inside"
8. "Leave Out All the Rest"
9. "Numb"
10. "The Little Things Give You Away"
11. "Breaking the Habit"
12. "Shadow of the Day"
13. "Crawling"
14. "In the End"
15. "Bleed It Out"

Encore

16. "Pushing Me Away" (Piano Version)
17. "What I've Done"
18. "Faint"

== Personnel ==
- Chester Bennington - vocals, rhythm guitar on "Shadow of the Day"
- Mike Shinoda - rap/lead/backing vocals; rhythm guitar, keyboards, piano, samplers
- Brad Delson - lead guitar
- Dave Farrell - bass, backing vocals on "The Little Things Give You Away"; rhythm guitar on "Leave Out All the Rest"
- Joe Hahn - turntables, samplers
- Rob Bourdon - drums, percussion

== Tour dates ==
Date	City	Country	Venue	Tickets sold/Available	Box office
Promo Tour
April 28, 2007	Berlin	Germany	Kesselhaus		
April 30, 2007 (Note: This was a performance for "TV total".)	Cologne	Germany	ProSieben Studios		
May 2, 2007 (Note: This was a performance at "BBC Radio 1")	London	England	BBC Maida Vale Studios		
May 3, 2007	London	England	Astoria		
May 4, 2007 (Note: This was a performance for "Popworld")	London	England	The London Studios		
May 6, 2007 (Note: This show was a part of "Bamboozle Festival".)	East Rutherford	United States	Giants Stadium		
May 11, 2007	New York City	United States	Webster Hall		
May 12, 2007 (Note: This show was a part of "Saturday Night Live (season 32)")	New York City	United States	GE Building (Studio 8H)		
May 18, 2007 (Note: This show was played at "Jimmy Kimmel Live!")	West Hollywood	United States	House of Blues		
May 19, 2007 (Note: This was played at "KROQ Weenie Roast")	Irvine	United States	Verizon Wireless Amphitheatre		
European Tour
May 24, 2007	Copenhagen	Denmark	Forum Copenhagen		
May 25, 2007	Stockholm	Sweden	Stockholm Globe Arena		
May 27, 2007	Hamburg	Germany	Color Line Arena		
May 28, 2007 (Note: This show was a part of "Pinkpop")	Landgraaf	Netherlands	Megaland		
May 30, 2007	Paris	France	Palais Omnisports de Paris-Bercy		
June 1, 2007 (Note: This show was a part of "Rock am Ring".)	Adenau	Germany	Nürburgring		
June 2, 2007 (Note: This show was a part of "Rock im Park".)	Nuremberg	Germany	Volkspark Dutzendteich		
June 5, 2007 (Note: This show was a part of "Tuborg GreenFest".)	Saint Petersburg	Russia	New Arena		
June 6, 2007	Moscow	Russia	Sports Complex Olimpiyskiy		
June 8, 2007 (Note: This show was a part of "Oeiras Alive!")	Lisbon	Portugal	Passeio Marítimo de Algés		
June 9, 2007 (Note: This show was a part of "Download Festival".)	Castle Donington	England	Donington Park		
June 11, 2007	Zürich	Switzerland	Hallenstadion		
June 12, 2007	Prague	Czech Republic	Sazka arena		
June 13, 2007 (Note: Opening for Pearl Jam)	Chorzów	Poland	Stadion Slaski		
June 16, 2007 (Note: This show was a part of "Nova Rock Festival")	Nickelsdorf	Austria	Pannonia Fields II		
Oceanian Tour
October 11, 2007	Auckland	New Zealand	Vector Arena		
October 12, 2007	Auckland	New Zealand	Vector Arena		
October 14, 2007	Melbourne	Australia	Rod Laver Arena		
October 15, 2007	Melbourne	Australia	Rod Laver Arena		
October 16, 2007	Adelaide	Australia	Adelaide Entertainment Centre		
October 18, 2007	Perth	Australia	Burswood Dome		
October 20, 2007	Sydney	Australia	Sydney Entertainment Centre		
October 21, 2007	Sydney	Australia	Sydney Entertainment Centre		
October 22, 2007	Brisbane	Australia	Brisbane Entertainment Centre		
Asian Tour
November 11, 2007	Bangkok	Thailand	Aktive Square		
November 13, 2007	Singapore		Singapore Indoor Stadium		
November 16, 2007	Taipei	Taiwan	Zhongshan Soccer Stadium		
November 18, 2007	Shanghai	China	Hong Kou Stadium		
November 20, 2007	Hong Kong		AsiaWorld–Arena		
November 23, 2007	Saitama	Japan	Saitama Super Arena		
November 24, 2007	Saitama	Japan	Saitama Super Arena		
November 26, 2007	Nagoya	Japan	Nippon Gaishi Hall		
November 27, 2007	Osaka	Japan	Prefectural Gymnasium Naniwa		
November 30, 2007	Seoul	South Korea	Olympic Park		
European Tour
January 16, 2008	Hanover	Germany	TUI Arena		
January 17, 2008	Amnéville	France	Galaxie Amnéville		
January 18, 2008	Basel	Switzerland	St. Jakobshalle		
January 20, 2008	Frankfurt	Germany	Festhalle Frankfurt		
January 21, 2008	Cologne	Germany	Kölnarena		
January 22, 2008	Paris	France	Palais Omnisports de Paris-Bercy		
January 24, 2008	Nottingham	England	Nottingham Arena		
January 25, 2008	Sheffield	England	Sheffield Arena		
January 27, 2008	Manchester	England	Manchester Evening News Arena		
January 28, 2008	London	England	The O2 Arena		
January 29, 2008	London	England	The O2 Arena		
North American Tour
February 12, 2008	Omaha	United States	Qwest Center	9,461 / 9,461 (100%)	$439,937
February 13, 2008	Saint Paul	United States	Xcel Energy Center	12,630 / 15,261	$574,339
February 15, 2008	Columbus	United States	Nationwide Arena		
February 16, 2008	Detroit	United States	Joe Louis Arena	12,505 / 22,290 (54%)	$542,874
February 18, 2008	Manchester	United States	Verizon Wireless Arena		
February 19, 2008	Baltimore	United States	1st Mariner Arena	11,304 / 12,104 (94%)	$517,542
February 21, 2008	New York City	United States	Apple Store (Note: This show was recorded as EP – "iTunes Live from SoHo".)		
February 21, 2008	New York City	United States	Madison Square Garden	18,664 / 18,664 (100%)	$861,188
February 22, 2008	Montreal	Canada	Bell Centre	14,487 / 16,096 (90%)	$808,469
February 23, 2008	London	Canada	John Labatt Centre	9,730 / 9,887 (83%)	$559,952
February 25, 2008	Lexington	United States	Rupp Arena		
February 26, 2008	Nashville	United States	Sommet Center		
February 29, 2008	Oklahoma City	United States	Ford Center		
March 4, 2008	Los Angeles	United States	Staples Center	16,232 / 16,232	$864,062
March 6, 2008	Las Vegas	United States	The Joint @ Hard Rock Hotel		
March 7, 2008	Las Vegas	United States	The Joint @ Hard Rock Hotel		
March 8, 2008	West Valley City	United States	E Center		
March 10, 2008	Sacramento	United States	ARCO Arena		
European Tour
June 5, 2008	Skive	Denmark	Strandtangen		
June 6, 2008 (Note: This show was a part of "Rock in Rio Lisboa")	Lisbon	Portugal	Parque da Bela Vista		
June 7, 2008 (Note: This show was a part of "Festimad")	Madrid	Spain	La Cubierta		
June 10, 2008	Vilnius	Lithuania	Siemens Arena		
June 11, 2008	Riga	Latvia	Arena Riga		
June 13, 2008 (Note: This show was a part of "Provinssi")	Seinajoki	Finland	Törnävä		
June 17, 2008	Brno	Czech Republic	Velodrom		
June 18, 2008	Graz	Austria	Stadthalle		
June 20, 2008 (Note: This show was a part of "Heineken Jammin' Festival")	Venice	Italy	Parco San Giuliano		
