= Projekt Revolution =

Music festival hosted by Linkin Park

- Genre: Alternative metal; nu metal; metalcore; heavy metal; hip-hop; post-hardcore; alternative rock
- Locations: 2002–2008 (North America); 2008 • 2011 (Europe)
- Years active: 2002–2008; 2011
- Founders: Linkin Park
- Website: projektrevolution.com

Projekt Revolution was a music festival hosted by Linkin Park, bringing artists of various genres of music together. Linkin Park started Projekt Revolution in the year 2002 with just one stage. Then, in 2004, they announced the Revolution Stage (Second Stage) where the smaller bands/artists would perform.

== 2002 ==
Projekt Revolution 2002
- National tour by Linkin Park
- Location: U.S., North America
- Start date: January 29, 2002
- End date: February 24, 2002
- No. of shows: 19

2002 brought Linkin Park the idea to plan the Projekt Revolution Tour series, and the series began in that year. They thought it was part festival tour, part concert tour, part national tour. It is the first of the Projekt Revolution Tour Series. For this edition, Linkin Park was supporting their debut album, Hybrid Theory. It was also one of the shortest of the PR Series.

- Main Stage
  - Linkin Park
  - Cypress Hill
  - Adema
  - DJ Z-Trip (Except the first two shows)

Setlist

Linkin Park setlist
1. "With You"
2. "Runaway"
3. "Papercut"
4. "Points of Authority"
5. "Step Up"
6. "Pushing Me Away"
7. "And One"
8. "In the End"
9. "A Place for My Head"
10. "Forgotten"
11. "It's Goin' Down" (X-Ecutioners cover)
12. "Crawling"

Encore

13. "My December"
14. "By Myself"
15. "My Own Summer (Shove It)"(Deftones cover)
16. "One Step Closer"

Date	City	Country	Venue
January 29, 2002	Colorado Springs	United States	World Arena
January 30, 2002	Wichita	United States	Kansas Coliseum
February 1, 2002	Chicago	United States	UIC Pavilion
February 2, 2002	Madison	United States	Alliant Energy Center Memorial Coliseum
February 4, 2002	Detroit	United States	Cobo Arena
February 5, 2002	Dayton	United States	Nutter Center
February 7, 2002	Wilkes-Barre	United States	First Union Arena
February 8, 2002	Uniondale	United States	Nassau Coliseum
February 9, 2002	State College	United States	Bryce Jordan Center
February 11, 2002	Lowell	United States	Tsongas Arena
February 12, 2002	Fairfax	United States	Patriot Center
February 13, 2002	Philadelphia	United States	First Union Center
February 16, 2002	Memphis	United States	Mid-South Coliseum
February 17, 2002	Dallas	United States	Fort Worth Convention Center
February 18, 2002	Oklahoma City	United States	Fairgrounds Arena
February 20, 2002	Phoenix	United States	American West Arena
February 22, 2002	Long Beach	United States	Long Beach Arena
February 23, 2002	San Diego	United States	Cox Arena
February 24, 2002	Las Vegas	United States	Thomas & Mack Center

== 2003 ==
Projekt Revolution 2003
- National tour by Linkin Park
- Location: U.S., North America
- Start date: April 9, 2003
- End date: April 26, 2003
- No. of shows: 16

The 2003 Projekt Revolution Tour, was the shortest of the PR tour series until the 2011 edition. This marked the first of two Projekt Revolutions in support of Linkin Park's second album, Meteora.

- Main Stage
  - Linkin Park
  - Mudvayne
  - Xzibit
  - Blindside
  - Cold (July dates only)
  - Revis (last two dates only)

Setlist

Linkin Park setlist
1. "Don't Stay" (with "Foreword" intro)
2. "Somewhere I Belong"
3. "Lying from You"
4. "Papercut"
5. "Points of Authority"
6. "Runaway"
7. "Faint"
8. "From the Inside"
9. "Hit the Floor"
10. "With You"
11. "By Myself"
12. "P5HNG ME A*WY"
13. "Nobody's Listening"
14. "Crawling"
15. "In the End"

Encore

16. "Easier to Run"
17. "A Place for My Head"
18. "One Step Closer

Date	City	Country	Venue
April 9, 2003	State College	United States	Bryce Jordan Center
April 11, 2003	Evansville	United States	Robert's Stadium
April 12, 2003	Memphis	United States	Mid-South Coliseum
April 13, 2003	New Orleans	United States	Keifer UNO Lakefront Arena
April 15, 2003	El Paso	United States	Don Haskins Center
April 16, 2003	Albuquerque	United States	Tingley Coliseum
April 18, 2003	Phoenix	United States	American West Arena
April 19, 2003	Tucson	United States	Tucson Convention Center
April 21, 2003	West Valley City	United States	E Center
April 22, 2003	Boise	United States	Idaho Centre
April 23, 2003	Spokane	United States	Spokane Arena
April 25, 2003	Billings	United States	Metra Park Arena
April 26, 2003	Rapid City	United States	Rushmore Plaza Civic Center
July 22, 2003	Rochester	United States	Blue Cross Arena (Rescheduled from April 8)
July 29, 2003	Council Bluffs	United States	Mid-America Center (Rescheduled from April 28)
July 30, 2003	Valley Center	United States	Kansas Coliseum (Rescheduled from April 29)

== 2004 ==
Projekt Revolution 2004
- National tour by Linkin Park
- Location: U.S., North America
- Start date: July 23, 2004
- End date: September 5, 2004
- No. of shows: 32

The Projekt Revolution 2004 Tour's Stage has a big bit change. It was divided into the Main Stage and Revolution stages, while its set stays connected. The 2004 PR Tour was the longest of the Projekt Revolution Tour series. This was also Korn's last tour to feature their full original lineup with original guitarist Brian Welch, who leaves the band in February the following year until his return in 2013. Jonathan Davis of Korn would come out on "One Step Closer" to sing the reanimated part of the song.

- Main Stage
  - Linkin Park
  - Korn
  - Snoop Dogg
  - The Used
  - Less Than Jake (except the Dallas show due to one of the band members being sick. Ghostface Killah replaced them on the main stage)
- Revolution Stage
  - Ghostface Killah with P.A.W.N. LASERS / Louis Capet XXVI
  - Funeral for a Friend (except shows from 27 to 30 August due to Reading and Leeds Festivals)
  - downset.
  - M.O.P. (except the first show due to travel plans)
  - Mike V. and The Rats (select shows)
  - No Warning (from 24 July to 13 August)
  - Instruction (from 14 to 28 August)
  - Autopilot Off (from 30 August to 5 September)

Setlist

Linkin Park setlist
1. "Gacela of the Dark Death" intro
2. "Don't Stay"
3. "Lying from You"
4. "Papercut"
5. "Points of Authority" (with elements from "PTS.OF.ATHRTY")
6. "With You"
7. "Runaway"
8. "Hip Hop Medley" (Step Up, Nobody's Listening and It's Goin' Down)
9. "Somewhere I Belong"
10. "Figure.09"
11. "From the Inside"
12. "Breaking the Habit"
13. "Numb"
14. "Faint" (usually with Bert McCracken of The Used providing additional vocals)
15. "In the End"
16. "A Place for My Head"

Encore

17. "Crawling"
18. (with full "KRWLNG" intro)
18. "Wish" (Nine Inch Nails cover)
19. "One Step Closer (with elements from "1STP KLOSR") (usually with Jonathan Davis of Korn providing additional vocals)

Date	City	Country	Venue
July 23, 2004	Cincinnati	United States	Riverbend Music Center
July 24, 2004	Columbus	United States	Germain Amphitheatre
July 26, 2004	Clarkston	United States	DTE Energy Music Theatre
July 27, 2004	Darien	United States	Darien Lake Performing Arts Center
July 29, 2004	Mansfield	United States	Tweeter Center for the Performing Arts
July 30, 2004	Holmdel Township	United States	PNC Bank Arts Center
July 31, 2004	Hartford	United States	Meadows Music Centre
August 2, 2004	Wantagh	United States	Jones Beach Amphitheatre
August 3, 2004	Camden	United States	Tweeter Center at the Waterfront
August 5, 2004	Cuyahoga Falls	United States	Blossom Music Center
August 6, 2004	Noblesville	United States	Verizon Wireless Music Center
August 7, 2004	Tinley Park	United States	Tweeter Center
August 9, 2004	Burgettstown	United States	Post Gazette Pavilion
August 10, 2004	Bristow	United States	Nissan Pavilion Stone Ridge
August 11, 2004	Virginia Beach	United States	Verizon Wireless Amphitheater
August 13, 2004	Atlanta	United States	HiFi Buys Amphitheatre
August 14, 2004	Charlotte	United States	Verizon Wireless Amphitheatre
August 17, 2004	West Palm Beach	United States	Sound Advice Amphitheater
August 18, 2004	Tampa	United States	Tampa Bay Amphitheatre
August 20, 2004	Dallas	United States	Smirnoff Centre
August 21, 2004	Selma	United States	Verizon Wireless Amphitheatre
August 22, 2004	The Woodlands	United States	Cynthia Woods Mitchell Pavilion
August 24, 2004	Bonner Springs	United States	Verizon Wireless Amphitheatre
August 25, 2004	Maryland Heights	United States	UMB Bank Pavilion
August 27, 2004	East Troy	United States	Alpine Valley Music Theatre
August 28, 2004	Somerset	United States	Float-rite Park
August 30, 2004	Greenwood Village	United States	Coors Amphitheater
August 31, 2004	Albuquerque	United States	Journal Pavilion
September 1, 2004	Phoenix	United States	Cricket Pavilion
September 3, 2004	Chula Vista	United States	Coors Amphitheatre
September 4, 2004	San Bernardino	United States	Hyundai Pavilion at Glen Helen
September 5, 2004	Mountain View	United States	Shoreline Amphitheatre

== 2007 ==
Projekt Revolution 2007
- Continental tour by Linkin Park
- Location: North America
- Start date: July 25, 2007
- End date: September 3, 2007
- No. of shows: 29

For 2007, Linkin Park decided to make the tour ostensibly "green" by donating $1 of every ticket to American Forests through their charity Music for Relief and using biodiesel on a majority of their buses, eliminating an estimated 350 tons of carbon emissions. There were also informative booths that showed concert goers how to lower their greenhouse gas emissions.

It was revealed in Revolver magazine that Muse was in the list of bands Linkin Park had picked but couldn't join Projekt Revolution as they had other commitments to deal with.

On August 22, 2007, MySpace.com streamed the concert live, allowing MySpace users to watch the concert for free from their performance at DTE Energy Music Theatre in Clarkston, Michigan. The event was hosted by Matt Pinfield.

Linkin Park sold their performance from the 2007 PR tour at the merchandise booth. Each CD came with a blank disc and a special code that allowed fans to download and burn that specific Linkin Park performance from the venue it was purchased at. The price of purchase for the CD was $11.00. It was sold at every venue except for Jones Beach in Wantagh, NY due to disagreements with the venue wanting a portion of the CD sales.

- Main Stage
  - Linkin Park
  - My Chemical Romance
  - Taking Back Sunday
  - HIM
  - Placebo
  - Julien-K
- Revolution Stage
  - Mindless Self Indulgence
  - Saosin
  - The Bled
  - Styles of Beyond (didn't join the tour until 10 August)
  - Madina Lake (missed shows from 10 to 13 August due to Summer Sonic 2007)
  - Art of Chaos (Winner of the Battle of the Bands selected to 7 dates on the tour from 28 July to 5 August)

Setlist

Linkin Park setlist (Version 1)
1. "One Step Closer"
2. "Lying from You"
3. "Somewhere I Belong"
4. "No More Sorrow"
5. "Papercut"
6. "Points of Authority"
7. "Wake"
8. "Given Up"
9. "Don't Stay"
10. "From the Inside"
11. "Leave Out All the Rest"
12. "Numb"
13. "Pushing Me Away" (Piano version)
14. "Breaking the Habit"
15. "Crawling"
16. "Shadow of the Day"
17. "In the End"
18. "Bleed It Out"

Encore

19. "The Little Things Give You Away"
20. "What I've Done"
21. "Faint"
Linkin Park setlist (Version 2)
1. "Wake"
2. "Given Up"
3. "No More Sorrow"
4. "Lying from You"
5. "Don't Stay"
6. "Somewhere I Belong"
7. "From the Inside"
8. "Papercut"
9. "Points of Authority"
10. "In Pieces"
11. "Shadow of the Day"
12. "Numb"
13. "Pushing Me Away" (Piano version)
14. "Breaking the Habit"
15. "Crawling"
16. "The Little Things Give You Away""Shadow of the Day"
17. "What I've Done"
18. "Faint"

Encore

19. "One Step Closer"
20. "In the End"
21. "Bleed It Out"
Linkin Park setlist (Version 3)
1. "No More Sorrow"
2. "Lying from You"
3. "Somewhere I Belong"
4. "Wake"
5. "Given Up"
6. "From the Inside"
7. "Papercut"
8. "Points of Authority"
9. "Hands Held High"
10. "Numb"
11. "Pushing Me Away" (Piano version)
12. "Breaking the Habit"
13. "Shadow of the Day"
14. "Crawling"
15. "The Little Things Give You Away"
16. "What I've Done"
17. "In the End"
18. "One Step Closer"

Encore

19. "Cure for the Itch"
20. "QWERTY"
21. "Bleed It Out"
22. "Faint"
Linkin Park setlist (Version 4)
1. "No More Sorrow"
2. "Lying from You"
3. "Somewhere I Belong"
4. "Wake"
5. "Given Up"
6. "From the Inside"
7. "Don't Stay"
8. "Papercut"
9. "Points of Authority"
10. "Shadow of the Day"
11. "What I've Done"
12. "Numb"
13. "Pushing Me Away" (Piano version)
14. "Hands Held High"
15. "Breaking the Habit"
16. "In the End"
17. "Crawling"
18. "Bleed It Out"

Encore

19. "The Little Things Give You Away"
20. "One Step Closer"
21. "Faint"
Linkin Park setlist (Version 5)
1. "No More Sorrow"
2. "Lying from You"
3. "Somewhere I Belong"
4. "Wake"
5. "Given Up"
6. "From the Inside"
7. "Don't Stay"
8. "Papercut"
9. "Points of Authority"
10. "Numb"
11. "Pushing Me Away" (Piano version)
12. "Shadow of the Day"
13. "Crawling"
14. "Hands Held High"
15. "The Little Things Give You Away"
16. "What I've Done"
17. "In the End"
18. "One Step Closer"

Encore

19. "Breaking the Habit"
20. "Bleed It Out"
21. "Faint"

Date	City	Country	Venue
July 25, 2007	Auburn	United States	White River Amphitheatre
July 27, 2007	Marysville	United States	Sleep Train Amphitheatre
July 28, 2007	San Bernardino	United States	Hyundai Pavilion
July 29, 2007	Mountain View	United States	Shoreline Amphitheatre
July 31, 2007	Chula Vista	United States	Coors Amphitheatre
August 1, 2007	Phoenix	United States	Cricket Pavilion
August 3, 2007	Selma	United States	Verizon Wireless Amphitheater
August 4, 2007	Dallas	United States	Smirnoff Music Centre
August 5, 2007	The Woodlands	United States	The Cynthia Woods Mitchell Pavilion
August 7, 2007	Atlanta	United States	HiFi Buys Amphitheatre
August 8, 2007	Charlotte	United States	Verizon Wireless Amphitheatre
August 10, 2007	West Palm Beach	United States	Sound Advice Amphitheatre
August 11, 2007	Tampa	United States	Ford Amphitheatre
August 13, 2007	Raleigh	United States	Walnut Creek Amphitheatre
August 14, 2007	Virginia Beach	United States	Verizon Wireless Virginia Beach Amphitheater
August 15, 2007	Wantagh	United States	Nikon at Jones Beach Theater
August 17, 2007	Cuyahoga Falls	United States	Blossom Music Center
August 18, 2007	Darien	United States	Darien Lake Performing Arts Center
August 19, 2007	Bristow	United States	Nissan Pavilion
August 21, 2007	Toronto	Canada	Molson Amphitheatre
August 22, 2007	Clarkston	United States	DTE Energy Music Theatre
August 24, 2007	Mansfield	United States	Tweeter Center for the Performing Arts
August 25, 2007	Camden	United States	Tweeter Center at the Waterfront
August 26, 2007	Hartford	United States	New England Dodge Music Center
August 28, 2007	Syracuse	United States	NY State Fair
August 29, 2007	Holmdel	United States	PNC Bank Arts Center
August 31, 2007	Noblesville	United States	Verizon Wireless Music Center
September 1, 2007	Tinley Park	United States	First Midwest Bank Amphitheatre
September 3, 2007	Greenwood Village	United States	Coors Amphitheatre

== 2008 ==
This was the first time the tour was also outside of North America. Their performance in Milton Keynes was announced months beforehand, which made it highly anticipated amongst fans waiting to attend. Jay-Z came out and performed a modified "Numb/Encore" and "Jigga What/Faint" with the band. This show turned out to be the biggest capacity Projekt Revolution to date. Camera operators obtaining interviews revealed intentions for a DVD, which has been confirmed by Mike Shinoda to be a CD/DVD set on November 25, 2008. Shinoda posted on the band's online forum that anyone 18 or older can submit a title for the live CD/DVD which will later be turned into a poll for fans to vote for their favorite. Concerning the release date, Shinoda stated "we will be releasing it in a DVD/CD combo pack as soon as we can get it done".

Europe:

Projekt Revolution 2008 Europe
- Continental tour by Linkin Park
- Location: Europe
- Start date: June 21, 2008
- End date: June 29, 2008
- No. of shows: 4

- June 21, 2008 – Reitstadion Riem, Munich, Germany
  - Linkin Park
  - HIM
  - N*E*R*D
  - The Used
  - The Blackout

Setlist

Linkin Park setlist
1. "One Step Closer"
2. "Lying from You"
3. "Somewhere I Belong"
4. "No More Sorrow"
5. "Papercut"
6. "Points of Authority"
7. "Reading My Eyes"
8. "Wake"
9. "Given Up"
10. "From the Inside"
11. "Leave Out All the Rest"
12. "Numb"
13. "The Little Things Give You Away"
14. "Breaking the Habit"
15. "Crawling"
16. "Shadow of the Day"
17. "In the End"
18. "Bleed It Out"

Encore

19. "Pushing Me Away" (Piano version)
20. "What I've Done"
21. "Faint"
- June 27, 2008 – Waldbühne, Berlin, Germany
  - Linkin Park
  - HIM
  - N*E*R*D
Linkin Park setlist
1. "What I've Done"
2. "Faint"
3. "No More Sorrow"
4. "Wake"
5. "Given Up"
6. "Lying from You"
7. "Don't Stay"
8. "In Pieces"
9. "Somewhere I Belong"
10. "Points of Authority"
11. "Leave Out All the Rest"
12. "Numb"
13. "Shadow of the Day"
14. "Valentine's Day"
15. "Crawling"
16. "In the End"
17. "Bleed It Out"

Encore

18. "Pushing Me Away" (Piano version)
19. "Breaking the Habit"
20. "A Place for My Head"
21. "One Step Closer"
- June 28, 2008 – LTU Arena, Düsseldorf, Germany
  - Linkin Park
  - HIM
  - N*E*R*D
  - The Used
  - The Bravery
  - Innerpartysystem
Linkin Park setlist
1. "No More Sorrow"
2. "Lying from You"
3. "Somewhere I Belong"
4. "Wake"
5. "Given Up"
6. "Papercut"
7. "Points of Authority"
8. "In Pieces"
9. "Numb"
10. "Pushing Me Away" (Piano version)
11. "Breaking the Habit"
12. "Shadow of the Day"
13. "Crawling"
14. "Leave Out All the Rest"
15. "What I've Done"
16. "In the End"
17. "Bleed It Out"

Encore

19. "A Place for My Head"
20. "Faint"
21. "One Step Closer"
- June 29, 2008 – National Bowl, Milton Keynes, England
  - Linkin Park
  - Jay-Z
  - Pendulum
  - N*E*R*D
  - Enter Shikari
  - The Bravery
  - Innerpartysystem

Setlist

Linkin Park setlist
1. "One Step Closer"
2. "From the Inside"
3. "Somewhere I Belong"
4. "No More Sorrow"
5. "Papercut"
6. "Points of Authority"
7. "Wake"
8. "Given Up"
9. "Lying from You"
10. "Hands Held High" (A capella)
11. "Leave Out All the Rest"
12. "Numb"
13. "The Little Things Give You Away"
14. "Breaking the Habit"
15. "Shadow of the Day"
16. "Crawling"
17. "In the End"

First encore

18. "Pushing Me Away" (Piano version)
19. "What I've Done"

Second encore

20. Numb/Encore (With Jay-Z)
21. Jigga What/Faint (With Jay-Z)
22. "Bleed It Out"

US:

Projekt Revolution 2008 North America
- National tour by Linkin Park
- Location: U.S., North America
- Start date: July 16, 2008
- End date: August 24, 2008
- No. of shows: 24

- Main Stage:
  - Linkin Park
  - Chris Cornell (of Soundgarden)
  - The Bravery
  - Busta Rhymes (left the tour – See Controversy during 2008 Tour)
  - Ashes Divide
  - Street Drum Corps (originally opened the Revolution Stage but were moved to the main stage)
- Revolution Stage:
  - Atreyu
  - 10 Years
  - Hawthorne Heights
  - Armor for Sleep

Linkin Park changed the set-lists up a little bit, giving new intros and outros to a few songs and playing "We Made It" every show, until Busta Rhymes left the tour. Chris Cornell also collaborated with the band by singing on "Crawling". Also Chester Bennington performed "Hunger Strike" with Cornell. Street Drum Corps also performed a few songs with the band. On the two dates in Ohio, local band State Your Cause was asked to open the Revolution Stage.

Date	City	Country	Venue
July 16, 2008	Mansfield	United States	Comcast Center for Performing Arts
July 18, 2008	Burgettstown	United States	Post-Gazette Pavilion
July 19, 2008	Camden	United States	Susquehana Bank Center
July 20, 2008	Hartford	United States	New England Dodge Music Center
July 22, 2008	Wantagh	United States	Nikon at Jones Beach Theater
July 23, 2008	Holmdel	United States	PNC Bank Arts Center
July 25, 2008	Raleigh	United States	Time Warner Cable Music Pavilion at Walnut Creek
July 26, 2008	Virginia Beach	United States	Verizon Wireless Virginia Beach Amphitheater
July 27, 2008	Bristow	United States	Nissan Pavilion
July 30, 2008	Charlotte	United States	Charlotte Verizon Wireless Amphitheatre
August 1, 2008	West Palm Beach	United States	Cruzan Amphitheatre
August 2, 2008	Tampa	United States	Ford Amphitheatre
August 3, 2008	Atlanta	United States	Lakewood Amphitheatre
August 7, 2008	Phoenix	United States	Cricket Wireless Pavilion
August 9, 2008	Mountain View	United States	Shoreline Amphitheatre
August 10, 2008	Irvine	United States	Verizon Wireless Amphitheatre
August 12, 2008	Greenwood Village	United States	Fiddler's Green Amphitheatre
August 13, 2008	Bonner Springs	United States	Sandstone Amphitheatre
August 15, 2008	Cincinnati	United States	Riverbend Music Center
August 16, 2008	East Troy	United States	Alpine Valley Music Theatre
August 17, 2008	Noblesville	United States	Verizon Wireless Music Center Indianapolis
August 19, 2008	Cuyahoga Falls	United States	Blossom Music Center
August 21, 2008	St. Louis	United States	Verizon Wireless Amphitheater St. Louis
August 23, 2008	Dallas	United States	Superpages.com Center
August 24, 2008	The Woodlands	United States	Cynthia Woods Mitchell Pavilion

=== Controversy during 2008 tour ===
During the Projekt Revolution Tour of 2008, Busta Rhymes was announced to have left the tour after only eleven days due to "complicated business matters", amidst rumors he had been removed from the lineup after an alleged backstage confrontation with Linkin Park's Mike Shinoda. Shinoda later posted on his blog that he and the rest of his band were disappointed to see Rhymes leave, implying that the rumour was false. Busta actually left the tour due to an argument with his now former label Interscope Records. Since he left the label, he no longer had support to be on the tour.

== 2011 ==
Projekt Revolution 2011
- Continental tour by Linkin Park
- Location: Europe
- Start date: June 16, 2011
- End date: June 25, 2011
- No. of shows: 4

This was the shortest Projekt Revolution to date, with only four shows in Europe. This tour was done by Linkin Park, Dredg and Middle Class Rut.

- June 16, 2011 – Kaisaniemi Park, Helsinki, Finland with Die Antwoord
- June 18, 2011 – Festwiese, Leipzig, Germany with Guano Apes and Anberlin
- June 19, 2011 – Hessentagsarena, Oberursel, Germany with Anberlin and Die Antwoord
- June 25, 2011 – Messegelände München Riem, Munich, Germany with Guano Apes and Anberlin
