= Adelaide Entertainment Centre =

Indoor arena in Adelaide, South Australia

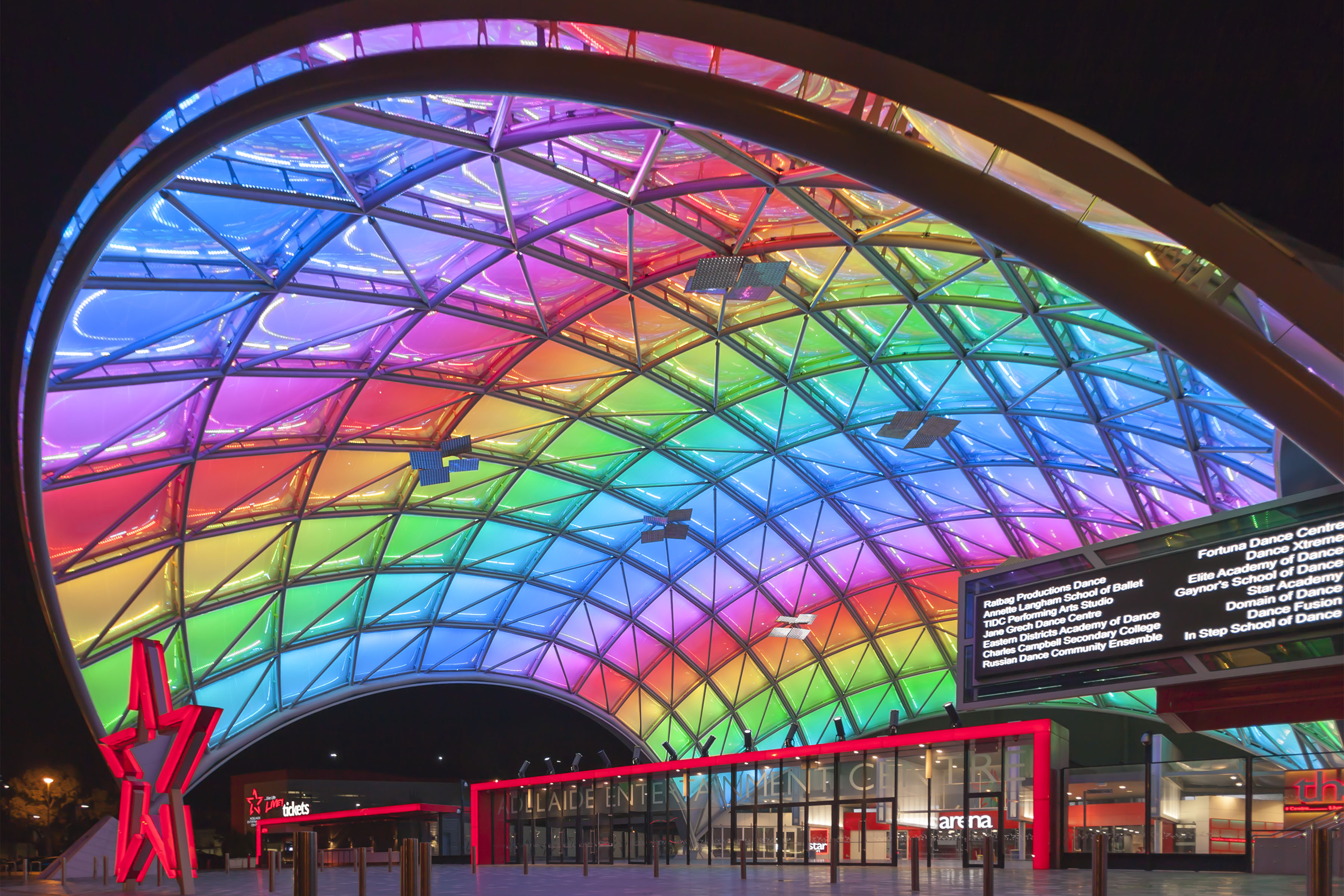
- Exterior of venue at night, showcasing "The Orb" c. 2015
- Interactive map of Adelaide Entertainment Centre
- Address: 98 Port Rd; Adelaide SA 5007; Australia
- Location: Hindmarsh, South Australia
- Coordinates: 34.9080°S 138.5737°E
- Owner: Government of South Australia
- Operator: Adelaide Venue Management Corporation
- Capacity: 11,300 (arena); 10,000 (court sports); 3,000 (theatre)

Construction
- Groundbreaking: 1990
- Opened: 20 July 1991
- Renovated: 2007–2010
- Cost: A$44 million ($83.5 million in 2016 dollars)

Tenants
- Adelaide Thunderbirds (ANZ/NNL) (2010–2013; 2018–present); Adelaide 36ers (NBL) (2019–present)

Website
- Venue Website

The Adelaide Entertainment Centre (AEC) is an indoor arena located in Adelaide. It is used for sporting and entertainment events. It is the principal venue for concerts, events and attractions for audiences between 1,000 and 11,300.

It is located on Port Road in the suburb of Hindmarsh, just north-west of the Adelaide city centre. With modern architecture and acoustics, function rooms and catering, the Adelaide Entertainment Centre provides a live entertainment venue for hundreds of thousands of people each year.

In 2010 the Adelaide Entertainment Centre completed a $52 million redevelopment with a new entry and theatre complex.

== History ==
The AEC was established by the Government of South Australia in response to rising demand from the people of South Australia (primarily Adelaide) for a suitable venue for international and local popular entertainment and sport. The 3,500 capacity Apollo Stadium, which had been Adelaide's primary entertainment and indoor sports venue since 1969, was increasingly considered to be too small to meet this need and by the end of the 1980s many international music acts were bypassing Adelaide (especially in the winter months) on their Australian tours due to the lack of a suitable indoor venue (the only other viable indoor venues in Adelaide were the Adelaide Festival Centre or the Thebarton Theatre, both of which only held 2,000 which was even less than the Apollo's capacity). To meet the demand for a new indoor venue that could hold upwards of 10,000 people, the AEC was announced in late 1989 and would be built at a cost of AU$44 million.

Building for the venue began in early 1990 and involved the excavation of 75,200 tonnes of earth and the pouring of 36,480 tonnes of concrete, the largest concrete pour in South Australia at the time, as well as over 750,000 hours on construction. The Main Arena floor is 65.4 metres by 42.1 metres and the roof height is approximately 20 metres from the Arena floor (approximately the height of a 5-storey building). The clear span of the Arena is 85 metres, the 8 roof trusses weighed a total of 216 tonnes and 980 tonnes of structural steel was used in the construction. The Adelaide Entertainment Centre was officially opened on 20 July 1991 by John Bannon, the then Premier of South Australia.

Before the AEC was built it was generally believed by the people of Adelaide that it would also be the new home of the Adelaide 36ers who played in the National Basketball League as they played their home games at Apollo and a move there when it opened seemed natural as ticket demand for the 36ers was more than twice what the old stadium could hold. This speculation was also fuelled by the success of other teams in the NBL, namely the Brisbane Bullets, Perth Wildcats, and Sydney Kings who had all moved into their respective cities larger Entertainment Centres and were attracting record crowds. However, both the 36ers and their then owner the Basketball Association of South Australia wanted their own venue that would provide a home for basketball in SA, and thus the AU$16 million, 8,000 seat Clipsal Powerhouse (Renamed to Titanium Security Arena, and then to Adelaide Arena in 2019) was opened in 1992.

In 2019, the Adelaide 36ers announced that the Adelaide Entertainment Centre would be the new home of the Adelaide 36ers NBL team. The Adelaide Entertainment Centre has capacity to hold 10,000 Basketball fans.

The South Australian Government assigned responsibility for the management of the AEC to the Grand Prix Board in 1989. In August 1998, the Government established the Adelaide Entertainments Corporation. The first board of directors for the AEC was formally appointed on 9 February 1999. The current Board consists of seven Directors.

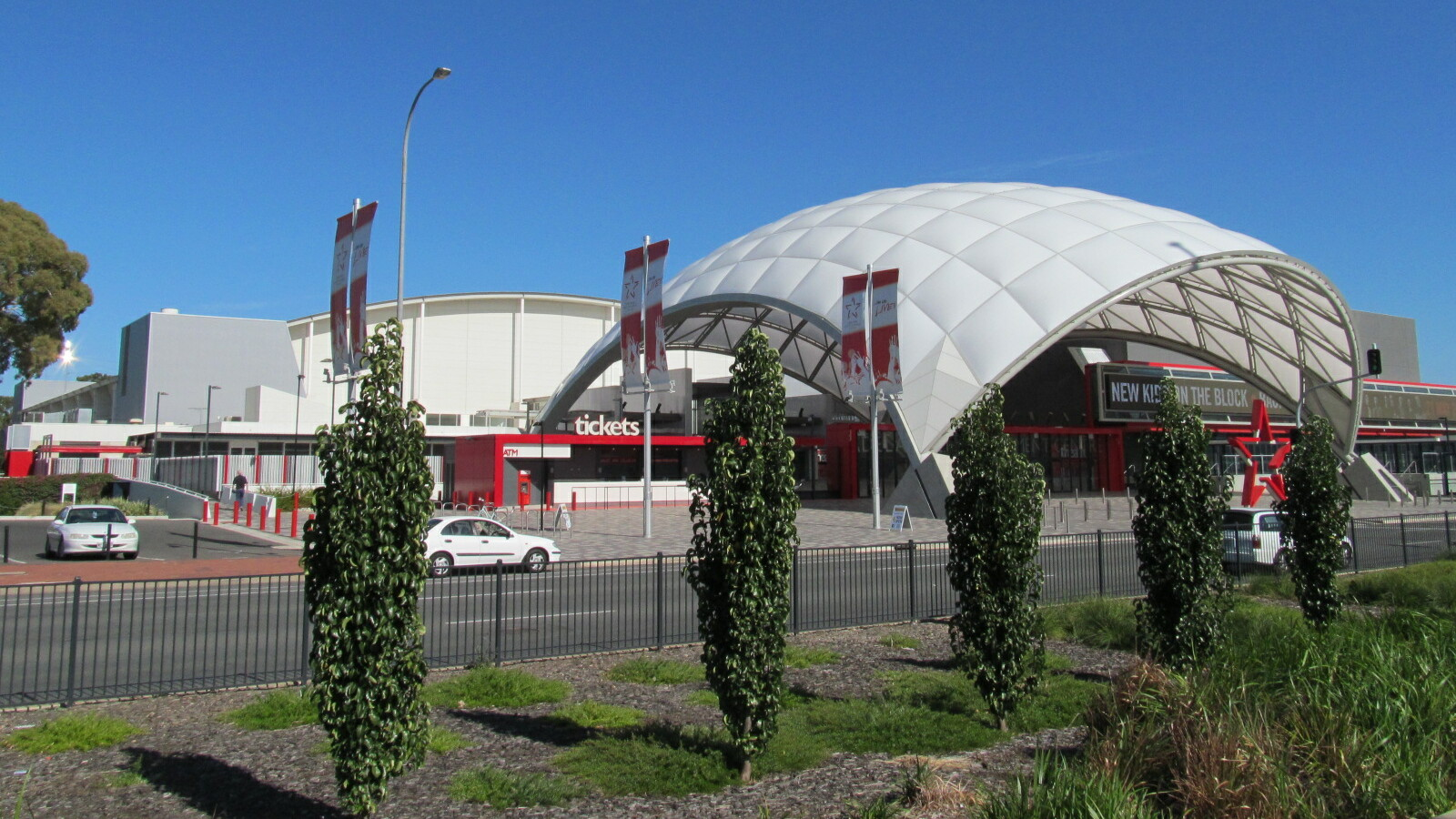
The centre after renovation (2012)

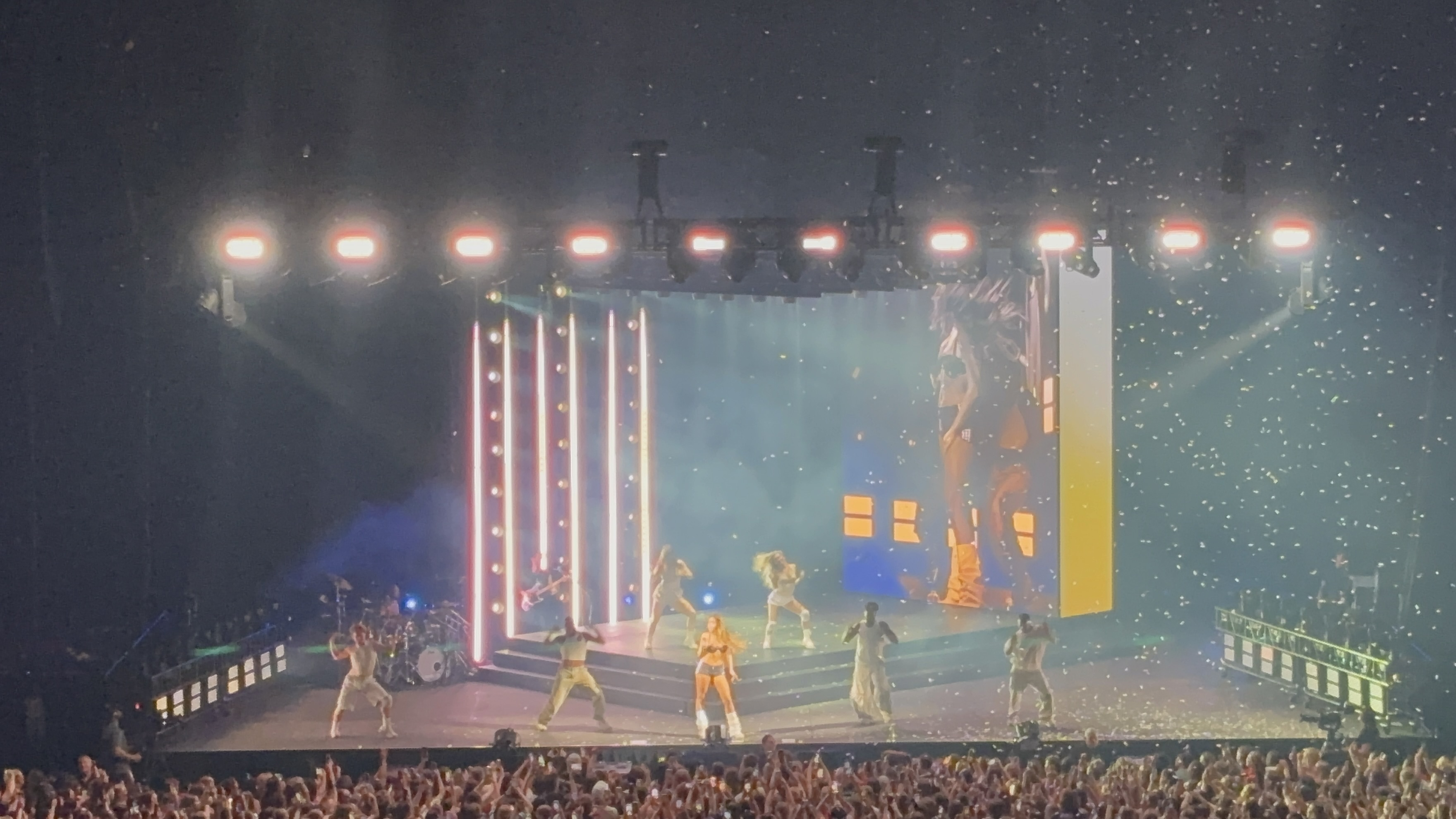
Canadian singer Tate McRae performing at the venue in November 2024.

In 2007, the Rann Government announced plans to renovate the Adelaide Entertainment Centre. The Government released the statement: "The State Government is committed to the vision of creating a vibrant entertainment and media precinct on the Adelaide Entertainment Centre Site". On 6 August 2007, the renovation plans were passed and construction began on the $52 million upgrade. Tourism Minister Jane Lomax-Smith said: "the upgrade comes on the back of a record-breaking last 12 months, with more than 370,000 passing through the centre's doors, and record profits recorded."

The renovation included: major upgrades of the foyer, backstage area and corporate facilities; creation of additional car parking; new staging and curtains; renovation of administration areas; and restoration of the heritage-listed Revelations Chapel for use as a wedding and function venue. In the main arena itself 8,000 new seats were also installed.

The centre not only holds music and cultural events, but hosts the occasional sporting event such as netball, as well as Professional Wrestling with the World Wrestling Entertainment using the venue for the Adelaide leg of their Australian tours since 2004.

Linkin Park played at the arena on 16 October 2007, as part of the Minutes to Midnight Tour. On 12 March 2026, the band will perform a show at the venue as part of their eight-stop tour of Australia and New Zealand.

On 7 November 2010, the centre played host to the ANZ Championship grand final between local team the Adelaide Thunderbirds and the Waikato Bay of Plenty Magic team from New Zealand. The Thunderbirds won the grand final 52–42 in front of 9,300 fans. The Entertainment Centre was chosen over the Thunderbirds home venue of ETSA Park which only holds 3,200 and their former alternate venue, Titanium Security Arena, due to its ability to hold more spectators and because ticket demand was more than the Titanium's 8,000 capacity.

The centre also hosted the opening two games of the 2012 Holden Netball Quad-Series in a double header with Australia taking on England and New Zealand taking on South Africa.

On 14 July 2013, the AEC hosted its second ANZ Championship grand final when the Thunderbirds hosted the Queensland Firebirds. The T-Birds kept their winning record at the venue when they defeated the Firebirds 50–48 in front of 9,000 fans. Since 2018, the Thunderbirds have utilised the Entertainment Centre as an alternate home venue.

Metallica performed here for the first time on 5 April 1993, during their Nowhere Else to Roam tour, then returned on 9 April 1998, as part of their Poor Re-Touring Me Tour, and again for two shows on 15 and 16 November 2010, as part of their World Magnetic Tour.

Kylie Minogue performed here for the first time on 25 and 26 April 2001, during her On A Night Like This. Minogue returned on 30 November and 1 December 2006 as part of her Homecoming Tour. Kylie performed again 18 June 2011 as part of her Aphrodite: Les Folies Tour and 17 March 2015 during her Kiss Me Once Tour. She returned on 11 March 2019, during her Golden Tour. On 18 February 2025, she performed as part of her Tension Tour.

The global superstar Beyoncé performed at the arena for the first time as a solo artist in 2007 during her tour The Beyoncé Experience, then came back in 2009 and 2013.

On 23 July 2007, Irish vocal pop band Westlife held a concert for The Love Tour supporting their album The Love Album.

On 3 April 2010, Lady Gaga performed at the arena as part of her The Monster Ball Tour.

On 20 April 2011, Chris Brown performed at the arena as part of his F.A.M.E. Tour (Chris Brown)

On 4 October 2014, Miley Cyrus performed in the Entertainment Centre during the Bangerz Tour for the second time since her last sold-out show in 2011 during her Gypsy Heart Tour.

On 9 October 2018, Cher performed at the arena as part of her Here We Go Again Tour.

On 28 July 2022, British virtual band Gorillaz performed at the arena as part of their 2022 World Tour and as a part of Illuminate Adelaide.

On 14 November 2022, Dua Lipa performed at the arena as part of her Future Nostalgia Tour.

On 18 October 2023, Paul McCartney performed at the arena for the first show of the Australian leg of his Got Back Tour.

On 11 February 2024, Blink-182 performed at the arena on their reunion tour.

On 17 April 2024, Bring Me the Horizon performed at the arena as part of their Nex_Gen World Tour

After the centre's success, the number of regular plays and musicals decline in 2010s, as the Adelaide Festival Centre opposite the Adelaide Oval took over with musicals such as Chitty Chitty Bang Bang, The Sound of Music and Matilda (shown in 2014, 2016 and 2017).

On 3 August 2024, the AEC's sports attendance record was set when 9,694 fans saw the Adelaide Thunderbirds win their 6th national title defeating the Melbourne Vixens 59-57 in the 2024 Suncorp Super Netball Grand Final.

On 4 September 2024, Iron Maiden performed at the arena as a part of their The Future Past World Tour, and on 11 November 2026, will play there again as part of their Run For Your Lives World Tour.

On 2 January 2026, the Adelaide 36ers set their all time home attendance record when 10,044 fans saw them take on the Sydney Kings.

In October 2027, Nickelback will perform one show at the venue as part of their Everything Under the Sun Tour. It will be the band's first tour of Australia since February 2019.

== Centre features ==
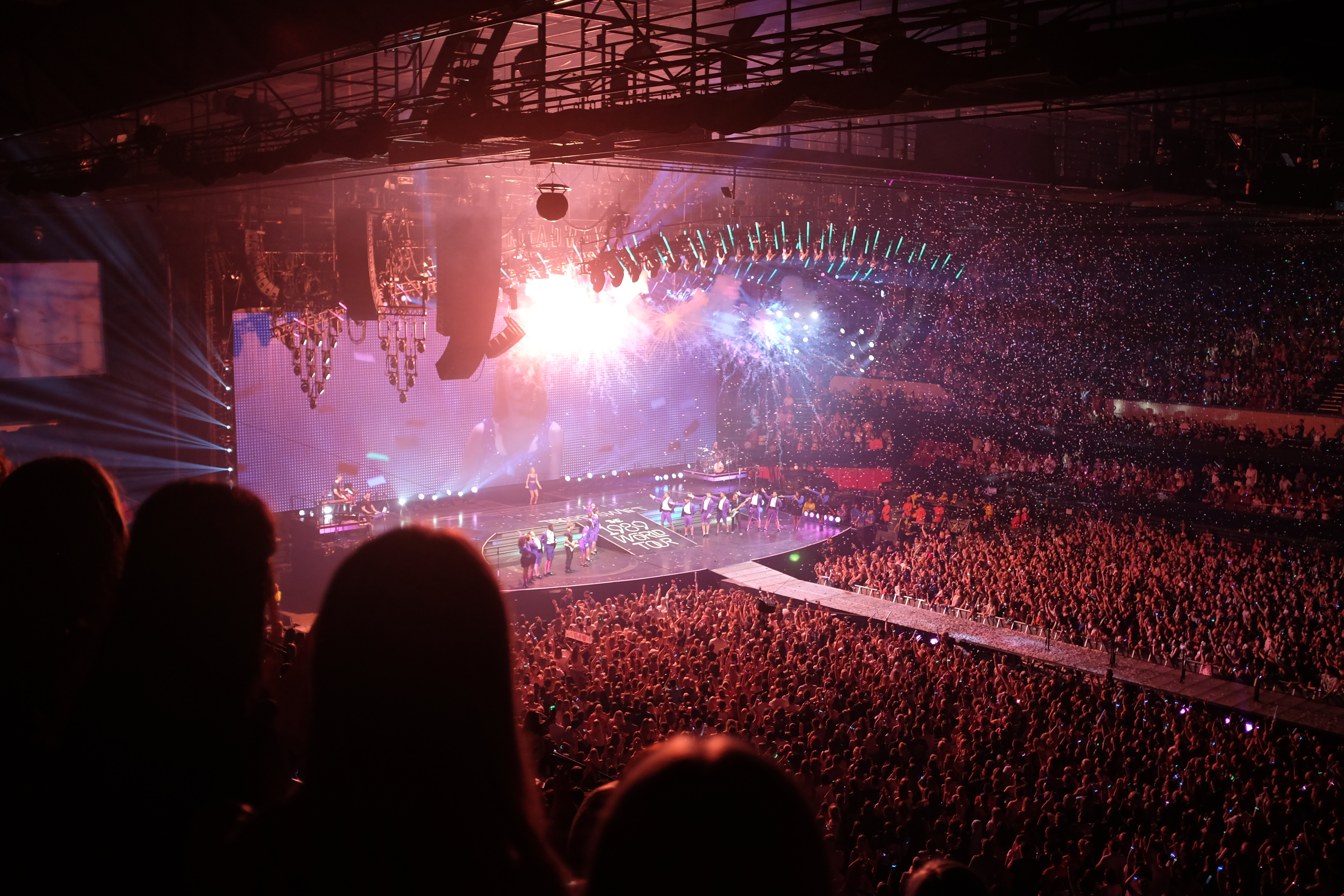
Taylor Swift concert at the Centre in 2015.

The footprint of the site is 28,900 square metres (2.89 ha) (approx 7 acres), and includes a large foyer area, a 2,680-square-metre (28,800 sq ft) event arena, seven function rooms, car parking, logistic facilities and administrative offices. The arena is the largest auditorium in South Australia.

The centre it is capable of operating in several different modes, including an 'intimate' mode (2,000–4,500 patrons), end stage mode (4,500–7,500 patrons) and '360-degree' mode. With a general admission floor and Corporate-level seating, the maximum capacity of the AEC of 11,300, making it the third-largest permanent indoor arena in Australia behind Sydney's Qudos Bank Arena (21,032) and the Brisbane Entertainment Centre (14,500), and the fifth-largest Australian arena behind the Sydney Super Dome (Qudos), Melbourne's Rod Laver Arena (16,200), the Perth Arena (14,856) and the Brisbane Entertainment Centre (both the Rod Laver and Perth arenas are retractable roof venues).

When in Sports Mode, usually for either basketball for the Adelaide 36ers or netball for the Adelaide Thunderbirds or Australian Netball Diamonds, the Centre has a capacity of 10,000. As of 2025, the largest attendance in sports mode was set on August 3, 2024 for the Suncorp Super Netball Grand Final won by the Thunderbirds over the Melbourne Vixens with 9,694 in attendance. The largest 36ers attendance to date was set on January 4, 2025 when 9,588 saw the 36ers defeat Melbourne United.

The AEC has a complete in-house catering operation that provides for audience food and beverage requirements, as well as banquet, function, seminar, tradeshow, corporate suites and backstage requirements. The AEC also provides corporate hospitality in the form of 31 suites that are leased on a 2–5-year basis.

== Functions ==
The Adelaide Entertainment Centre holds various functions throughout the year for corporate clients and private hirers including gala banquets, dinners, breakfasts, conferences, weddings and wedding ceremonies. The Arena can accommodate a banquet for up to 1000 guests.

The AEC is also home to the Revelations Chapel which is heritage listed and non-denominational. This venue can host both wedding ceremonies and functions.

== Car parks ==
The Adelaide Entertainment Centre has more than 1,400 car park spaces available on site for concert-goers. Entry or exit is via Mary Street, Manton Street or Adam Street only. A$18 parking fee applies for event parking.

== Transport ==
A tram service operates from Glenelg via the Adelaide city centre, free of charge to and from the city. A taxi stand is situated on Port Road next to the main entrance of the AEC. Bus stops are located on Port Road and Manton Street (rear of the AEC). The Bowden railway station is located within a minute's walk from the main entrance of the AEC.

Preceding station	Adelaide Metro	Following station
Terminus	Glenelg tram line Limited service	Bonython Park towards Moseley Square or Botanic Gardens

== Ticketing ==
All tickets for concerts or events at the Adelaide Entertainment Centre can be purchased through Ticketek.

== See also ==
- List of indoor arenas in Australia

Adelaide concert venues include:

- Adelaide Festival Centre
- Adelaide Oval
- Adelaide Showgrounds
- Football Park
- Memorial Drive Park
- Thebarton Theatre
- Titanium Security Arena
