= Given Up =

Single by Linkin Park

from the album Minutes to Midnight
- B-side: "Valentine's Day"; (Live from Frankfurt, Germany, Jan. 20 '08); "In Between"; (Live from London, UK, Jan. 29 '08)
- Released: February 17, 2008 (UK); March 3, 2008 (US)
- Recorded: 2007
- Studio: The Mansion, Los Angeles, California
- Genre: Post-hardcore; punk rock; hard rock; heavy metal
- Length: 3:09
- Label: Warner Bros.
- Composer: Linkin Park
- Lyricists: Chester Bennington; Mike Shinoda
- Producers: Rick Rubin; Mike Shinoda

Linkin Park singles chronology
"Shadow of the Day" (2007)	"Given Up" (2008)	"We Made It" (2008)

Music video
- "Given Up" on YouTube

"Given Up" is a song by American rock band Linkin Park. The song was released as the fourth single from their third studio album, Minutes to Midnight. It was released digitally worldwide on February 15, 2008, with the UK single release following in March 2008. The song was not as much of a success as what was expected in the US, although it peaked at number 4 on the US Alternative Airplay chart. Chester Bennington's ability to hold a note (a fry-screamed D5-B4) for 17 seconds (2:27-2:44) is considered the highlight of the song.

== Background ==
"Given Up" made its live debut on April 28, 2007, in Berlin, Germany along with two other singles from the album: "No More Sorrow" and "What I've Done". Live performances of these three songs at the AOL sessions were released on AOL on May 5, 2007. The performance of the song is available on the "Bleed It Out" single.

"Given Up" is one of the heaviest songs on the album. It notably features a seventeen-second-long scream by Chester Bennington before the final chorus, as well as a steady guitar riff for the choruses of the song. The scream was frequently split into two, seven-and-a-half-second long screams when performed live allowing Bennington to catch his breath, although he has occasionally completed the full scream in various live performances.

Speaking in a 2020 interview with Vulture.com, Mike Shinoda would explain how the 17-second scream came to be:

"One of our most notorious moments is this big scream on the bridge of "Given Up". I think it's a 17- or 18-second-long scream. I had organized the song, and Chester hadn't gotten familiar with the structure of the song when he was singing it. I had written a lot, or most of, those lyrics, I think, and he had just learned them; he was reading them off of a piece of paper. We got to the bridge, and he knew that he was supposed to scream "Put me out of my misery," but he didn't know how many measures that part was. So he just held the note as long as he possibly could. He was having a really good day in the studio. He had a ton of control, and he got to that point and just let it go well into the next chorus. I don't remember exactly how far. And he's like, "I don't know how long just to scream that part." I'm like, "Dude, I'm not touching that vocal. That was amazing. I'm just going to rearrange the song around what you just did.""

The sounds heard in the intro of the song were added by guitarist Brad Delson, who jingled his keys and added layers of handclaps. The song was made available as a single on March 3, 2008.

== Single release ==
In June 2007, the official Billboard website gave information stating that "Given Up" and "Shadow of the Day" would be the next two singles from Minutes to Midnight, following "What I've Done." This proved incorrect after "Bleed It Out" was promoted to single status, and by that time was released as a promo single between "What I've Done" and "Bleed It Out" mainly due to heavy airplay on alternative rock stations at the time. On January 24, 2008, it was announced that "Given Up" would be the band's next single after "Shadow of the Day," released on October 16, 2007. The single was released as digital download on February 17, 2008, along with a cover art.

== Music video ==
One of the random frames in the music video

On his official blog, Chester Bennington stated both when the video was shot and that it features live performance from the band. Bennington told the crowd at the MEN Arena and the O2 Arena during shows on January 27 and 29 that the performance of "Given Up" was recorded for use in the video, although cameras were also visible during the performance of the song at the concert on January 28 at the O2 Arena. Linkin Park had officially finished filming the video on February 6, according to Billboard Magazine. The video premiered on the band's official website on March 3, 2008, at 4pm Pacific Standard Time (Midnight UTC). The video was uploaded to the band's YouTube channel on March 4, 2008. The video was directed by Mark Fiore, the band's videographer, with additional directing credits to the band.

The video consists of live clips from the shows (stated above) and has been edited together in a sharp, rugged manner which contains short cut scenes with many special effects, mainly altering the coloring. Transitions between cut scenes are in a style of worn analog tape distortion giving the video an even more rugged, tough appearance. Bennington performs his seventeen-second scream perched on the guard rail, inches from the audience. Throughout the video, several flash scenes appear such as a cowboy, hippopotamus, an MRI of a knee, and quotes from Magical Thinking: True Stories (the "Commercial Break" chapter), a book by Augusten Burroughs.

== In other media ==
The song can be heard in the films Grave Encounters 2 (2012) and Red 2 (2013). The song was also used in the trailer and commercials for the 2009 film Crank: High Voltage, in which frontman Chester Bennington makes a cameo.

It is included as a master track in the Xbox 360, PlayStation 3, and Nintendo Wii versions of the music video game Rock Revolution, and as DLC for Rock Band 4, though these versions are heavily censored.

== Commercial performance ==
On the Billboard Hot 100, "Given Up" was the least successful single of Minutes to Midnight. The single charted on Billboard's Hot 100 and Pop 100 charts at numbers 99 and 78 respectively in May 2007, following Minutes to Midnight's release.

However, on the Mainstream Rock and Modern Rock charts, it peaked higher than its follow-up, "Leave Out All the Rest". Following the single's official release, the song debuted at number 34 on the Mainstream Rock Tracks chart, peaking at number 5. It also debuted at number 32 on the Modern Rock Tracks chart, peaking at number 4.

== Track listings ==
All tracks are written by Linkin Park.

CD • 7" Picture disc • iTunes single
No.	Title	Length
1.	"Given Up"	3:09

Europe single
No.	Title	Length
1.	"Given Up"	3:11
2.	"Valentine's Day" (Live from Frankfurt Germany, Jan. 20 '08)	3:23

Europe Premium single
No.	Title	Length
1.	"Given Up"	3:09
2.	"Given Up" (Video)	3:12

iTunes EP
No.	Title	Length
1.	"Given Up"	3:09
2.	"Valentine's Day" (Live from Frankfurt Germany, Jan. 20 '08)	3:24
3.	"In Between" (Live from London UK, Jan. 29 '08)	3:25

== Charts ==
=== Weekly charts ===
2007–2008 weekly chart performance for "Given Up"
Chart (2007–2008)	Peak position
Canada Rock (Billboard)	25
Czech Republic Airplay (ČNS IFPI)	15
Germany (GfK)	53
Scottish Singles Sales (Official Charts)	68
UK Physical Singles (Official Charts)	60
UK Rock & Metal (Official Charts)	4
US Billboard Hot 100	99
US Alternative Airplay (Billboard)	4
US Mainstream Rock Airplay (Billboard)	5
US Pop 100 (Billboard)	78
Venezuela Pop Rock (Record Report)	4

2017 weekly chart performance for "Given Up"
Chart (2017)	Peak position
UK Rock & Metal (Official Charts)	28

=== Year-end charts ===
Year-end chart performance for "Given Up"
Chart (2008)	Position
US Alternative Airplay (Billboard)	10
US Mainstream Rock (Billboard)	14

== Certifications ==
Certifications for "Given Up"
Region	Certification	Certified units/sales
New Zealand (RMNZ)	Platinum	30,000^{‡}
United Kingdom (BPI)	Gold	400,000^{‡}
United States (RIAA)	Platinum	1,000,000^{‡}
^{‡} Sales+streaming figures based on certification alone.

== Release history ==
Release dates for "Given Up"
Country	Release date
Malaysia	January 2008
United Kingdom	February 17, 2008
Worldwide	March 3, 2008
