= We Made It (Busta Rhymes song) =

Single by Busta Rhymes featuring Linkin Park
- Released: April 29, 2008
- Genre: Alternative hip hop; rap rock
- Length: 3:58
- Label: Flipmode; Aftermath; Interscope
- Songwriters: Trevor Smith; Marcello Valenzano; Andre Lyon; Chester Bennington; Brad Delson; Mike Shinoda
- Producers: Cool & Dre; Mike Shinoda

Busta Rhymes singles chronology
"Don't Touch Me (Throw da Water on 'Em)" (2008)	"We Made It" (2008)	"Peace Sign/Index Down" (2008)

Linkin Park singles chronology
"Given Up" (2008)	"We Made It" (2008)	"Leave Out All the Rest" (2008)

Music video
- "We Made It" on YouTube

"We Made It" is a single by rapper Busta Rhymes featuring American rock band Linkin Park. The song was to be on Busta's eighth studio album, Back on My B.S., but was then cancelled off the track list because the album was released on a different label as "We Made It" as Busta's last song on Interscope. The song was produced by Cool & Dre, with additional production by Linkin Park's Mike Shinoda and Brad Delson. The song was released on April 29, 2008. It was Busta Rhymes's final release on Aftermath Entertainment.

The track debuted and peaked on the Billboard Hot 100 charts at number 65. The song reach to the number 10 on the UK Singles Chart, becoming Busta's 11th and Linkin Park's 5th top 10 hit in the United Kingdom. The single peaked at number 10 and remained there after the physical release. The single also had significant success in Germany peaking at number 11 on the German Singles Chart.

== Background ==
Busta Rhymes said that the inspiration for this song was from what happened to T.I. after the BET Awards:

The record was inspired by the situation that transpired with T.I. right after the BET Hip-Hop Awards. My legal situations were current, and his legal situations were current, and Akon had his, you know, history of legal situations in the past ... We wanted people to — as bad as things might look for us sometimes — just know that it ain't over until you say it's over at the end of the day. 'Cause nobody can really dictate what the outcome of your destiny, what your life is going to end up becoming, unless you let it happen that way.

Dre originally sang the hook, until Rhymes listened to the beat and Linkin Park kept "popping up in his head".

The song was first performed on May 2, 2008, during Busta's concert at Club Index in Germany. However, he was more or less introducing the song to them, as the studio version was played and Busta occasionally sang over the song, or lip synced to it while holding his microphone down. The first performance with Linkin Park was at their rehearsal studio Third Encore on May 25, 2008, to an audience of 14 members of the Linkin Park fan club who were brought there by surprise. During the Projekt Revolution 2008 tour the song's performance featured Adam Monroe of Ashes Divide on the keyboard and Spliff Star on backing vocals and was played during Linkin Park's set. During Busta Rhymes' concerts, where Linkin Park is not present, the studio instrumental is played and Busta usually tells the audience to move their arms up and down during Mike Shinoda's verse.

The song appears on the soundtrack of Madden NFL 09. Additionally, it was used as the theme song for coverage of the 2008 NBA Western Conference Finals; this marked the second time a Shinoda song was used during the NBA play-offs, the first being "Remember the Name" by Fort Minor. The song was also used in the 2008 Philadelphia Phillies home World Series game before the team took the field in Games 3, 4, and 5 and as part of a video reel of highlights for the team leading up to the World Series, with a road in the background as the team took their playoff run "on the road".

Upon watching Barack Obama's 2008 Presidential election victory, Busta began cheering and singing the chorus of "We Made It".

Chamillionaire created his own version of the song called "The Real Thang" with a similar theme. The song is available on his Mixtape Messiah 4.

== Music video ==
The music video premiered all day on BET on Tuesday, April 29, the same day as the video for its first single, "Don't Touch Me (Throw da Water on 'Em)." The video also premiered for 24 hours only on Yahoo! Music on April 29. That same day, "We Made It" went to radio stations worldwide. The video also featured cameo appearances from Styles of Beyond, Bishop Lamont and Lamar Odom. Chris Robinson directed the video. * The warehouse in which the parts of the music video was filmed is the same location at which Linkin Park's Meteora album artwork and album cover were done. The video starts with the credits saying "Busta Rhymes" and "Linkin Park", and then the titles "We Made It" appear on the screen. Then you see Linkin Park walking through the warehouse and Busta Rhymes in a New York City flat. Then it cuts to scenes of people walking through the streets and people running a race through the rain.

== Track listing ==
CD single
No.	Title	Length
1.	"We Made It" (Album Version)	3:58
2.	"We Made It" (A Capella) (Edit)	3:00
3.	"We Made It" (Instrumental)	3:58
4.	"We Made It" (Video)	4:31

iTunes EP
No.	Title	Length
1.	"We Made It" (Album Version)	3:58
2.	"We Made It" (A Cappella) (Edit)	2:59
3.	"We Made It" (Instrumental)	3:58

== Personnel ==
- Busta Rhymes – rapping
- Eddie "Crack Keys" Montilla – keyboards
- Cool & Dre – all other instruments
- Neil Pogue – mixing engineer
- Gina Victoria and Rande Johnson – recording engineers

Linkin Park

- Chester Bennington – vocals
- Mike Shinoda – rapping, guitar
- Brad Delson – guitar

== Charts ==
=== Weekly charts ===
Weekly chart performance for "We Made It"
Chart (2008)	Peak position
Australia (ARIA)	37
Austria (Ö3 Austria Top 40)	16
Canada Hot 100 (Billboard)	40
Czech Republic Airplay (ČNS IFPI)	13
Euro Digital Song Sales (Billboard)	7
Germany (GfK)	11
Ireland (IRMA)	12
New Zealand (Recorded Music NZ)	13
Norway (VG-lista)	11
Scottish Singles Sales (Official Charts)	13
Slovakia Airplay (ČNS IFPI)	70
Sweden (Sverigetopplistan)	24
Switzerland (Schweizer Hitparade)	17
UK Singles (Official Charts)	10
UK Hip Hop/R&B (Official Charts)	3
US Billboard Hot 100	65

=== Year-end charts ===
Year-end chart performance for "We Made It"
Chart (2008)	Position
Germany (Official German Charts)	91
UK Singles (OCC)	89
UK Urban (Music Week)	12

== Certifications ==
Certifications and sales for "We Made It"
Region	Certification	Certified units/sales
United Kingdom (BPI)	Silver	200,000^{‡}
^{‡} Sales+streaming figures based on certification alone.
