= Shadow of the Day =

2007 single by Linkin Park

Single by Linkin Park

from the album Minutes to Midnight
- B-side: "Bleed It Out" (live); "No More Sorrow" (Third Encore session)
- Released: October 16, 2007
- Recorded: 2007
- Studio: The Mansion, Los Angeles
- Genre: Alternative rock; electronic rock
- Length: 4:49 (album version); 4:16 (single version)
- Label: Warner Bros.
- Composer: Linkin Park
- Lyricists: Chester Bennington; Mike Shinoda
- Producers: Rick Rubin; Mike Shinoda

Linkin Park singles chronology
"Bleed It Out" (2007)	"Shadow of the Day" (2007)	"Given Up" (2008)

Audio sample
- file; help

Music video
- "Shadow of the Day" on YouTube

"Shadow of the Day" is a song by American rock band Linkin Park. The song was released as the third single from their third studio album, Minutes to Midnight, on October 16, 2007. Lead vocalist Chester Bennington plays rhythm guitar on the song. The first public performance of "Shadow of the Day" was during the Projekt Revolution tour in Auburn, Washington, on July 25, 2007. On September 4, 2012, "Shadow of the Day", along with "Breaking the Habit", "New Divide", and "Burn It Down", was released in the "Linkin Park Pack 02" as downloadable content for the music rhythm video game, Rock Band 3.

== Song structure and background information ==
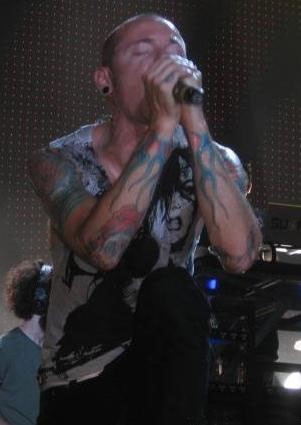
Chester Bennington performing at Smirnoff Music Centre in Dallas, Texas during the Projekt Revolution tour, 2007

The band experimented with several different versions of the keyboard loop, before deciding on the one used in the final version. Lead singer Chester Bennington explained that they used over 60 different beats for this song until they found a suitable one. They also used different types of instruments like banjos at first, experimenting with different styles until they came up with something that would fit the track.

The song is based around the Doomsday clock counting down, and the song concludes at the end with the Doomsday clock having reached midnight, which is the time that is perceived that humanity breaks down due to catastrophic failures of peace, existence and life itself.

Like "Breaking the Habit", "Shadow of the Day" uses samples of live string ensemble recordings, played by Mike Shinoda. The song is written in the key of B major, the first major key the band has ever used. The chorus is based on the very common I–V–vi–IV progression (B, F♯, G♯m, E in the key of B major). On the verses, the chord progression is the less common vi–V–IV–IV (G♯m, F♯/A♯, E, E). The end of the album version of the song, which is an instrumental piece, crossfades into the start of "What I've Done". It is the second-longest track on the album. Shinoda joins Bennington on the lines "Sometimes beginnings aren't so simple, sometimes goodbye's the only way" and the last three choruses.

It is the band's first song where Bennington played rhythm guitar live (if not including the band's mash-up from Meteora World Tour, named "Step Up/Nobody's Listening/It's Goin' Down", where Chester also played rhythm guitar, specifically on "It's Goin' Down", which also was performed fully on the band's Hybrid Theory Tour), due to the requirement of a second guitar in the final chorus, and Shinoda, who typically acts as a second guitarist played keyboards instead. However, this is not the first song on which Bennington plays guitar, since he plays it on the highly-processed intro of "Somewhere I Belong". Later, Bennington would also play rhythm guitar on live performances of "Iridescent". Bennington would also play rhythm guitar on live performances of a few songs from the album One More Light before his death in July 2017.

The song was remastered for iTunes in 2013, with a new arrangement of strings.

== Music video ==
The music video was directed by band member Joe Hahn. It takes place during a large scale civil unrest in what appears to be the United States. The video was shot in Los Angeles at 20th Century Fox. The action was set up by stunt coordinator Steven Ho.

The music video was released to the internet on October 15, 2007. The video shows Chester Bennington waking up. His alarm clock reads 11:55, the then Doomsday Clock time, referencing the album title Minutes to Midnight and the song which is the fifth song on the album. The video is over four minutes long, meaning that the time at the end would be 11:59 PM, or one minute to midnight. Bennington then watches the news, washes up, gets dressed, and goes outside. The video takes place in a war-torn world, where mass chaos is ensuing on the streets of the city. There is a lot of violence going on with many police and gunshots. Plumes of smoke can be seen in the sky. Soldiers and riot police can be seen forcefully detaining civilians. Near the end of the video, a car is set on fire and bursts into flames as several people taking place in the riot throw molotov cocktails at police resulting in the Police Riot Control and SWAT teams opening fire and advancing while the mob of people retreat. A man suddenly throws a bottle of alcohol on a car and the car takes fire. Bennington then stands in front of the burning car, while looking at the carnage that surrounds him. He then turns towards the flames, and the video fades to black. The electronic/synth outro of the song is excluded on the video to make it a more appropriate finish. If listened to carefully towards the middle of the video, the mob is shouting 'we want freedom'.

This is the only band video with Bennington appearing without the other band members. The video features no performance footage other than Bennington's singing. Sound effects taking place in the video can be heard along with the music.

There are also three different edits of the video:

- A director's cut which is available at Joe Hahn's section of the Linkin Park website. In this version there are several scenes not in other versions. Bennington is seen carrying a bag which he drops on the ground around 3:18 into the song. A few seconds later it returns to Bennington's house and zooms in on a table containing many wires and other electronics. There are also several blueprints and video monitors for security cameras displaying a certain building. After about 30 seconds there is a giant explosion destroying the building that the video monitors were displaying.
- An alternate ending to the video, which shows Bennington begin to walk away from the flames. The police open fire, and the video ends with a shot of Bennington's bag falling to the ground. The alternate ending is only shown on MTV Europe music channels.
- MTV Overdrive contains a version which scenes with gunfire and bottle smashing are cut and replaced with different riot scenes.

The video won Best Rock Video at the 2008 MTV Video Music Awards and was also nominated for Best Direction in a Video. The video was placed at number 37 of the year by VH1's Top 40 Videos of the Year. The song was also featured in the 2008 Beijing Olympics during Tyson Gay's highlight reel just prior to the 100m final.

== Commercial performance ==
The song charted before its release on the U.S. Modern Rock Tracks chart. It debuted on the U.S. Bubbling Under Hot 100 Singles chart at number 18, which is equivalent to number 118. Two weeks later, it debuted on the Hot 100 at number 89, and finally peaked at number 15, becoming the band's second top twenty hit on the chart from Minutes to Midnight. It also reached number two on the Modern Rock chart (held off the top spot by both Seether hit “Fake It” and Foo Fighters hit "Long Road to Ruin"), and number six on the Mainstream Rock chart. The week "Shadow of the Day" jumped to the top twenty of the Modern Rock chart, it made Linkin Park one of only six acts to simultaneously have three songs in the top twenty of the chart, since "Bleed It Out" was at number two, and "What I've Done" was at number 13. U2, R.E.M., Foo Fighters, Kings of Leon, and Muse are the other five bands to accomplish this feat. On the Pop Songs chart, the song has become one of Linkin Park's only top ten hits along with "Numb" and "In the End", where it peaked at number nine. "Shadow of the Day" was also a success on the Billboard Adult Top 40 chart, where it reached the top ten at number six, becoming the first Linkin Park song to do so on that chart. As of June 2014, the song has sold 1,977,000 copies in the US.

"Shadow of the Day" has also been highly successful in many other parts of the world. It has reached the top twenty in over 15 countries, including in Australia (at number 15), Canada (at number 12), France (at number 20), Germany (at number 12), New Zealand (at number 13), Portugal (at number 18), Sweden (at number 20), and Switzerland (at number 11) among others. However, the song fared poorly in the United Kingdom, where it peaked at number 46, the band's lowest charting single there until "Leave Out All the Rest" peaked at number 90.

== Track listings ==
All tracks are written by Linkin Park.

CD1
No.	Title	Length
1.	"Shadow of the Day"	4:16
2.	"Bleed It Out" (Live from Projekt Revolution, Holmdel NJ, August 29, 2007)	6:07

CD2 • Australian maxi single • iTunes EP
No.	Title	Length
1.	"Shadow of the Day"	4:16
2.	"Bleed It Out" (Live from Projekt Revolution, Holmdel NJ, August 29, 2007)	6:07
3.	"No More Sorrow" (Third Encore Session)	3:45

7-inch picture disc
No.	Title	Length
1.	"Shadow of the Day"	4:16
2.	"No More Sorrow" (Third Encore Session)	3:45

iTunes exclusive video album
No.	Title	Length
1.	"Shadow of the Day" (music video)	4:17
2.	"Shadow of the Day" (Making of the Video)	3:01

== Personnel ==
- Chester Bennington – lead vocals, rhythm guitar
- Mike Shinoda – keyboards, backing vocals
- Brad Delson – lead guitar
- Joe Hahn – turntables, sampler, programming
- Dave "Phoenix" Farrell – bass guitar
- Rob Bourdon – drums, percussion

== Charts ==
=== Weekly charts ===
2007–2008 weekly chart performance for "Shadow of the Day"
Chart (2007–2008)	Peak position
Australia (ARIA)	15
Austria (Ö3 Austria Top 40)	6
Belgium (Ultratip Bubbling Under Flanders)	2
Belgium (Ultratop 50 Wallonia)	40
Canada Hot 100 (Billboard)	12
Canada CHR/Top 40 (Billboard)	15
Canada Hot AC (Billboard)	13
Canada Rock (Billboard)	2
Czech Republic Airplay (ČNS IFPI)	15
France (SNEP)	20
Germany (GfK)	12
Germany Airplay (BVMI)	2
Hungary (Rádiós Top 40)	12
Netherlands (Dutch Top 40 Tipparade)	10
New Zealand (Recorded Music NZ)	13
Scotland Singles (OCC)	32
Slovakia Airplay (ČNS IFPI)	15
Sweden (Sverigetopplistan)	20
Switzerland (Schweizer Hitparade)	11
UK Singles (OCC)	46
UK Rock & Metal (OCC)	2
US Billboard Hot 100	15
US Adult Pop Airplay (Billboard)	6
US Alternative Airplay (Billboard)	2
US Mainstream Rock (Billboard)	6
US Pop Airplay (Billboard)	9
Venezuela Pop Rock (Record Report)	1

2017 weekly chart performance for "Shadow of the Day"
Chart (2017)	Peak position
US Hot Rock & Alternative Songs (Billboard)	19

=== Monthly charts ===
2025 monthly chart performance for "Shadow of the Day"
Chart (2025)	Peak position
Russia Streaming (TopHit)	95

=== Year-end charts ===
Year-end chart performance "Shadow of the Day"
Chart (2008)	Position
Australia (ARIA)	88
Austria (Ö3 Austria Top 40)	37
Canada (Canadian Hot 100)	50
Europe (Eurochart Hot 100)	72
Germany (Media Control GfK)	55
Hungary (Rádiós Top 40)	55
Switzerland (Schweizer Hitparade)	69
US Billboard Hot 100	55
US Adult Top 40 (Billboard)	19
US Alternative Airplay (Billboard)	9

== Certifications ==
Certifications for "Shadow of the Day"
Region	Certification	Certified units/sales
Germany (BVMI)	Gold	150,000^{‡}
New Zealand (RMNZ)	Platinum	30,000^{‡}
Switzerland (IFPI Switzerland)	Gold	15,000^{^}
United Kingdom (BPI)	Silver	200,000^{‡}
United States (RIAA)	2× Platinum	2,000,000^{‡}
^{^} Shipments figures based on certification alone.^{‡} Sales+streaming figures based on certification alone.
