= Minutes to Midnight (Linkin Park album) =

2007 studio album by Linkin Park

Studio album by Linkin Park
- Released: May 14, 2007
- Recorded: January 2006 – March 2007
- Studios: The Mansion; (Laurel Canyon, Los Angeles); NRG Recordings; (North Hollywood, Los Angeles)
- Genres: Alternative rock; alternative metal; hard rock
- Length: 43:23
- Labels: Warner Bros.; Machine Shop
- Producers: Rick Rubin; Mike Shinoda

Linkin Park chronology
Collision Course (2004)	Minutes to Midnight (2007)	Road to Revolution: Live at Milton Keynes (2008)

Singles from Minutes to Midnight
- 1. "What I've Done" Released: April 2, 2007; 2. "Bleed It Out" Released: August 17, 2007; 3. "Shadow of the Day" Released: October 16, 2007; 4. "Given Up" Released: March 3, 2008; 5. "Leave Out All the Rest" Released: May 17, 2008

Minutes to Midnight is the third studio album by American rock band Linkin Park, released on May 14, 2007, through Warner Bros. Records. The album was produced by Mike Shinoda and Rick Rubin; it is Linkin Park's first studio album produced without Don Gilmore, who had produced the band's two previous albums. Minutes to Midnight is the band's follow-up album to Meteora (2003), and features a shift in the group's musical direction. For the band, the album marked a beginning of deviation from their signature nu metal sound. Minutes to Midnight takes its title from the Doomsday Clock symbol. It is also the band's first full-length album to carry a Parental Advisory label.

Linkin Park started working on their third studio album in 2003, taking a break to tour in support of Meteora in 2004. In this time period, the band formed numerous side projects; Mike Shinoda formed his hip hop side project Fort Minor, while Chester Bennington formed Dead by Sunrise, both of which caused the album to be shelved temporarily. The band returned to work on the record afterward, taking on a different musical direction from the 2003 sessions while working with producer Rick Rubin. The album's completion was delayed several times for unknown reasons. Eventually, "What I've Done" was released in April 2, 2007 as the album's lead single, with the full album being released in North America on May 15, 2007.

The album debuted at number one in the US Billboard 200 and in 15 other countries, including the United Kingdom and Canada. In the United States, the album had the biggest first week sales of 2007 at the time, with 623,000 albums sold, going on to be certified five times platinum in the US. It has sold more than four million copies in the US. It was ranked number 154 on Billboard's Hot 200 Albums of the Decade. Despite its commercial success, Minutes to Midnight received mixed reviews from critics. Rolling Stone magazine, however, named it the twenty-fifth best album of 2007.

== Background ==
In an interview, lead singer Chester Bennington explained that the album is "a mix of punk, classic rock, and hip-hop standards" and that "Rick has brought more of a stripped down, classic-rock and hip-hop kind of feel."

In another interview, Bennington stated: "This time around, Mike Shinoda is singing a lot more. It may seem like he's not on the record, but he's doing a lot of the harmonies. He also sings a couple of songs alone. We're presenting ourselves in a different way."

=== Recording and composition ===
"Bleed It Out"
16-second sample of "Bleed It Out", the second single from Minutes to Midnight.

"Shadow of the Day"
30-second sample of "Shadow of the Day", the third single from Minutes to Midnight.

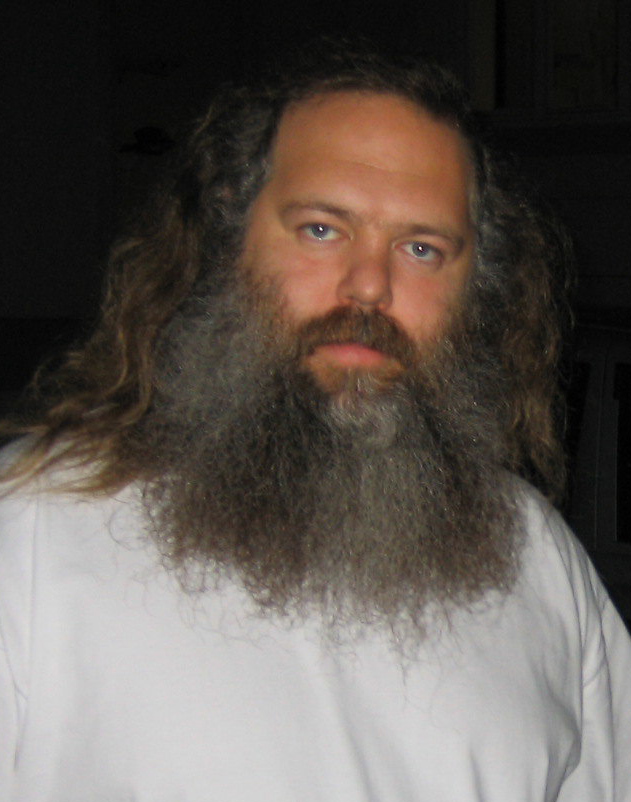
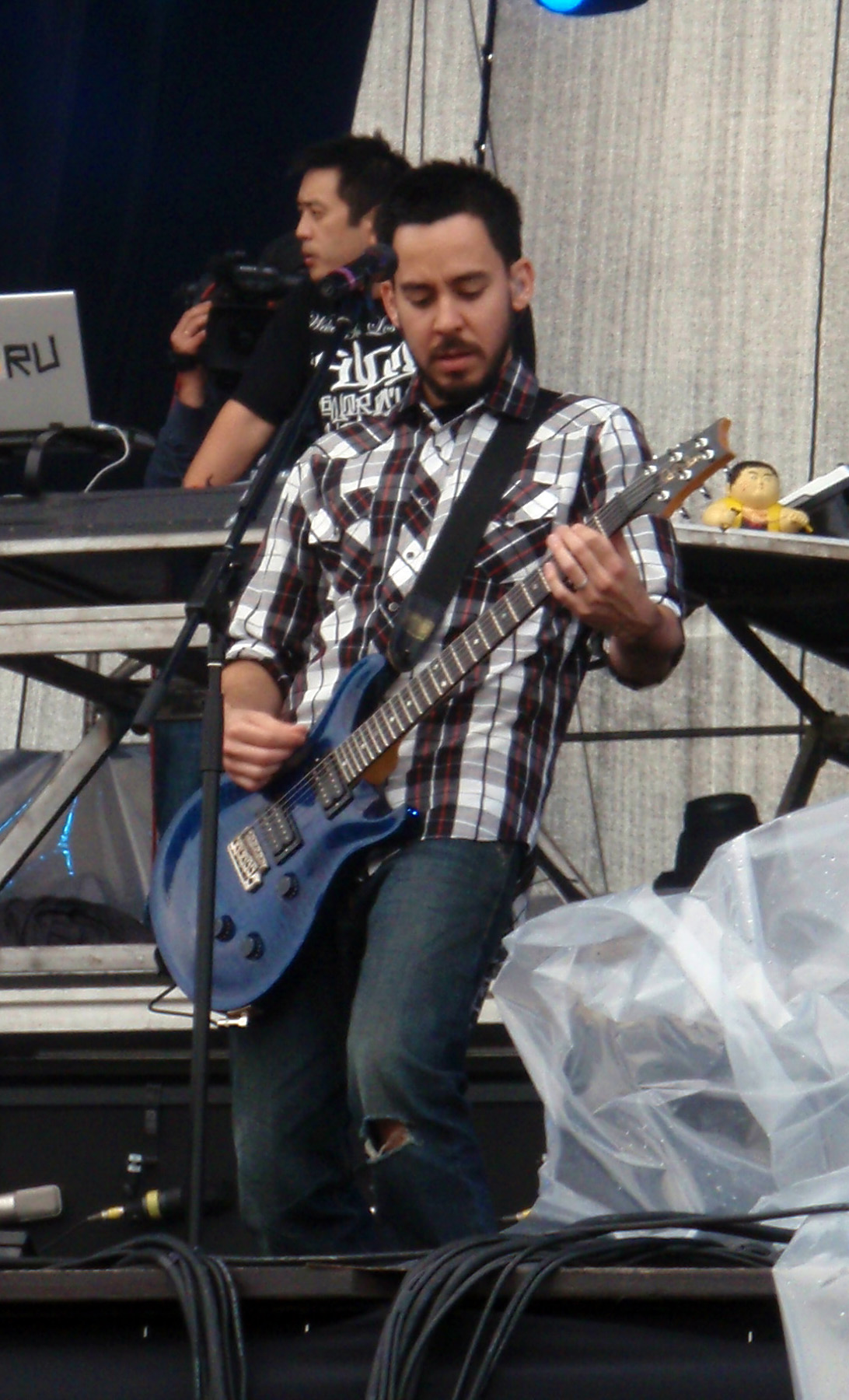
Rick Rubin (left) and Linkin Park co-vocalist Mike Shinoda (right) served as producers for Minutes to Midnight.

Guitarist Brad Delson experimented with an EBow when the band was piecing together "The Little Things Give You Away". The band decided not to use the effect for the solo in that song and instead ended up creating "No More Sorrow" out of the effect. In "Given Up", he jingles the keys that are heard while several clap sounds are overlaid in the intro of the song (as mentioned in the lyric book: Brad added the sounds on the intro song: multiple tracks of claps - and keys jingling.). Shinoda and Delson teamed up with David Campbell to add string elements to six songs; "Leave Out All the Rest", "Shadow of the Day", "Hands Held High", "The Little Things Give You Away", as well as the two b-sides "No Roads Left" and "Blackbirds" (which was instead later used in the iPhone game 8-Bit Rebellion! as well as being included as a bonus track for A Thousand Suns), respectively. All scratching elements by Joe Hahn that existed in the previous two studio albums are largely absent because of the low mixing, except on the songs "What I've Done", "Wake", "The Little Things Give You Away", "Valentine's Day" and "In Pieces". Hahn contributes more with programming, electronics, and other elements to many of the songs. The church organ and military drumbeat on "Hands Held High" were originally to be used as the backdrop to melodic vocals, but Rubin recommended that the band try the opposite approach according to the album booklet. For the album, the band recorded fifty to sixty songs in August 2006. Their previous albums took only about three to six months to complete, while this one took 14 months. They spent over six months writing the songs. In previous albums, they composed an average of 40 songs, but they made over 100 this time. "Shadow of the Day" is one of two songs (the other being "No Roads Left") to have Bennington playing the guitar. During live performances, Shinoda is generally playing the keyboard for "Shadow of the Day", while Bennington plays rhythm guitar. Shinoda stated in an interview: "We were looking back at the things that we had done in the past... and I think we just figured that we had exhausted that sound. It was easy for us to replicate, it was easy for other bands to replicate, and we just needed to move on."

Shinoda performs his rapping vocals on only two tracks, "Bleed It Out" and "Hands Held High". This is a significant decrease compared to the amount of rapping on previous albums. The rap vocals on "Hands Held High" are much closer styled to Mike Shinoda's side project Fort Minor than his traditional Linkin Park verses, as he raps during most of the song. Despite a decrease of Mike Shinoda as rapper, he has three solo lead songs on the record: "Hands Held High", "In Between" and the bonus track "No Roads Left". He also raps on "Bleed It Out" while "What I've Done", "Shadow of the Day", "No More Sorrow" and "The Little Things Give You Away" features backing vocals from Shinoda at the end. Minutes to Midnight is also Linkin Park's first album to feature guitar solos, particularly in the tracks "What I've Done," "In Pieces" and "The Little Things Give You Away". Also, unlike the previous two studio albums, Minutes to Midnight contains profanity and thus the first Linkin Park studio album to contain a Parental Advisory (the first overall being their collaborative EP with Jay-Z, Collision Course) and politically charged lyrics. The songs that contain profanity are "Given Up", "Bleed It Out" and "Hands Held High". Genre-wise, the album has been described as alternative rock, alternative metal, and hard rock.

=== Cover artwork ===
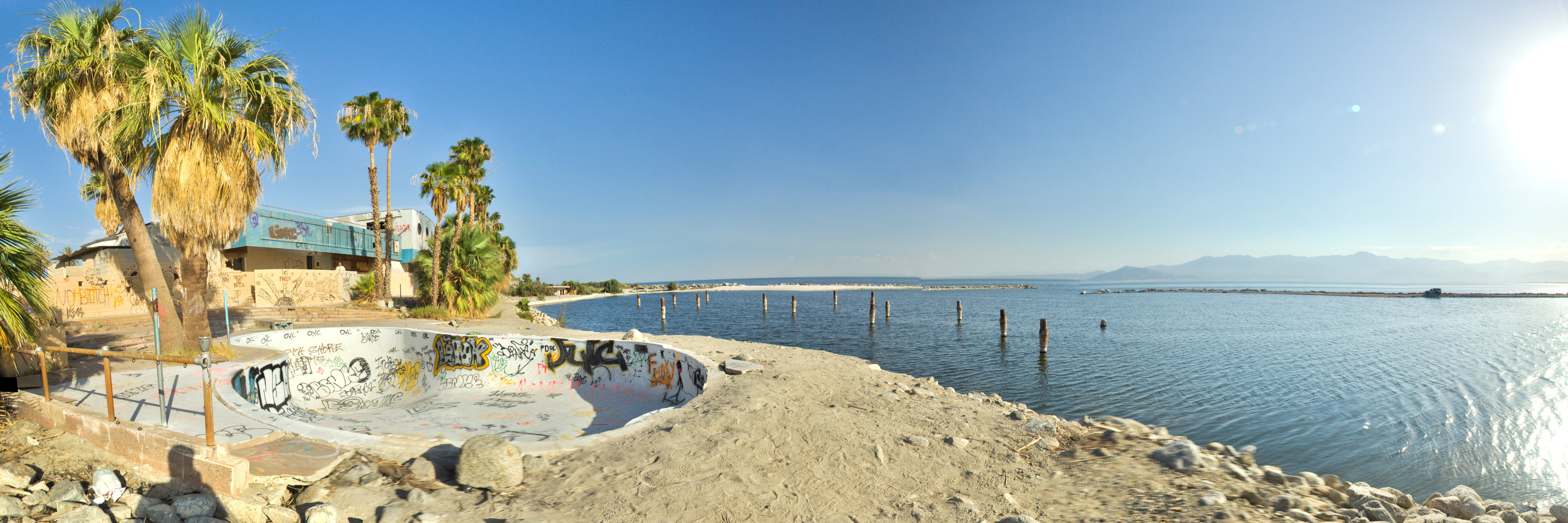
Ruins of North Shore Beach and Yacht Club in North Shore, California

The front and back cover were recorded around the ruins of North Shore Beach and Yacht Club in North Shore, California. A year after the release of Minutes to Midnight, the band released ten different covers that were originally used as consideration for the final cover for the album prior to its release. The band made all ten of these covers available for fans to use as the album art on iTunes.

== Critical reception ==
Professional ratings
Aggregate scores
Source	Rating
Metacritic	56/100
Review scores
Source	Rating
AllMusic	4/5 stars
Entertainment Weekly	C
The Guardian	3/5 stars
Los Angeles Times	2.5/4 stars
Melodic	2.4/5 stars
NME	2/10
PopMatters	6/10
Rolling Stone	4/5 stars
Spin	7/10
USA Today	3/4 stars

According to the review aggregator Metacritic, Minutes to Midnight received "mixed or average reviews" based on a weighted average score of 56 out of 100 from 15 critic scores.

Rolling Stone gave Minutes to Midnight 4 out of 5 stars, stating that "most of Minutes is honed, metallic pop with a hip hop stride and a wake-up kick", and it was placed at number 25 in their list of the Top 50 Albums of 2007. IGN referred to it as "definitely a step in the right direction and a stepping stone for things to come". Herald Sun writer Karen Tye gave it 3½ out of 4 stars and praised the band's new sound, asking, "Who knew being a plain old rock band could suit Linkin Park so well?". Despite commending the band for their ambition, The Guardian's Caroline Sullivan gave the album 3 out of 5 stars and perceived "their decision to stay roughly within the shrieky boundaries of their genre" as a weakness, while writing that "the sound still pivots on the interplay of walloping guitar chords and self-flagellating lyrics".

Among those with a more negative view of the album was Stephen Thomas Erlewine of AllMusic, who described the album's sound as "passé" and summed the band's effort up as "opting to create a muddled, colorless murk", giving it 3 and a half out of 5 stars. Johan Wippsson from Melodic acknowledged the band's progression but felt that the album is "weak" and "too shattered". NME magazine's Dan Silver gave it a rating of 2/10, calling it the "sound of a band trying and failing to forge a new identity", and referring to the song "Hands Held High", a song about terrorist attacks and war, as "far and away the funniest thing you will hear all year".

In 2024, Loudwire staff elected it as the best hard rock album of 2007.

== Commercial performance ==
Minutes to Midnight was delayed several times before its release. First scheduled to be released in the summer of 2006, it was later postponed to the fall of 2006, then again to early 2007. The album's release date was finally set for May 14, 2007. In Canada, the album was released on May 15, 2007. There are non-Parental Advisory releases of both the regular album and the special edition album. The songs "Given Up", "Bleed It Out", and "Hands Held High" are edited. In Malaysia, the edited version for the album is available in digipak cover while the explicit Tour Edition features a white slipcase cardboard cover and a standard jewel case. In the United States, the album had the biggest first week sales of 2007 at the time, with 623,000 albums sold. In Canada, the album sold over 50,000 copies in its first week and debuted at number one on the Canadian Albums Chart. Worldwide, the album shipped over 3.3 million copies in its first four weeks of release.

Five singles were released from the album: "What I've Done", "Bleed It Out", "Shadow of the Day", "Given Up", and "Leave Out All the Rest". Although "Given Up" and "Leave Out All the Rest" had not been released as singles until early March 2008, "Given Up" had already charted on the Billboard Hot 100 and Billboard Pop 100 charts at numbers 99 and 78 respectively in 2007, and "Leave Out All the Rest" had already charted on Billboard's Pop 100 chart at number 98 and Billboard's Bubbling Under Hot 100 Singles chart at number 17 in 2007. The songs "Hands Held High" and "No More Sorrow" also charted on the Bubbling Under Hot 100 Singles chart at numbers 23 and 24, respectively, in 2007. The album has sold 3.3 million copies sold in the US alone. Although sales of the album were lower than their two first studio albums, the album was more successful in terms of single's charting performance, with all of the five singles released reaching the Billboard Hot 100, and two songs reaching the Bubbling Under Hot 100.

== Track listing ==
All lyrics are written by Chester Bennington and Mike Shinoda; all music is composed by Linkin Park.

No.	Title	Length
1.	"Wake" (instrumental)	1:40
2.	"Given Up"	3:09
3.	"Leave Out All the Rest"	3:29
4.	"Bleed It Out"	2:44
5.	"Shadow of the Day"	4:50
6.	"What I've Done"	3:25
7.	"Hands Held High"	3:53
8.	"No More Sorrow"	3:41
9.	"Valentine's Day"	3:16
10.	"In Between"	3:16
11.	"In Pieces"	3:38
12.	"The Little Things Give You Away"	6:23
Total length:		43:34

Special edition bonus DVD
No.	Title	Length
1.	"The Making of Minutes to Midnight"	39:42
2.	"What I've Done" (video)	3:28
3.	"Making of What I've Done Video"	20:49
4.	"Advanced resolution PCM Stereo of all 12 tracks"

Japanese edition bonus track
No.	Title	Length
13.	"Faint" (live in Japan)	2:46
Total length:		46:20

Tour edition bonus tracks
No.	Title	Length
13.	"No Roads Left"	3:48
14.	"What I've Done" (Distorted Remix)	3:47
15.	"Given Up" (Third Encore Session)	3:08
Total length:		54:17

Japanese tour edition bonus tracks
No.	Title	Length
13.	"Faint" (live in Japan)	2:46
14.	"No Roads Left"	3:48
15.	"What I've Done" (Distorted Remix)	3:47
16.	"Given Up" (Third Encore Session)	3:08
Total length:		57:03

iTunes edition bonus tracks
No.	Title	Length
13.	"Faint" (live in Japan; does not appear on the clean deluxe (iTunes) version of the album (Canada), nor on either explicit or clean deluxe editions in the US)	2:44
14.	"What I've Done" (live at Sessions@AOL; appears on both explicit and clean deluxe (iTunes) version of the album in Canada and the US)	3:24
15.	"No Roads Left" (pre-order only, originally at track 14)	3:52
Total length:		53:23

2013 iTunes deluxe edition bonus tracks
No.	Title	Length
13.	"No Roads Left"	3:48
14.	"Across the Line"	3:11
Total length:		50:22

Wal-Mart edition bonus tracks
No.	Title	Length
13.	"Breaking the Habit" (live at Soundcheck)	4:25
14.	"What I've Done" (live at Soundcheck)	3:24
Total length:		51:12

Best Buy edition bonus tracks
No.	Title	Length
13.	"What I've Done" (live at Sessions@AOL)	3:29
14.	"No More Sorrow" (live at Sessions@AOL)	3:45
15.	"Given Up" (live at Sessions@AOL)	3:12
Total length:		53:49

Circuit City edition bonus tracks
No.	Title	Length
13.	"Faint" (live)	2:44
14.	"What I've Done" (live)	3:25
Total length:		49:32

Asian digital download tour edition track listing (Live from Shanghai, China, November 18, 2007)
No.	Title	Length
1.	"One Step Closer"
2.	"Lying from You"
3.	"Somewhere I Belong"
4.	"No More Sorrow"
5.	"Papercut"

European digital download tour edition track listing (Live from O2 Arena, London, January 29, 2008)
No.	Title	Length
1.	"What I've Done"	7:27
2.	"One Step Closer"	4:10
3.	"Faint"	4:07
Total length:		15:44

iTunes bonus video edition
No.	Title	Length
13.	"Behind the Scenes featurette"	3:47
14.	"What I've Done" (video)	3:27
Total length:		50:37

15th Anniversary digital deluxe edition bonus tracks
No.	Title	Length
13.	"No Roads Left"	3:48
14.	"Across the Line"	3:10
15.	"Given Up" (Third Encore Session)	3:08
16.	"What I've Done" (Distorted Remix)	3:47
Total length:		57:27

== Minutes to Midnight – Live Around the World ==
Minutes to Midnight – Live Around the World

Live album by Linkin Park
- Released: June 12, 2012
- Recorded: 2007–2010
- Genres: Alternative rock; alternative metal
- Length: 50:34
- Labels: Warner Bros.; Machine Shop
- Producer: Mike Shinoda

Linkin Park chronology
Meteora – Live Around the World (2012)	Minutes to Midnight – Live Around the World (2012)	Living Things (2012)

Minutes to Midnight – Live Around the World is a live album of the band's third studio album, Minutes to Midnight. The live album features live versions of all 12 songs from the original studio album, and they all were recorded in various cities around the world from 2007 to 2010.

=== Track listing ===
Minutes to Midnight – Live Around the World
No.	Title	Length
1.	"Wake" (Live from Taipei, 2007)	1:48
2.	"Given Up" (Live from Taipei, 2009)	3:18
3.	"Leave Out All the Rest" (Live from Frankfurt, 2008)	3:22
4.	"Bleed It Out" (Live from Melbourne, 2010)	5:33
5.	"Shadow of the Day" (Live from Melbourne, 2010)	4:32
6.	"What I've Done" (Live from New York, 2008)	4:57
7.	"Hands Held High" (Live from Osaka, 2007)	3:59
8.	"No More Sorrow" (Live from Taipei, 2009)	4:57
9.	"Valentine's Day" (Live from Amnéville, 2008)	3:21
10.	"In Between" (Live from Paris, 2008)	3:17
11.	"In Pieces" (Live from Koln, 2008)	3:42
12.	"The Little Things Give You Away" (Live from Shanghai, 2007)	7:43
Total length:		50:34

== Personnel ==
Credits adapted for AllMusic, and Minutes to Midnight CD booklet.

Linkin Park
- Chester Bennington – vocals; rhythm guitar (5, "No Roads Left")
- Rob Bourdon – drums, percussion, backing vocals
- Brad Delson – lead guitar, backing vocals; string arrangements (3, 5, 7, 12, "No Roads Left"); sampling (2), EBow (8)
- Dave "Phoenix" Farrell – bass guitar, backing vocals
- Joe Hahn – turntables, sampling, programming, backing vocals; creative direction
- Mike Shinoda – vocals, rhythm guitar, keyboard, producer, creative direction; string arrangements (3, 5, 7, 12, "No Roads Left"); acoustic guitar (12)

Technical personnel

- Rick Rubin – producer
- Andrew Scheps – engineer
- Ethan Mates – engineer
- Dana Nielsen – engineer
- Phillip Broussard, Jr. – assistant engineer
- Neal Avron – mixing
- Nicolas Fournier – mix assistance
- George Gumbs – mix assistance
- Dave Collins – mastering
- Frank Maddocks – creative direction, art direction, design
- Ellen Wakayama – creative direction
- Nikas Constant – art direction

Guest musicians on "Leave Out All the Rest", "Shadow of the Day", "Hands Held High", "The Little Things Give You Away", and "No Roads Left"

- David Campbell – string arrangements and conducting
- Charlie Bisharat – violin
- Mario DeLeon – violin
- Armen Garabedian – violin
- Julian Hallmark – violin
- Gerry Hilera – violin
- Songa Lee-Kitto – violin
- Natalie Leggett – violin
- Josefina Vergara – violin
- Sara Parkins – violin
- Matt Funes – viola
- Andrew Picken – viola
- Larry Corbett – cello
- Suzie Katayama – cello
- Oscar Hidalgo – bass

== Charts ==
=== Weekly charts ===
Chart (2007)	Peak position
Argentine Albums (CAPIF)	7
Australian Albums (ARIA)	1
Austrian Albums (Ö3 Austria)	1
Belgian Albums (Ultratop Flanders)	2
Belgian Albums (Ultratop Wallonia)	2
Canadian Albums (Billboard)	1
Czech Albums (ČNS IFPI)	1
Danish Albums (Hitlisten)	2
Dutch Albums (Album Top 100)	2
European Albums (Billboard)	1
Finnish Albums (Suomen virallinen lista)	1
French Albums (SNEP)	1
German Albums (Offizielle Top 100)	1
Greek Albums (IFPI)	1
Hungarian Albums (MAHASZ)	1
Irish Albums (IRMA)	1
Italian Albums (FIMI)	1
Japanese Albums (Oricon)	1
Mexican Albums (Top 100 Mexico)	2
New Zealand Albums (RMNZ)	1
Norwegian Albums (VG-lista)	1
Polish Albums (ZPAV)	2
Portuguese Albums (AFP)	3
Scottish Albums (Official Charts)	1
Spanish Albums (Promusicae)	2
Swedish Albums (Sverigetopplistan)	1
Swiss Albums (Schweizer Hitparade)	1
Taiwanese Albums (Five Music)	1
UK Albums (Official Charts)	1
UK Rock & Metal Albums (Official Charts)	1
US Billboard 200	1
US Top Hard Rock Albums (Billboard)	1
US Top Rock Albums (Billboard)	1
US Indie Store Album Sales (Billboard)	2

Chart (2017)	Peak position
Australian Albums (ARIA)	7
Austrian Albums (Ö3 Austria)	14
Canadian Albums (Billboard)	24
Czech Albums (ČNS IFPI)	19
Danish Albums (Hitlisten)	33
Finnish Albums (Suomen virallinen lista)	18
German Albums (Offizielle Top 100)	22
Irish Albums (IRMA)	19
Italian Albums (FIMI)	18
New Zealand Albums (RMNZ)	18
Polish Albums (ZPAV)	45
Scottish Albums (Official Charts)	31
Swedish Albums (Sverigetopplistan)	22
Swiss Albums (Romandie)	23
Swiss Albums (Schweizer Hitparade)	25
UK Albums (Official Charts)	15
UK Rock & Metal Albums (Official Charts)	3
US Billboard 200	27
US Top Alternative Albums (Billboard)	7
US Top Catalog Albums (Billboard)	3
US Top Hard Rock Albums (Billboard)	4
US Top Rock Albums (Billboard)	7

=== Year-end charts ===
Chart (2007)	Position
Australian Albums (ARIA)	12
Austrian Albums (Ö3 Austria)	5
Belgian Albums (Ultratop Flanders)	24
Belgian Alternative Albums (Ultratop Flanders)	12
Belgian Albums (Ultratop Wallonia)	19
Dutch Albums (Album Top 100)	55
European Albums (Billboard)	5
Finnish Albums (Suomen viralinen lista)	3
French Albums (SNEP)	32
German Albums (Offizielle Top 100)	3
Hungarian Albums (MAHASZ)	58
Italian Albums (FIMI)	17
Japanese Albums (Oricon)	27
Mexican Albums (Top 100 Mexico)	54
New Zealand Albums (RMNZ)	5
Swedish Albums (Sverigetopplistan)	35
Swedish Albums & Compilations (Sverigetopplistan)	42
Swiss Albums (Schweizer Hitparade)	5
UK Albums (OCC)	44
US Billboard 200	10
US Top Rock Albums (Billboard)	3
Worldwide Albums (IFPI)	6

Chart (2008)	Position
Australian Albums (ARIA)	74
Austrian Albums (Ö3 Austria)	35
European Albums (Billboard)	50
French Albums (SNEP)	138
German Albums (Offizielle Top 100)	28
Swiss Albums (Schweizer Hitparade)	87
UK Albums (OCC)	154
US Billboard 200	46
US Hard Rock Albums (Billboard)	8
US Top Rock Albums (Billboard)	13

Chart (2009)	Position
US Catalog Albums (Billboard)	33
US Hard Rock Albums (Billboard)	13

Chart (2025)	Position
Belgian Albums (Ultratop Flanders)	177
German Albums (Offizielle Top 100)	89

=== Decade-end charts ===
Chart (2000–09)	Position
US Billboard 200	154

== Certifications and sales ==
Region	Certification	Certified units/sales
Australia (ARIA)	3× Platinum	210,000^{^}
Austria (IFPI Austria)	2× Platinum	40,000^{*}
Belgium (BRMA)	Gold	15,000^{*}
Canada (Music Canada)	4× Platinum	400,000^{‡}
Denmark (IFPI Danmark)	2× Platinum	40,000^{‡}
Finland (Musiikkituottajat)	Gold	15,893
France (SNEP)	Gold	75,000^{*}
Germany (BVMI)	9× Gold	900,000^{‡}
Greece (IFPI Greece)	Gold	7,500^{^}
Hungary (MAHASZ)	Gold	3,000^{^}
Italy (FIMI) sales since 2009	Platinum	50,000^{‡}
Japan (RIAJ)	Platinum	250,000^{^}
New Zealand (RMNZ)	4× Platinum	60,000^{‡}
Poland (ZPAV)	Gold	10,000^{*}
Portugal (AFP)	Platinum	20,000^{^}
Russia (NFPF)	Gold	10,000^{*}
Singapore (RIAS)	3× Platinum	30,000^{*}
Spain (Promusicae)	Gold	40,000^{^}
Sweden (GLF)	Gold	20,000^{^}
Switzerland (IFPI Switzerland)	2× Platinum	60,000^{^}
United Kingdom (BPI)	2× Platinum	600,000^{‡}
United States (RIAA)	5× Platinum	5,000,000^{‡}
Summaries
Europe (IFPI)	2× Platinum	2,000,000^{*}
^{*} Sales figures based on certification alone.^{^} Shipments figures based on certification alone.^{‡} Sales+streaming figures based on certification alone.
