= Bleed It Out =

2007 single by Linkin Park

Single by Linkin Park

from the album Minutes to Midnight
- B-side: "What I've Done" (Distorted Remix); "Given Up" (Third Encore Session)
- Released: August 17, 2007
- Recorded: 2007
- Studio: The Mansion, Los Angeles
- Genre: Rap rock
- Length: 2:44
- Label: Warner Bros.
- Composer: Linkin Park
- Lyricists: Chester Bennington; Mike Shinoda
- Producers: Rick Rubin; Mike Shinoda

Linkin Park singles chronology
"What I've Done" (2007)	"Bleed It Out" (2007)	"Shadow of the Day" (2007)

Audio sample
- file; help

Music video
- "Bleed It Out" on YouTube "Bleed It Out (Live at Milton Keynes)" on YouTube

"Bleed It Out" is a song by American rock band Linkin Park. The song was released as the second single from their third studio album, Minutes to Midnight. The single was released on August 17, 2007.

On July 30, 2007, the music video was shown on MTV Germany and MTV Asia and has premiered in Canada through the Muchmusic Countdown and their MuchAxs video streaming website. This song was #44 on Rolling Stone's list of the 100 Best Songs of 2007. This song was also #83 on MTV Asia's list of Top 100 Hits of 2007.

The song is featured in the closing video package in Game 3 of the 2007 World Series, and in the main setlist for the rhythm video game Guitar Hero: Warriors of Rock.

"Bleed It Out" was first performed live during the show at Webster Hall in New York City on May 11, 2007. Other notable live performances of the song include when it was performed in Tokyo on July 7, 2007, and broadcast as part of Live Earth, The Concerts for a Climate in Crisis, as well as when it was performed on the May 12, 2007, episode of Saturday Night Live.

== Music video ==
Linkin Park performs in the bar fight scene of the music video

The song's music video was directed by Joe Hahn and premiered on July 31, 2007, on MTV Germany. The music video was premiered in the United States on August 6, 2007, all day long on MTV2's "Unleashed". It also had a premiere on TRL the same day as MTV2's "Unleashed". It debuted at number 27 on the Muchmusic Countdown on August 3. Although "Leave Out All The Rest" (the track before it) features footsteps and an opening door that segues into "Bleed It Out", it was omitted for the music video. The video was filmed and then reversed (in what appears to be one continuous shot), although green screens were used to make it look like the band was still playing regularly. The video features a reversed bar fight, and at the end of the video, it is revealed that a person vomited on another person's shoe, which started the massive fight.

The video was named Muchmusic's #1 Rock video of 2007 during their annual Holiday Wrap specialty program series. Also, at the 2008 MuchMusic Video Awards, "Bleed It Out" won for Best International Video – Group.

Warner Bros. Records released a live video of "Bleed it Out" exclusively on their YouTube channel. The live video was shot in Japan on July 7, 2007, when Linkin Park was performing during the Live Earth concert.

== Commercial performance ==
The song ranked in music charts even before its official release. The song peaked at #52 on the Billboard US Hot 100 and #54 on the Billboard Pop 100. Although the song is the band's first charting single on Modern Rock Tracks to not reach the #1 spot since "Pts.Of.Athrty" in 2002 stalled at #29, it did however hold the #2 spot on the chart for nine consecutive weeks then got replaced by Three Days Grace's Never Too Late at the #2 spot, being held off from the #1 spot by Foo Fighters' "The Pretender". It also reached #3 on the Mainstream Rock Tracks charts. In the UK, it debuted and peaked at #29. It made the top thirty in Australia, Canada, Poland and Israel. To date, it has been less successful than its predecessor "What I've Done" that debuted at #1 on the Modern Rock Tracks chart and the following single "Shadow of the Day" where both singles charted higher. However, it has peaked higher than "What I've Done" in the New Zealand Singles Chart (#7) and Belgian Singles Chart (#22). Additionally, it was more successful on the Mainstream Rock Tracks and the Modern Rock Tracks chart than the other singles from Minutes to Midnight staying at 36 weeks on the Modern Rock Tracks chart, making it their third most successful single behind "In The End" (44 weeks) and "Faint" (37 weeks) on the rock charts.

As of June 2014, "Bleed It Out" has sold over 1,920,000 copies in the US, making it the band's 7th highest selling single of all time in the US.

== Track listings ==
All tracks are written by Linkin Park.

CD
No.	Title	Length
1.	"Bleed It Out"	2:44
2.	"Given Up" (Third Encore Session)	3:08

All tracks are written by Linkin Park.

Australian Maxi single • iTunes EP
No.	Title	Length
1.	"Bleed It Out"	2:44
2.	"What I've Done" (Distorted Remix)	3:47
3.	"Given Up" (Third Encore Session)	3:08

All tracks are written by Linkin Park.

7" picture disc
No.	Title	Length
1.	"Bleed It Out"	2:44
2.	"What I've Done" (Distorted Remix)	3:47

== Charts ==
=== Weekly charts ===
2007–2008 weekly chart performance for "Bleed It Out"
Chart (2007–2008)	Peak position
Australia (ARIA)	24
Austria (Ö3 Austria Top 40)	43
Belgium (Ultratip Bubbling Under Flanders)	22
Belgium (Ultratip Bubbling Under Wallonia)	7
Canada Hot 100 (Billboard)	22
Canada Rock (Billboard)	3
Czech Republic Airplay (ČNS IFPI)	5
Germany (GfK)	40
Ireland (IRMA)	43
Netherlands (Dutch Top 40 Tipparade)	11
Netherlands (Single Top 100)	79
New Zealand (Recorded Music NZ)	7
Scottish Singles Sales (Official Charts)	20
Slovakia Airplay (ČNS IFPI)	68
Sweden (Sverigetopplistan)	14
Switzerland (Schweizer Hitparade)	42
UK Singles (Official Charts)	29
UK Rock & Metal (Official Charts)	1
US Billboard Hot 100	52
US Alternative Airplay (Billboard)	2
US Mainstream Rock (Billboard)	3
US Pop 100 (Billboard)	54

2017 weekly chart performance for "Bleed It Out"
Chart (2017)	Peak position
Hungary (Single Top 40)	35
Portugal (AFP)	87
US Hot Rock & Alternative Songs (Billboard)	16

=== Year-end charts ===
Year-end chart performance for "Bleed It Out"
Chart (2008)	Position
US Alternative Airplay (Billboard)	13
US Mainstream Rock (Billboard)	15

== Certifications ==
Certifications and sales for "Bleed It Out"
Region	Certification	Certified units/sales
Denmark (IFPI Danmark)	Gold	45,000^{‡}
Germany (BVMI)	Platinum	600,000^{‡}
Italy (FIMI)	Gold	25,000^{‡}
New Zealand (RMNZ)	3× Platinum	90,000^{‡}
Spain (Promusicae)	Gold	30,000^{‡}
United Kingdom (BPI)	Platinum	638,000
United States (RIAA)	4× Platinum	4,000,000^{‡}
^{‡} Sales+streaming figures based on certification alone.
