= Leave Out All the Rest =

2008 single by Linkin Park

Single by Linkin Park

from the album Minutes to Midnight
- B-side: "In Pieces" (live); "Leave Out All the Rest" (live); "L.O.A.T.R." (remix)
- Released: July 14, 2008
- Studio: The Mansion (Los Angeles)
- Genre: Alternative rock
- Length: 3:29 (album version); 3:19 (single version)
- Label: Warner Bros.
- Composer: Linkin Park
- Lyricists: Chester Bennington; Mike Shinoda
- Producers: Rick Rubin; Mike Shinoda

Linkin Park singles chronology
"We Made It" (2008)	"Leave Out All the Rest" (2008)	"New Divide" (2009)

Music video
- "Leave Out All the Rest" on YouTube

"Leave Out All the Rest" is a single by the American rock band Linkin Park, released as the fifth and final single from their third album, Minutes to Midnight. Because of the song's popularity of digital sales during the release week of the album, the power ballad charted in the Billboard Pop 100 for that week. It was featured on the original motion picture soundtrack for the 2008 film Twilight during the end credits. On the album, the song segues into "Bleed It Out". The single was released on July 15, 2008.

== Background ==
The song's working titles were "Fear" and "When My Time Comes" according to the booklet. While writing, the group went through over thirty lyrical variations before completing the album version. The song combines various synths and samples with raw guitars and drums and powerful vocals. A demo which features Mike Shinoda doing lead vocals can be heard on the Making of Minutes to Midnight documentary, as well as the Linkin Park Underground 9.0 CD where it is entitled "Fear". The song starts with a string sample and electric piano intro, followed by the verse. At the end of the song of the album version, a crowd can be heard which leads into "Bleed It Out", a song that features the background sound of a crowd throughout.

In a Kerrang! review/interview of the band, and the album, vocalist Chester Bennington said about the song, "We knew this was going to be a single from the very beginning, so we worked really hard on making sure it had great lyrics. I'm singing 'pretending someone else can come and save me from myself' during it because it's supposed to feel like an apology letter, as though I'm moving on but I want people to remember the good things and not the bad things. A lot of the song is about humility." Mike Shinoda has also stated that Rick Rubin (producer for Minutes to Midnight) was the first to have said "This sounds like a massive single".

== Media appearances ==
The intro to the song was featured on an English advert for the US television series Law & Order for Sky One.

It was also featured on the original motion picture soundtrack for the 2008 film Twilight. It is played during the end credits. Also, the performance from "Road to Revolution" is available on the Twilight special edition DVD.

"Leave Out All the Rest" was the title of a CSI episode that aired on November 6, 2008. The band made a deal with CBS to work the song into the episode. It contained several elements of the song throughout, and pieces of the verses, as well as the chorus, were played at the opening and end of the episode.

In 2009 the German action-series Alarm für Cobra 11 used a part of the song (the chorus) in an especially sad scene. It was the fourth time that a Linkin Park title was used in the series.

== Music video ==
Screenshot from the official music video

In an interview with MTV, Mike said that the video, directed by bandmate Joe Hahn, takes place in a futuristic, science fiction influenced setting, and depicts what the daily life of the band's members would be like if they lived in outer space. The band lives in a rundown, artificial habitat that is making its way across the galaxy. At first, they are seen passing the time performing mundane tasks, but then gravity is lost on board the vessel, sending the members floating into what looks like the Sun or a star. The video features no performance footage, though Chester Bennington is seen singing during most of his solo scenes. The video has respectively been influenced by the British movie Sunshine, borrowing similar imagery and a similar concept. Hahn said:

We're explorers in space, just like when we go on tour. We're leaving our home life behind, and I guess it kind of ties into 'Leave Out All the Rest', in that we have to leave things behind in order to do something better.

The video leaked on May 30, 2008, the same day the band released a statement on their widget at MySpace, saying that the premiere for the video would be on June 2, 2008. It featured in the top ten songs of the week on VH1.

== Commercial performance ==
The song managed to spend one week on the Billboard Pop 100 without being officially released as a single, at #98. The song debuted on the US Billboard Hot Modern Rock Tracks at #35 and peaked at #11. It is one of Linkin Park's lowest charting songs in the UK to date, peaking at #90, as well as on the Billboard Modern Rock chart, peaking at only #11. "Leave Out All the Rest" debuted on the Billboard Hot 100 at #99 and the Billboard Hot Digital Songs at #72. The single would later peak on the Billboard Hot 100 at #94. Despite its mediocre chart performance, the single was certified Platinum by the RIAA in 2017. Despite the song charting poorly in the UK, it would eventually be certified silver by the BPI for 200,000 units sold in December 2021.

== Track listings ==
CD single • iTunes single
No.	Title	Length
1.	"Leave Out All the Rest"	3:19
2.	"In Pieces" (Live from Projekt Revolution, Washington DC, Aug 19 '07)	3:47

All tracks are written by Linkin Park.

Maxi single
No.	Title	Length
1.	"Leave Out All the Rest"	3:19
2.	"In Pieces" (Live from Projekt Revolution, Washington DC, Aug 19 '07)	3:47
3.	"Leave Out All the Rest" (Live from Projekt Revolution, Detroit MI, Aug 22 '07)	3:26
4.	"Leave Out All the Rest" (Video)

All tracks are written by Linkin Park.

Japanese single
No.	Title	Length
1.	"Leave Out All the Rest"	3:19
2.	"Leave Out All the Rest" (Live from Projekt Revolution, Detroit MI, Aug 22 '07)	3:26
3.	"L.O.A.T.R." (M. Shinoda Remix)	3:46
4.	"Leave Out All the Rest" (Video)	3:25
5.	"Leave Out All the Rest" (Live Video)	3:27

All tracks are written by Linkin Park.

iTunes EP
No.	Title	Length
1.	"Leave Out All the Rest"	3:19
2.	"In Pieces" (Live from Projekt Revolution, Washington DC, Aug 19 '07)	3:47
3.	"Leave Out All the Rest" (Live from Projekt Revolution, Detroit MI, Aug 22 '07)	3:26

== Charts ==
=== Weekly charts ===
2008–2009 weekly chart performance for "Leave Out All the Rest"
Chart (2008–2009)	Peak position
Australia (ARIA)	24
Austria (Ö3 Austria Top 40)	17
Belgium (Ultratip Bubbling Under Wallonia)	12
Canada Rock (Billboard)	39
Czech Republic Airplay (ČNS IFPI)	12
Finland (Suomen virallinen lista)	19
Germany (GfK)	15
Japan (Oricon)	147
Netherlands (Dutch Top 40 Tipparade)	5
New Zealand (Recorded Music NZ)	38
Portugal Airplay (AFP)	5
Scottish Singles Sales (Official Charts)	36
Slovakia Airplay (ČNS IFPI)	12
Sweden (Sverigetopplistan)	42
Switzerland (Schweizer Hitparade)	36
Turkey Top 20 (Billboard)	9
UK Singles (Official Charts)	90
UK Rock & Metal (Official Charts)	2
US Billboard Hot 100	94
US Adult Pop Airplay (Billboard)	23
US Alternative Airplay (Billboard)	11
US Mainstream Rock (Billboard)	33
US Pop 100 (Billboard)	69

2017 weekly chart performance for "Leave Out All the Rest"
Chart (2017)	Peak position
Czech Republic Singles Digital (ČNS IFPI)	80
US Hot Rock & Alternative Songs (Billboard)	22

=== Year-end charts ===
2008 year-end chart performance for "Leave Out All the Rest"
Chart (2008)	Position
Germany (Media Control GfK)	95

== Certifications ==
Certifications and sales for "Leave Out All the Rest"
Region	Certification	Certified units/sales
Germany (BVMI)	Gold	300,000^{‡}
New Zealand (RMNZ)	Gold	15,000^{‡}
United Kingdom (BPI)	Silver	200,000^{‡}
United States (RIAA)	Platinum	1,000,000^{‡}
^{‡} Sales+streaming figures based on certification alone.

== Release history ==
Release dates and formats for "Leaving Out All the Rest"
Region	Date	Format	Label(s)	Ref.
United States	August 25, 2008	Mainstream airplay	Warner Bros.	

== Cover versions ==
American rock band Major Moment covered a version of the song.
