= List of songs in Guitar Hero: Warriors of Rock =

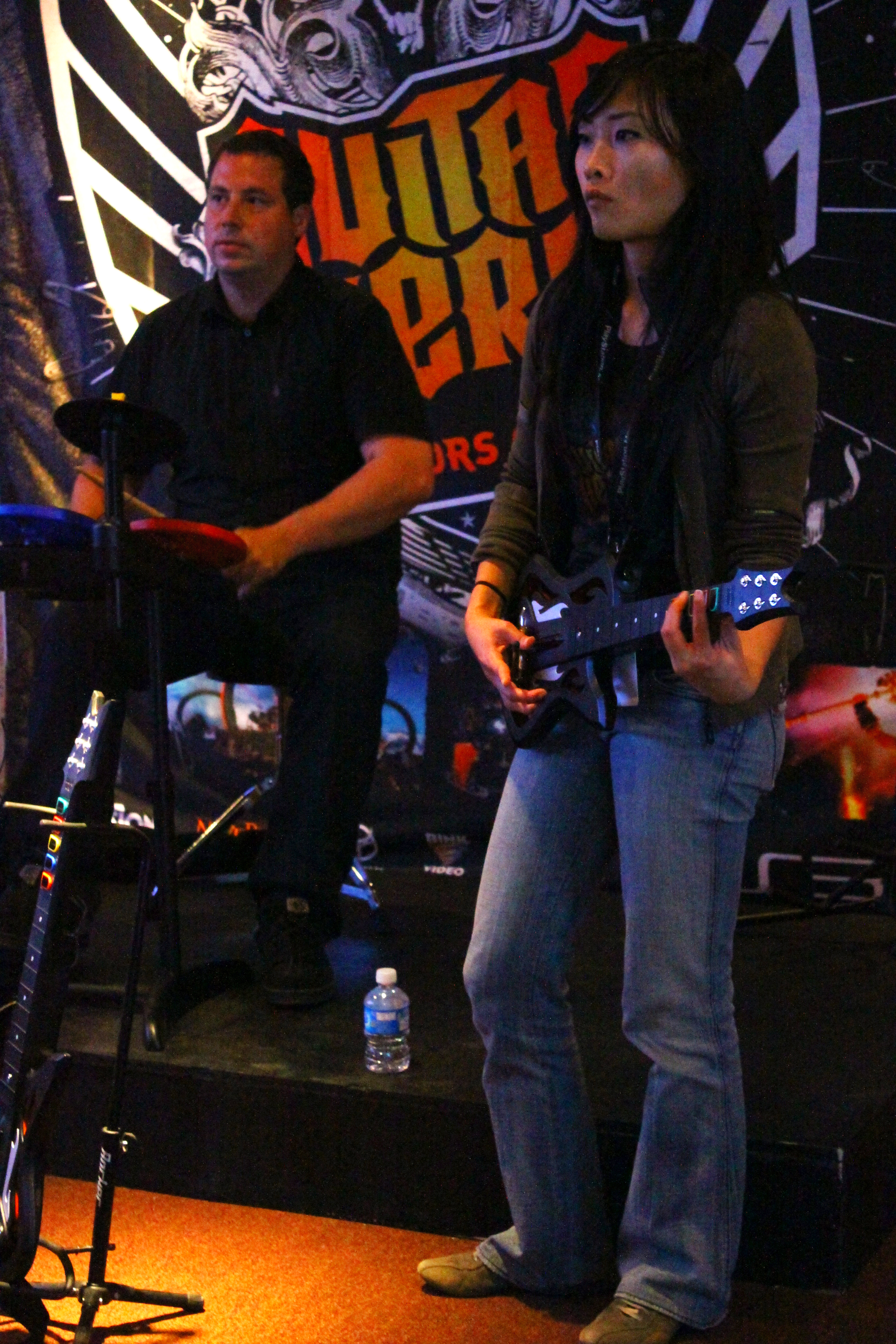
Two people playing Guitar Hero: Warriors of Rock at a trade show. The person on the right is using the new design of the Guitar Hero controller created specifically for the game.

Guitar Hero: Warriors of Rock is the sixth main game in the Guitar Hero series, released by Activision to the Xbox 360, PlayStation 3, and Wii consoles in September 2010. The game was developed by Activision's subsidiary studios RedOctane, Neversoft, and Vicarious Visions; the latter provided support for additional features in the Wii version of the game. Following a decline in sales of music games in 2009, partially due to the large number of music games released that year, Activision scaled back their efforts in the Guitar Hero series. Warriors of Rock represents the final game developed by RedOctane and Neversoft. Both studios' respective Guitar Hero divisions were closed once the game was complete, with key personnel brought into Activision directly for future games. It was initially announced that Vicarious Visions would take over future game development of the Guitar Hero series, however due to declining music game sales, all further development of the Guitar Hero series was cancelled, until 2015 when Guitar Hero Live was released.

As with previous games in the series, Warriors of Rock challenges one to four local or online players to use special instrument controllers based on guitar, bass, drums, and vocals to simulate the playing of rock music, matching notes as they scroll on-screen with specific actions of the controller to score points and successfully complete songs that are available on-disc, through imports of other Guitar Hero games, or purchasable as downloadable content. Players are awarded star ratings based on their performance; in Warriors of Rock, the typical limit of five stars can easily be surpassed through gameplay-changing powers possessed by the eight in-game characters when they are used. Players can opt to play songs on one of six difficulty levels, from Beginner to Expert (Expert+ on drums), that alter the number of notes and scrolling speed.

== Main setlist ==
There are 93 songs by 85 artists on-disc for Warriors of Rock. Recent games in the Guitar Hero series were found to have soundtracks that attempted to please several types of players, leading to dilution of the experience; Warriors of Rock was designed to follow the success of Guitar Hero III: Legends of Rock with a soundtrack that was more focused on the rock 'n roll genre, according to project director Brian Bright. The game features songs primarily from the punk, alternative, and classic rock genres, and with heavy focus on lead guitar portions as this was found to be the most popular instrument to players. The game's on-disc setlist is also claimed to be more difficult than previous games, as Activision found most players would quickly progress to the highest difficulty, Expert, shortly after each game's release. Bright noted that "there's still range and still a lot of variety in this game" to avoid too much alienating of long-time fans of the series in general.

Warriors of Rock's primary gameplay mode is "Quest Mode", a story-driven campaign in which players recruit eight fictional characters to help rescue the Demigod of Rock from imprisonment by The Beast; the story is narrated by Gene Simmons. For each character, the player must earn a number of stars on a selection of songs tied to each character that represented the genre the character personifies; for example, the mohawk-wearing Johnny Napalm has songs primarily from the punk genre. After achieving the required number of stars, the character transforms into a more powerful character, and the player must complete one more song (the "encore") to recruit the character. That character will then join in the fight against the Beast, and the opportunity to recruit other characters become available. One highlight of Quest Mode's story involves finding the Demigod's guitar in a cave; this part of the story is set to match the lyrics of Rush's 7-part epic, "2112", with Rush members Geddy Lee, Neil Peart, and Alex Lifeson narrating the story. Outside Quest Mode, on-disc songs can be played at any time in "Quickplay+ Mode", an expanded version of previous games' Quickplay modes featuring more challenges, and various competitive and cooperative multiplayer modes. The parts of "2112" and many of the songs in the last part of the Quest progress are only available after being completed in Quest Mode.

All songs in Guitar Hero: Warriors of Rock are master recordings. Two songs, Alice Cooper's "No More Mr. Nice Guy" and The Runaways' "Cherry Bomb", were specifically re-recorded by the original performers for use in Warriors of Rock. The song "Black Rain" by Soundgarden represents the first single by the group since 1997, and the release of the game was planned in coordination with Soundgarden's Telephantasm compilation album that includes the single. Megadeth's "Sudden Death" was specifically written by Dave Mustaine as the final song within Warriors of Rock's setlist; its polyrhythms and difficult passes make it one of the toughest songs to beat.

Reviewers found the soundtrack to lack the focus that Activision claims it has, and that the series may have exhausted a number of good guitar songs in its previous iterations. Arthur Gies of IGN stated that the game soundtrack "may be the most uneven collection in any of the main Guitar Hero titles", citing problems with "a surplus of tracks that seem out of place", "too many songs that are just boring to play", and "a number of synth heavy songs that are nevertheless shoehorned" into the game. Official Xbox Magazine UK stated that the setlist "feels at times uninspired, incongruous and uninteresting". Game Informer's Matt Helgeson felt that the setlist was "a mixed bag", with a strong and balanced set of songs in the early tiers of Quest Mode, while the latter, more difficult songs were "terrible and felt like a chore" to complete. Roger Hargreaves of Metro commented that "with so many of the more iconic rock songs having already been used in previous Guitar Hero and Rock Band games developers are forced to use ever more obscure songs and/or acts". On the other hand, USA Today's Mike Snider claimed that the game's soundtrack "gave [him] a reason to blast music on [his] stereo", and besides providing well-known songs and bands, introduced him to new bands.

The on-disc songs are presented in the following table by their year of recording, song name and artist, their genre as defined in-game, and the set or tier within the Quest Mode where they appear.

Year	Song	Artist(s)	Genre	Quest Mode setlist
2009	"Again"	Flyleaf	Modern Rock	2. Echo Tesla
1971	"Aqualung"^{a}	Jethro Tull	Classic Rock	8. Casey Lynch
2005	"Bat Country"^{a}	Avenged Sevenfold	Heavy Metal	9. Axel Steel; Encore
1990	"Been Caught Stealing"^{a}	Jane's Addiction	Alternative	3. Judy Nails; Encore
2010	"Black Rain"	Soundgarden	Grunge	1. Johnny Napalm
2007	"Black Widow of La Porte"^{a}^{c}	John 5 featuring Jim Root	Heavy Metal	11. Demigod of Rock
2007	"Bleed It Out"	Linkin Park	Rap Rock	2. Echo Tesla
2009	"Bloodlines"^{a}	Dethklok	Melodic Death Metal	7. Lars Ümlaüt
2001	"Bodies"^{a}	Drowning Pool	Nu Metal	6. Pandora; Encore
1975	"Bohemian Rhapsody"	Queen	Classic Rock	3. Judy Nails
1974	"Burn"	Deep Purple	Hard Rock	9. Axel Steel
1981	"Burnin' for You"	Blue Öyster Cult	Classic Rock	4. Austin Tejas
1974	"Call Me the Breeze" (Live)	Lynyrd Skynyrd	Southern Rock	8. Casey Lynch
2007	"Calling"^{a}	Strung Out	Modern Rock	7. Lars Ümlaüt
1984	"Chemical Warfare"^{a}	Slayer	Thrash Metal	11. Demigod of Rock
2010	"Cherry Bomb"^{a}^{b}	The Runaways	Hard Rock	1. Johnny Napalm
1971	"Children of the Grave"^{a}	Black Sabbath	Heavy Metal	4. Austin Tejas; Encore
1993	"Cryin'"^{a}	Aerosmith	Blues Rock	4. Austin Tejas
2005	"Dance, Dance"^{a}	Fall Out Boy	Alternative	6. Pandora
2003	"Dancing Through Sunday"^{a}	AFI	Alternative	7. Lars Ümlaüt
1997	"Deadfall"	Snot	Hardcore Punk	11. Demigod of Rock
1989	"Fascination Street"	The Cure	Alternative	3. Judy Nails
2008	"The Feel Good Drag"^{a}	Anberlin	Modern Rock	6. Pandora
1977	"Feels Like the First Time"^{a}	Foreigner	Classic Rock	8. Casey Lynch
1969	"Fortunate Son"	Creedence Clearwater Revival	Southern Rock	4. Austin Tejas
1972	"Free Ride"^{a}	The Edgar Winter Group	Classic Rock	4. Austin Tejas
2004	"Fury of the Storm"^{a}	DragonForce	Power Metal	11. Demigod of Rock
2002	"Get Free"^{a}	The Vines	Alternative	2. Echo Tesla
2010	"Ghost"^{a}	Slash featuring Ian Astbury	Hard Rock	9. Axel Steel
1997	"Graduate"^{a}	Third Eye Blind	Alternative	3. Judy Nails
2009	"Hard to See"^{a}	Five Finger Death Punch	Hard Rock	7. Lars Ümlaüt
1990	"Holy Wars... The Punishment Due"^{a}	Megadeth	Thrash Metal	10. Battle With The Beast
2001	"How You Remind Me"^{a}	Nickelback	Hard Rock	3. Judy Nails
2009	"I Know What I Am"	Band of Skulls	Indie Rock	2. Echo Tesla
1994	"I'm Broken"^{a}	Pantera	Groove Metal	7. Lars Ümlaüt
2004	"I'm Not Okay (I Promise)"	My Chemical Romance	Pop Punk	6. Pandora
2005	"If You Want Peace... Prepare for War"^{a}	Children of Bodom	Melodic Death Metal	11. Demigod of Rock
1987	"Indians"^{a}	Anthrax	Thrash Metal	9. Axel Steel
1994	"Interstate Love Song"^{a}	Stone Temple Pilots	Alternative	3. Judy Nails
2009	"It's Only Another Parsec..."^{a}	RX Bandits	Modern Rock	6. Pandora
1990	"Jet City Woman"^{a}	Queensrÿche	Hard Rock	9. Axel Steel
2009	"Lasso"	Phoenix	Alternative	2. Echo Tesla
1978	"Listen to Her Heart"^{a}	Tom Petty and the Heartbreakers	Classic Rock	4. Austin Tejas
1991	"Losing My Religion"	R.E.M.	Alternative	3. Judy Nails
1977	"Love Gun"^{a}	Kiss	Glam Rock	8. Casey Lynch
1981	"Lunatic Fringe"	Red Rider	Rock	4. Austin Tejas
1994	"Machinehead"^{a}	Bush	Post-Grunge	2. Echo Tesla
1986	"Modern Day Cowboy"	Tesla	Classic Rock	9. Axel Steel
1985	"Money for Nothing"^{a}	Dire Straits	Pop Rock	4. Austin Tejas
2001	"Motivation"	Sum 41	Pop Punk	1. Johnny Napalm
1978	"Move It On Over" (Live)^{a}	George Thorogood and the Destroyers	Blues Rock	8. Casey Lynch
2005	"Nemesis"^{a}	Arch Enemy	Melodic Death Metal	11. Demigod of Rock
1973	"No More Mr. Nice Guy" ^{b}	Alice Cooper	Classic Rock	8. Casey Lynch
2005	"No Way Back"	Foo Fighters	Post-Grunge	3. Judy Nails
2003	"The Outsider"^{a}	A Perfect Circle	Alternative	6. Pandora
2009	"Paranoid" (Live)	Metallica & Ozzy Osbourne	Heavy Metal	7. Lars Ümlaüt; Encore
1987	"Pour Some Sugar on Me" (Live)	Def Leppard	Glam Metal	9. Axel Steel
2008	"Psychosocial"^{a}	Slipknot	Nu Metal	7. Lars Ümlaüt
2009	"Ravenous"^{a}	Atreyu	Metalcore	7. Lars Ümlaüt
1987	"Re-Ignition" (Live)^{a}	Bad Brains	Punk	1. Johnny Napalm
1978	"Renegade"^{a}	Styx	Hard Rock	8. Casey Lynch; Encore
1983	"(You Can Still) Rock in America"	Night Ranger	Rock	9. Axel Steel
1989	"Rockin' in the Free World"	Neil Young	Classic Rock	4. Austin Tejas
2008	"Savior"^{a}	Rise Against	Melodic Hardcore	6. Pandora
2009	"Scumbag Blues"	Them Crooked Vultures	Alternative	8. Casey Lynch
1994	"Self Esteem"	The Offspring	Pop Punk	1. Johnny Napalm
2004	"Setting Fire to Sleeping Giants"^{a}	The Dillinger Escape Plan	Mathcore	11. Demigod of Rock
2003	"Seven Nation Army"	The White Stripes	Blues Rock	3. Judy Nails
1983	"Sharp Dressed Man" (Live)^{a}	ZZ Top	Blues Rock	8. Casey Lynch
2004	"Slow Hands"	Interpol	Alternative	2. Echo Tesla
2010	"Speeding (Vault Version)"^{a}^{b}^{c}	Steve Vai	Speed Metal	11. Demigod of Rock
1968	"Stray Cat Blues"	The Rolling Stones	Blues Rock	4. Austin Tejas
2010	"Sudden Death"^{a}	Megadeth	Thrash Metal	10. Battle With The Beast; Final Encore
2009	"Suffocated"	Orianthi	Modern Rock	6. Pandora
1995	"Theme from Spiderman"	Ramones	Punk	1. Johnny Napalm; Encore
2009	"There's No Secrets This Year"	Silversun Pickups	Indie Rock	6. Pandora
2009	"This Day We Fight!"^{a}	Megadeth	Thrash Metal	10. Battle With The Beast; Battle Encore
2007	"Tick Tick Boom"	The Hives	Garage Punk	2. Echo Tesla
2007	"Ties That Bind"^{a}	Alter Bridge	Hard Rock	7. Lars Umlaut
1992	"Tones of Home"^{a}	Blind Melon	Alternative	3. Judy Nails
1976	"2112 Pt. 1 – Overture"^{a}	Rush	Prog Rock	5. Legendary Guitar Stage
1976	"2112 Pt. 2 – The Temples of Syrinx"^{a}	Rush	Prog Rock	5. Legendary Guitar Stage
1976	"2112 Pt. 3 – Discovery"^{c}	Rush	Prog Rock	5. Legendary Guitar Stage
1976	"2112 Pt. 4 – Presentation"^{a}	Rush	Prog Rock	5. Legendary Guitar Stage
1976	"2112 Pt. 5 – Oracle: The Dream"	Rush	Prog Rock	5. Legendary Guitar Stage
1976	"2112 Pt. 6 – Soliloquy"^{a}	Rush	Prog Rock	5. Legendary Guitar Stage
1976	"2112 Pt. 7 – Grand Finale"^{a}	Rush	Prog Rock	5. Legendary Guitar Stage
1990	"Unskinny Bop"^{a}	Poison	Glam Rock	9. Axel Steel
2009	"Uprising"	Muse	Alternative	2. Echo Tesla; Encore
2009	"Waidmanns Heil"^{a}	Rammstein	Industrial	7. Lars Ümlaüt
1984	"We're Not Gonna Take It"^{a}	Twisted Sister	Glam Metal	1. Johnny Napalm
1978	"What Do I Get?"	Buzzcocks	Punk	1. Johnny Napalm
1992	"Wish"	Nine Inch Nails	Industrial	2. Echo Tesla

^a Song contains Expert+ parts (double bass drum and ghost notes) for drums. ^b Song has been re-recorded for the game. ^c Song does not have parts for one or more instruments.

=== Importable content ===
Warriors of Rock allows for importing a majority of songs from four previous Guitar Hero games into the game's Quickplay+ and other competitive modes; the import requires a one-time fee and includes necessary updates to previous songs to match new formats within Warriors of Rock. Just prior to Warriors of Rock's release, it was announced that thirty-nine songs from Guitar Hero: Metallica would also be importable into the game, with the import fee waived during the first week of release.

=== Downloadable content ===
Warriors of Rock provides the capacity to purchase more songs that can be played in the game alongside the on-disc soundtrack through downloadable content for each console. All previous downloadable content that worked with Guitar Hero 5 can be played within Warriors of Rock. Following Activision's February 2011 decision to shutter their Guitar Hero development, no further downloadable content will be forthcoming for the title. Due to "continued support" from their fanbase, Activision continued to release downloadable content for the game through March and April 2011 with packs that were in the works prior to this.

Initial shipments of the game in the United States are also bundled with Soundgarden's latest album, Telephantasm, which includes the new track "Black Rain" and other previous Soundgarden songs; "Black Rain" is available on the Warriors of Rock disc to play, while the remaining eleven tracks on the album, songs from previous Soundgarden albums, were available as downloadable content alongside release of the game. Due to this bundling, Telephantasm became the first album to achieve "platinum" status from the Recording Industry Association of America for shipping over 1 million non-refunded albums due to the tie-in with a video-game product.

Year	Song title	Artist	Pack name	Genre	Release date
1987	"Hunted Down"^{a}	Soundgarden	Telephantasm	Grunge	September 28, 2010^{e}
1989	"Hands All Over"	Soundgarden	Telephantasm	Grunge	September 28, 2010^{e}
1991	"Outshined"	Soundgarden	Telephantasm	Grunge	September 28, 2010^{e}
1992	"Rusty Cage"^{a}	Soundgarden	Telephantasm	Grunge	September 28, 2010^{e}
1992	"Birth Ritual"^{a}	Soundgarden	Telephantasm	Grunge	September 28, 2010^{e}
1994	"Black Hole Sun"^{a}	Soundgarden	Telephantasm	Grunge	September 28, 2010^{e}
1994	"Spoonman"^{a}	Soundgarden	Telephantasm	Grunge	September 28, 2010^{e}
1994	"My Wave"^{a}	Soundgarden	Telephantasm	Grunge	September 28, 2010^{e}
1995	"Fell on Black Days"^{a}	Soundgarden	Telephantasm	Grunge	September 28, 2010^{e}
1996	"Burden in My Hand"^{a}	Soundgarden	Telephantasm	Grunge	September 28, 2010^{e}
1996	"Blow Up the Outside World"^{a}	Soundgarden	Telephantasm	Grunge	September 28, 2010^{e}
2010	"The Infection"^{a}	Disturbed	Rocktober Track Pack	Alternative Metal	October 12, 2010^{d}
2010	"Na Na Na"^{a}	My Chemical Romance	Rocktober Track Pack	Pop Punk	October 12, 2010^{d}
2009	"Resistance"^{a}	Muse	Rocktober Track Pack	Alternative	October 12, 2010^{d}
2010	"Blackout"	Linkin Park	A Thousand Suns	Rap Rock	October 19, 2010
2010	"Burning in the Skies"	Linkin Park	A Thousand Suns	Alternative	October 19, 2010
2010	"The Catalyst"	Linkin Park	A Thousand Suns	Alternative	October 19, 2010
2010	"The Messenger"^{c}	Linkin Park	A Thousand Suns	Alternative	October 19, 2010
2010	"Waiting for the End"^{a}	Linkin Park	A Thousand Suns	Rap Rock	October 19, 2010
2010	"Wretches and Kings"	Linkin Park	A Thousand Suns	Rap Rock	October 19, 2010
1975	"Hot Patootie"^{a}	The Rocky Horror Picture Show	Rocky Horror Picture Show Track Pack	Rock	October 26, 2010
1975	"Sweet Transvestite"^{a}	The Rocky Horror Picture Show	Rocky Horror Picture Show Track Pack	Rock	October 26, 2010
1975	"Time Warp"^{a}	The Rocky Horror Picture Show	Rocky Horror Picture Show Track Pack	Rock	October 26, 2010
1981	"Tom Sawyer"^{a}	Rush	Guitar Hero Warriors of Rock Pack 01	Prog Rock	November 9, 2010
1981	"Red Barchetta"^{a}	Rush	Guitar Hero Warriors of Rock Pack 01	Prog Rock	November 9, 2010
1981	"Limelight"^{a}	Rush	Guitar Hero Warriors of Rock Pack 01	Prog Rock	November 9, 2010
1989	"Love Song"^{a}	Tesla	Guitar Hero Warriors of Rock Pack 01	Classic Rock	November 9, 2010
1989	"Poison"^{a}	Alice Cooper	Guitar Hero Warriors of Rock Pack 01	Classic Rock	November 9, 2010
1973	"Elected"	Alice Cooper	Guitar Hero Warriors of Rock Pack 01	Classic Rock	November 9, 2010
2010	"We're All Gonna Die"	Slash (With Iggy Pop)	Guitar Hero Warriors of Rock Pack 01	Hard Rock	November 9, 2010
2010	"Nothing to Say"^{a}	Slash (With M. Shadows)	Guitar Hero Warriors of Rock Pack 01	Hard Rock	November 9, 2010
2010	"Watch This"^{a}^{c}	Slash (With Dave Grohl and Duff McKagan)	Guitar Hero Warriors of Rock Pack 01	Hard Rock	November 9, 2010
1986	"Talk Dirty To Me"	Poison	Guitar Hero Warriors of Rock Pack 01	Glam Rock	November 9, 2010
2006	"Teenagers"	My Chemical Romance	My Chemical Romance Track Pack	Pop Punk	November 23, 2010
2010	"Bulletproof Heart"	My Chemical Romance	My Chemical Romance Track Pack	Pop Punk	November 23, 2010
2006	"Welcome to the Black Parade"	My Chemical Romance	My Chemical Romance Track Pack	Pop Punk	November 23, 2010
2004	"Helena"	My Chemical Romance	My Chemical Romance Track Pack	Pop Punk	November 23, 2010
1995	"Name"	Goo Goo Dolls	90s Track Pack	Pop Rock	December 7, 2010
1996	"Real World"	Matchbox Twenty	90s Track Pack	Pop Rock	December 7, 2010
1994	"What's the Frequency, Kenneth?"	R.E.M.	90s Track Pack	Alternative	December 7, 2010
1997	"Sex and Candy"^{a}	Marcy Playground	90s Track Pack	Pop Rock	December 7, 2010
1994	"Plowed"	Sponge	90s Track Pack	Alternative	December 7, 2010
1976	"Detroit Rock City"	KISS	Kiss-mas Track Pack	Glam Rock	December 21, 2010
1976	"Calling Dr. Love"	KISS	Kiss-mas Track Pack	Glam Rock	December 21, 2010
1975	"Rock and Roll All Nite"^{f}	KISS	Kiss-mas Track Pack	Glam Rock	December 21, 2010
2010	"We've Got a Situation Here"^{a}	The Damned Things	January Mega Pack	Metal	January 11, 2011
2010	"2nd Sucks"^{a}	A Day to Remember	January Mega Pack	Post-Hardcore	January 11, 2011
2010	"All I Want"^{a}	A Day to Remember	January Mega Pack	Post-Hardcore	January 11, 2011
2009	"Downfall of Us All"^{a}	A Day to Remember	January Mega Pack	Post-Hardcore	January 11, 2011
1994	"Closer"	Nine Inch Nails	January Mega Pack	Industrial	January 11, 2011
2005	"The Hand That Feeds"	Nine Inch Nails	January Mega Pack	Industrial	January 11, 2011
2010	"Head Like a Hole"^{a}	Nine Inch Nails	January Mega Pack	Industrial	January 11, 2011
2002	"Buried Myself Alive"	The Used	January Mega Pack	Pop Rock	January 11, 2011
2008	"Rescue Me"	Hawthorne Heights	January Mega Pack	Alternative	January 11, 2011
2005	"Wings of a Butterfly"	HIM	January Mega Pack	Alternative	January 11, 2011
2010	"Parade of the Dead"^{a}	Black Label Society	February Mega Pack	Southern Metal	February 8, 2011^{g}
2010	"Crazy Horse"^{a}	Black Label Society	February Mega Pack	Southern Metal	February 8, 2011^{g}
2010	"Black Sunday"^{a}	Black Label Society	February Mega Pack	Southern Metal	February 8, 2011^{g}
2008	"Blooddrunk"^{a}	Children of Bodom	February Mega Pack	Melodic Death Metal	February 8, 2011^{g}
2005	"Living Dead Beat"^{a}	Children of Bodom	February Mega Pack	Melodic Death Metal	February 8, 2011^{g}
2011	"Was It Worth It?"^{a}	Children of Bodom	February Mega Pack	Melodic Death Metal	February 8, 2011^{g}
2010	"World on Fire"^{a}	Firewind	February Mega Pack	Metal	February 8, 2011^{g}
1994	"Get Your Gunn"	Marilyn Manson	February Mega Pack	Metal	February 8, 2011^{g}
1998	"Coma White"	Marilyn Manson	February Mega Pack	Metal	February 8, 2011^{g}
1996	"Tourniquet"	Marilyn Manson	February Mega Pack	Metal	February 8, 2011^{g}
2002	"Always"^{a}	Saliva	Modern Rock Mega Pack	Metal	March 8, 2011
2005	"Little Sister"	Queens of the Stone Age	Modern Rock Mega Pack	Hard Rock	March 8, 2011
2007	"Psycho"^{a}	Puddle of Mudd	Modern Rock Mega Pack	Alternative	March 8, 2011
2003	"Sic Transit Gloria... Glory Fades"^{a}	Brand New	Modern Rock Mega Pack	Pop Punk	March 8, 2011
2002	"Headstrong"^{a}	Trapt	Modern Rock Mega Pack	Alternative	March 8, 2011
2009	"She's a Genius"	Jet	Modern Rock Mega Pack	Alternative	March 8, 2011
2006	"Hands Open"	Snow Patrol	Modern Rock Mega Pack	Pop Rock	March 8, 2011
2002	"Sorrow"^{a}	Bad Religion	Modern Rock Mega Pack	Punk	March 8, 2011
2006	"Supermassive Black Hole"	Muse	Modern Rock Mega Pack	Alternative	March 8, 2011
2010	"New Low"^{a}	Middle Class Rut	Middle Class Rut Track Pack	Alternative	April 12, 2011
2010	"Lifelong Dayshift"^{a}	Middle Class Rut	Middle Class Rut Track Pack	Alternative	April 12, 2011
2010	"Sad to Know"^{a}	Middle Class Rut	Middle Class Rut Track Pack	Alternative	April 12, 2011
2009	"Ignorance"^{a}	Paramore	Emo Edge Track Pack	Pop Rock	April 12, 2011
2007	"That's What You Get"^{a}	Paramore	Emo Edge Track Pack	Pop Rock	April 12, 2011
2010	"Across 5 Oceans"^{a}	Madina Lake	Emo Edge Track Pack	Pop Rock	April 12, 2011
2010	"Hey Superstar"	Madina Lake	Emo Edge Track Pack	Pop Rock	April 12, 2011
2011	"Savor the Kill"^{a}, ^{h}	Darkest Hour	Darkest Hour Track Pack	Metal	April 12, 2011
2011	"Beyond the Life You Know"^{a}, ^{h}	Darkest Hour	Darkest Hour Track Pack	Metal	April 12, 2011
2007	"Doomsayer"^{a}, ^{h}	Darkest Hour	Darkest Hour Track Pack	Metal	April 12, 2011

^a Song contains Expert+ parts for drums.

^c Song does not have parts for one or more instruments.

^dExclusive to Xbox 360. Initially released for free to Xbox Live gold subscribers, before becoming paid downloadable content one week later.

^eInitially released as a single album pack, the Telephantasm album songs are available as individual songs beginning on October 26.

^fAlso available in the Guitar Hero Smash Hits import.

^g Released for the PS3 on the 2nd February in Europe.

^h Unavailable on the Wii.
