= A Thousand Suns World Tour =

2010–11 concert tour by Linkin Park

- World tour by Linkin Park
- Promotional poster for tour
- Location: North America; South America; Oceania; Europe; Asia
- Associated album: A Thousand Suns
- Start date: October 7, 2010
- End date: September 25, 2011
- Legs: 7
- No. of shows: 78

Linkin Park concert chronology
- International Tour (2009); A Thousand Suns World Tour (2010–2011); 2012 Honda Civic Tour (2012)

A Thousand Suns World Tour was the worldwide sixth concert tour by the American rock band Linkin Park. The tour supported the band's fourth studio album A Thousand Suns. The tour ranked 35th in Pollstar's "Top 50 Worldwide Tour (Mid-Year)", earning over 20 million dollars.

== Background ==
Linkin Park announced their upcoming world tour while doing press for their latest LP, A Thousand Suns. Vocalist Chester Bennington stated: "At this point we're writing such great music that I almost want to go do 50 shows around the world and then get right back into making another record. Once the ball starts rolling, it's all I want. It's like a drug."

During an interview with Streetdate Radio, Bennington expressed how odd it felt to begin the tour in South America, even though they are not well known in that region. He further stated that although Linkin Park sell more records in North America, they are more "well known" in other territories. As a band, it did not feel odd to begin in these territories first. During the same interview, he announced the band will play in North America beginning in January 2011.

== Opening acts ==
- Attaque 77 (Argentina)
- The Futureheads (Europe, select dates)
- Does It Offend You, Yeah? (England) (North America, select dates)
- DJ Bliss (United Arab Emirates)
- Quami & The Halvot (Israel)
- Dead Letter Circus (Sydney, Melbourne)
- Sleep Walker (Perth)
- CNBLUE (Chiba)
- The Art (Brisbane, Melbourne, Canberra)
- The Prodigy (North America, select dates)
- FYE (North America, select dates)
- Pendulum (North America, select dates)
- Circa Survive (Phoenix, Dallas)
- Paper Tongues (Phoenix, Dallas, Houston)

== Setlist ==
=== Europe & North America ===
1. "The Requiem"
2. "Wretches and Kings"
3. "Papercut"
4. "Given Up"
5. "New Divide"
6. "Faint"
7. "Empty Spaces"
8. "When They Come for Me"
9. "No More Sorrow"
10. "Jornada del Muerto"
11. "Waiting for the End"
12. "Wisdom, Justice, and Love"
13. "Iridescent"
14. "Numb"
15. "The Radiance" (contains excerpts from "The Catalyst")
16. "Breaking the Habit"
17. "Shadow of the Day"
18. "Crawling"
19. "One Step Closer"

Encore

20. "Fallout"
21. "The Catalyst"
22. "The Messenger"
23. "In the End" (contains elements of "One Step Closer")
24. "What I've Done"
25. "Bleed It Out"(contains elements of "Burning in the Skies" and "A Place for My Head")

=== Europe, Leg 2 ===
1. "The Requiem"
2. "Papercut"
3. "Lying from You"
4. "Given Up"
5. "What I've Done"
6. "Empty Spaces"
7. "When They Come for Me"
8. "No More Sorrow"
9. "Jornada del Muerto"
10. "Waiting for the End"
11. "Wisdom, Justice, and Love"
12. "Iridescent"
13. "Numb"
14. "The Radiance" (contains excerpts from "The Catalyst")
15. "Breaking the Habit"
16. "The Catalyst"
17. "Crawling"
18. "In the End"
19. "Bleed It Out" (contains elements of "Burning in the Skies" or "A Place for My Head")
20. "Faint"
21. "One Step Closer"

=== Australia ===
1. "The Requiem"
2. "Wretches and Kings"
3. "Lying from You"
4. "Papercut"
5. "Given Up"
6. "What I've Done"
7. "No More Sorrow"
8. "From the Inside"
9. "Jornada del Muerto"
10. "Waiting for the End"
11. "Blackout"
12. "Numb"
13. "The Radiance"
14. "Burning in the Skies"
15. "Fallout"
16. "The Catalyst"
17. "Shadow of the Day"
18. "In the End"
19. "Bleed It Out"

Encore

20. "Empty Spaces"
21. "When They Come for Me"
22. "Crawling"
23. "New Divide"
24. "Faint"
25. "One Step Closer"

=== Additional notes ===
- During concerts in South America, "Bleed It Out" was performed after "Crawling"
- During the concert at Yarkon Park in Tel Aviv, Israel, the band performed Bob Marley's "No Woman, No Cry".
- During the concert at The Roundhouse in London, England, the band covered Adele's "Rolling in the Deep". Later it was released as a Promotional single from the live EP iTunes Festival 2011.
- On October 25, while in Paris, the band decided to perform "A Place For My Head" (after "Crawling") to celebrate the release of their debut album Hybrid Theory, 10 years and a day ago.

== Tour dates ==
Date	City	Country	Venue
South America
October 7, 2010	Buenos Aires	Argentina	Estadio José Amalfitani
October 9, 2010^{[A]}	Santiago	Chile	Club Hípico de Santiago
October 11, 2010^{[B]}	Itu	Brazil	SWU Festival
Europe
October 20, 2010	Berlin	Germany	O_{2} World
October 22, 2010	Stuttgart	Germany	Hanns-Martin-Schleyer-Halle
October 23, 2010	Linz	Austria	Intersport Arena
October 25, 2010	Paris	France	Palais Omnisports de Paris-Bercy
October 26, 2010	Dortmund	Germany	Westfalenhallen
October 27, 2010	Cologne	Germany	Lanxess Arena
October 29, 2010	Hamburg	Germany	O_{2} World Hamburg
October 30, 2010	Herning	Denmark	Jyske Bank Boxen
November 1, 2010	Zürich	Switzerland	Hallenstadion
November 2, 2010	Frankfurt	Germany	Festhalle Frankfurt
November 4, 2010	Manchester	England	Manchester Evening News Arena
November 5, 2010	Newcastle	England	Metro Radio Arena
November 7, 2010	Madrid	Spain	Puerta de Alcalá
November 9, 2010	Birmingham	England	LG Arena
November 10, 2010	London	England	The O_{2} Arena
November 11, 2010	London	England	The O_{2} Arena
Asia
November 13, 2010^{[C]}	Abu Dhabi	United Arab Emirates	Du Arena
November 15, 2010	Tel Aviv	Israel	Hayarkon Park
Australia
December 3, 2010	Brisbane	Australia	Brisbane Entertainment Centre
December 4, 2010	Newcastle	Australia	Newcastle Entertainment Centre
December 7, 2010	Perth	Australia	Burswood Dome
December 9, 2010	Adelaide	Australia	Adelaide Entertainment Centre
December 11, 2010	Sydney	Australia	Acer Arena
December 12, 2010	Melbourne	Australia	Rod Laver Arena
December 13, 2010	Melbourne	Australia	Rod Laver Arena
December 15, 2010	Sydney	Australia	Acer Arena
December 16, 2010	Canberra	Australia	AIS Arena
North America
January 20, 2011	Sunrise	United States	BankAtlantic Center
January 22, 2011	Tampa	United States	St. Pete Times Forum
January 23, 2011	Atlanta	United States	Philips Arena
January 25, 2011	Detroit	United States	Joe Louis Arena
January 26, 2011	Chicago	United States	United Center
January 28, 2011	Saint Paul	United States	Xcel Energy Center
January 29, 2011	Kansas City	United States	Sprint Center
January 31, 2011	Philadelphia	United States	Wells Fargo Center
February 1, 2011	Boston	United States	TD Garden
February 4, 2011	New York City	United States	Madison Square Garden
February 7, 2011	Montreal	Canada	Centre Bell
February 8, 2011	Toronto	Canada	Air Canada Centre
February 19, 2011	Las Vegas	United States	MGM Grand Garden Arena
February 20, 2011	San Diego	United States	Viejas Arena
February 22, 2011	San Jose	United States	HP Pavilion at San Jose
February 23, 2011	Los Angeles	United States	Staples Center
February 25, 2011	Salt Lake City	United States	EnergySolutions Arena
February 26, 2011	Denver	United States	Pepsi Center
February 28, 2011	Phoenix	United States	US Airways Center
March 2, 2011	Dallas	United States	American Airlines Center
March 3, 2011	Houston	United States	Toyota Center
June 4, 2011^{[D]}	Irvine	United States	Verizon Wireless Amphitheatre
June 5, 2011^{[E]}	Mountain View	United States	Shoreline Amphitheatre
Europe
June 11, 2011^{[F]}	Nickelsdorf	Austria	Pannonia Fields II
June 12, 2011^{[G]}	Leicestershire	England	Donington Park
June 14, 2011	Stockholm	Sweden	Ericsson Globe
June 16, 2011	Helsinki	Finland	Kaisaniemi Park
June 18, 2011	Leipzig	Germany	Leipziger Festwiese
June 19, 2011^{[H]}	Oberursel	Germany	Hessentagsarena Open Air Gelände
June 21, 2011	Hamburg	Germany	O_{2} World
June 23, 2011^{[I]}	Moscow	Russia	Red Square
June 25, 2011	Munich	Germany	Olympia Reitstadion Riem
June 26, 2011^{[J]}	Imola	Italy	Autodromo Enzo e Dino Ferrari
June 28, 2011^{[K]}	Arendal	Norway	Tromøy
June 30, 2011^{[L]}	Rotselaar	Belgium	Werchter Festival Grounds
July 1, 2011^{[M]}	Arras	France	Citadelle d'Arras
July 2, 2011^{[N]}	St. Gallen	Switzerland	Sittertobel
July 4, 2011^{[O]}	London	England	Roundhouse
North America
August 30, 2011	Las Vegas	United States	The Joint
Asia
September 6, 2011	Chek Lap Kok	Hong Kong	AsiaWorld-Arena
September 8, 2011	Seoul	South Korea	Olympic Gymnastics Arena
September 11, 2011	Chiba	Japan	Makuhari Event Hall
September 13, 2011	Yokohama	Japan	Yokohama Arena
September 14, 2011	Nagoya	Japan	Nippon Gaishi Hall
September 16, 2011	Osaka	Japan	International Conference Hall
September 19, 2011	Taipei	Taiwan	TWTC Nangang Exhibition Hall
September 21, 2011	Jakarta	Indonesia	Gelora Bung Karno Stadium
September 23, 2011	Bangkok	Thailand	Aktive Square
September 25, 2011^{[P]}	Marina Bay	Singapore	Marina Bay Street Circuit

Festivals and other miscellaneous performances

^{A} This concert was a part of the Festival Maquinaria
^{B} This concert is a part of SWU Music + Arts Festival
^{C} This concert is a part of the Yasalam After-Race Concerts
^{D} This concert is a part of the KROQ Weenie Roast
^{E} This concert is a part of the Live 105's BFD

^{F} This concert is a part of the Nova Rock Festival
^{G} This concert is a part of the Download Festival
^{H} This concert is a part of the Hessentagl
^{I} This concert is in support of the world premiere of Transformers: Dark of the Moon.
^{J} This concert is a part of the Sonisphere Festival
^{K} This concert is a part of the Hove Festival

^{L} This concert is a part of Rock Werchter
^{M} This concert is a part of the Main Square Festival
^{N} This concert is a part of the OpenAir St. Gallen
^{O} This concert is a part of the iTunes Festival
^{P} This concert is a part of the Singapore Grand Prix

Cancellations and rescheduled shows

February 10, 2011	Washington, D.C.	Verizon Center	Cancelled
February 11, 2011	Uncasville	Mohegan Sun Arena	Cancelled
February 13, 2011	Cincinnati	U.S. Bank Arena	Cancelled
February 15, 2011	Houston	Toyota Center	Postponed and later rescheduled for March 3, 2011
February 17, 2011	Dallas	American Airlines Center	Postponed and later rescheduled for March 2, 2011
October 16, 2011	Pensacola Beach	Casino Beach	Cancelled. This concert was part of the DeLuna Fest.

=== Cancellations ===
Lead singer, Chester Bennington, fell ill cancelling three shows and rescheduling two from the North American leg of the tour. Originally, Bennington played a few shows not feeling well; doctors then advised him to stop playing, or the effects could have worsened.. Doctors tested Bennington for different illnesses, including H1N1. While in the process for testing for H1N1, complications arose, worsening his state. Eventually it emerged that he did not have the H1N1 virus, but a similar virus. However, Linkin Park were caused to cancel five shows due to this illness. Two of the five cancellations from the tour were able to be rescheduled, in Houston and Dallas. Uncasville and Cincinnati were later compensated during the 2012 Honda Civic Tour.

During Linkin Park's Asia tour, Bennington injured his shoulder and doctors advised him to undergo surgery, canceling the band's final show in Pensacola Beach, Florida for the tour and thus ending tour.

=== Box office score data ===
Venue	City	Tickets sold / available	Gross revenue
Palais Omnisports de Paris-Bercy	Paris	16,520 / 16,611 (99%)	$998,967
O_{2} World Hamburg	Hamburg	26,687 / 27,906 (96%)	$1,711,398
Manchester Evening News Arena	Manchester	12,810 / 12,810 (100%)	$833,605
The O_{2} Arena	London	29,803 / 32,320 (92%)	$1,944,680
Brisbane Entertainment Centre	Brisbane	8,743 / 9,747 (90%)	$1,075,620
Newcastle Entertainment Centre	Newcastle	1,467 / 5,426 (27%)	$156,605
Burswood Dome	Perth	6,066 / 16,480 (37%)	$644,325
Adelaide Entertainment Centre	Adelaide	4,479 / 7,478 (60%)	$463,064
Rod Laver Arena	Melbourne	13,196 / 20,000 (66%)	$1,371,080
AIS Arena	Canberra	2,671 / 3,971 (67%)	$222,331
BankAtlantic Center	Sunrise	10,150 / 10,150 (100%)	$550,558
St. Pete Times Forum	Tampa	10,807 / 10,807 (100%)	$522,897
United Center	Chicago	11,519 / 11,519 (100%)	$711,328
Xcel Energy Center	Saint Paul	10,001 / 10,001 (100%)	$592,629
Wells Fargo Center	Philadelphia	12,000 / 12,000 (100%)	$743,870
Madison Square Garden	New York City	15,170 / 15,170 (100%)	$812,120
Bell Centre	Montreal	12,677 / 12,677 (100%)	$838,557
Air Canada Centre	Toronto	12,836 / 12,836 (100%)	$872,177
MGM Grand Garden Arena	Las Vegas	12,975 / 12,975 (100%)	$738,193
HP Pavilion at San Jose	San Jose	13,456 / 13,456 (100%)	$733,791
Staples Center	Los Angeles	15,808 / 15,808 (100%)	$948,445
TOTAL		259,841 / 290,148 (89%)	$17,486,240

== Broadcasts and recordings ==
Throughout the tour, the band will provide an official bootleg recording of each concert after the performance. The band states this is a way to show their fans appreciation for the energy during each concert. Those who attended the show will be able to download the show for free while others can purchase the show on the band's official website. The concert at the Madison Square Garden in New York City was filmed and was broadcast on Fuse TV on February 18, 2011.

== Personnel ==
- Chester Bennington – vocals, rhythm guitar, percussion
- Rob Bourdon – drums
- Brad Delson – lead guitar, backing vocals, keyboards, percussion
- Dave "Phoenix" Farrell – bass, backing vocals, keyboards
- Joe Hahn – turntables, synthesizer, samples, backing vocals
- Mike Shinoda – vocals, rhythm guitar, lead guitar, keyboards, rapping
