= Blackout (Linkin Park song) =

Promotional single by Linkin Park

from the album A Thousand Suns
- Released: October 9, 2010
- Recorded: 2009–2010
- Genre: Industrial rock; rap rock; electronic rock; hard rock
- Length: 4:39
- Label: Warner Bros.; Machine Shop.
- Composer: Linkin Park
- Lyricists: Chester Bennington; Mike Shinoda
- Producers: Mike Shinoda; Rick Rubin

"Blackout" is a promotional single by American rock band Linkin Park. It is the ninth track from their 2010 album, A Thousand Suns. The song was written by the band and produced by co-lead vocalist Mike Shinoda and Rick Rubin.

Despite the lack of metal elements, the song does contain significant amounts of screaming (the choruses comprise solely of it), making for one of the more coarse-sounding songs on A Thousand Suns. It also features Chester Bennington rapping on most of the song and harmonizing with the verses that Mike Shinoda sings towards the end.

== Promotion ==
On August 18, 2010, Linkin Park posted a "Linkin Park TV" episode showing Chester Bennington doing freestyle vocals over the song. The remix by Renholdër was also used in Underworld: Awakening. A live version of the promotional single was used for the B-side of the single "Burning in the Skies" by the band in the same album.

The song was debuted for the live, alongside the single "Burning in the Skies", in Australia in late 2010. It featured sampled vocals from Bennington, for the bridge. The song was played in many concerts for the A Thousand Suns World Tour and in some concerts for the promotion of Living Things. The opening instrumental of the song was also performed as a segue into Papercut during The Hunting Party and the Carnivores Tour.

"Blackout" was a part of the "Linkin Park Track Pack" downloadable content for the video game Guitar Hero: Warriors of Rock. The song was also used in EA Sports's FIFA 11.

== Personnel ==
- Chester Bennington – lead vocals, percussion
- Mike Shinoda – keyboards, co-lead vocals, piano, sampler
- Brad Delson – guitar, percussion, synthesizers
- Phoenix – bass, keyboards, backing vocals
- Joe Hahn – turntables, sampler, backing vocals, programming
- Rob Bourdon – drums, percussion

== Charts ==
Chart (2010)	Peak position
UK Rock & Metal (OCC)	28

== Release history ==
Region	Date	Format	Label
Worldwide	September 8, 2010	Digital download	Warner Bros.; Machine Shop.
