= Iridescent (song) =

Single by Linkin Park

from the album A Thousand Suns and Transformers: Dark of the Moon – The Album
- B-side: "New Divide"; "What I've Done"
- Released: May 27, 2011
- Genre: Electronic rock; alternative rock
- Length: 4:06 (radio edit); 4:56 (album version)
- Label: Warner Bros.
- Composer: Linkin Park
- Lyricists: Chester Bennington; Mike Shinoda
- Producers: Rick Rubin; Mike Shinoda

Linkin Park singles chronology
"Burning in the Skies" (2011)	"Iridescent" (2011)	"Burn It Down" (2012)

Music video
- "Iridescent" on YouTube

"Iridescent" is a song by American rock band Linkin Park. It was announced as the band's third US, fourth international and overall final single from their fourth studio album, A Thousand Suns, which was released on September 14, 2010. A music video for the song was directed by Joe Hahn, the band's turntablist.

"Iridescent" serves as the theme song for the film Transformers: Dark of the Moon, continuing the streak of the band's songs serving as the theme songs of the Transformers films, and was remixed in Dolby Surround 7.1 for the movie's release.

The song received positive reviews and became a moderate success worldwide.

== Background ==
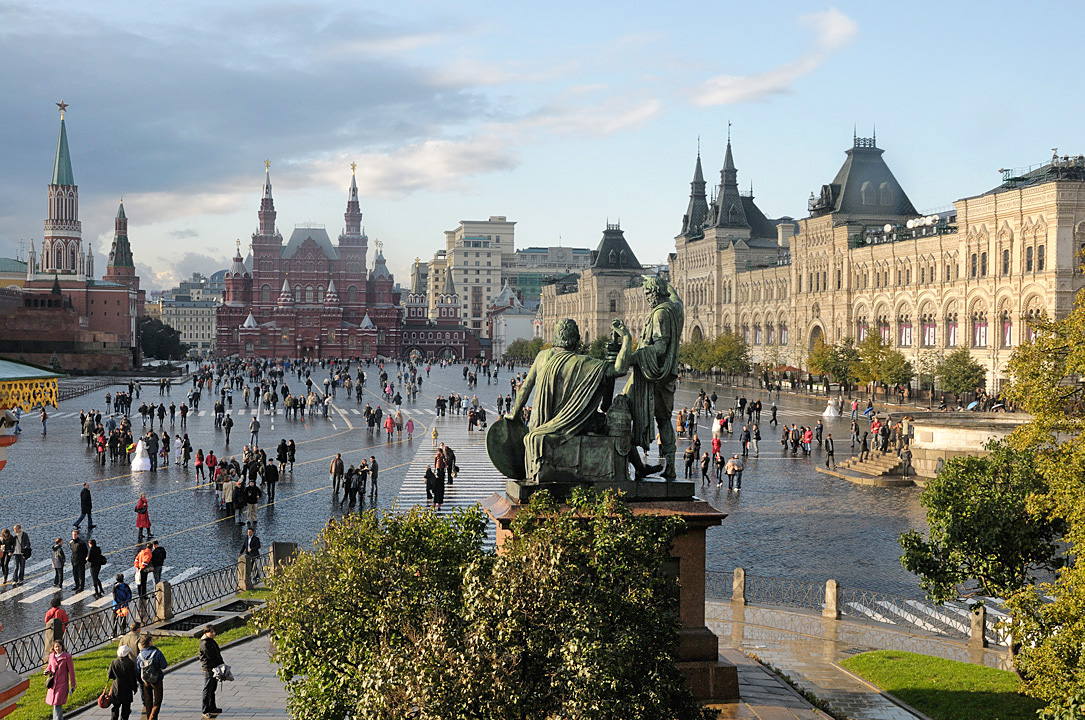
The single remix of "Iridescent" was performed live at Red Square (pictured) in Moscow.

In April 2011, a splash screen appeared on the band's website, that contained a distorted Autobot image and a snippet from "Iridescent" (this is no longer available). A few days later, Mike Shinoda, one of the band's lead vocalists, confirmed that the song will be the fourth single from A Thousand Suns. He also confirmed that a shorter version was made for the film Transformers: Dark of the Moon, which is circulating around the internet. Shinoda said that the collaboration began when Michael Bay, the director of the film series, phoned him about the possibility of the band continuing their run with songs paired with the Transformers films (having chosen "What I've Done" for the first film and having recorded "New Divide" specifically for the second). Shinoda decided to put "Iridescent" in the film due to the fact it was a fan favorite and called it a "natural fit", despite the song not being an "in-your-face" kind of tune.

The film's composer, Steve Jablonsky, who is a longtime fan of the band, agreed with the choice, saying that the song fit well with his score, as well as the film's story. Both Shinoda and Jablonsky agree that the song is an appropriate choice for the film, since the film is described to be more "positive" than the previous films and is consistent with where the band is at (learning from mistakes; going in different directions).

"Iridescent" is a rock ballad about hope in the midst of chaos and sadness. The album version of the song starts segued from the previous track "Wisdom, Justice and Love" as an A minor in piano with Mike Shinoda's verses as well, while the chorus are sung in C major and up until the end of the song where it segues to the next track "Fallout".

Hans Zimmer has collaborated with Steve Jablonsky and Linkin Park to incorporate the song into the film's score. It appears multiple times, primarily its synth and piano debut, modified to fit the tone of the scenes in which they are featured.

The first time it is played, Sam discovers Carly has been given a new car. The second time, it appears to be toned down to G minor with the piano as Sam Witwicky regroups with the Autobots. The third time it appears is when Sam gets couple counseling from his parents, though as an A minor. The fourth, when Sam and Epps infiltrate Chicago, was also in A minor with Shinoda's vocals. These appearances are marked by the merging of the song's theme as well as themes taken from this movie and the two previous ones' scores.

The final time it is played, it is introduced as the first verse's instrumental in A minor and then continues playing in its single edit as the credits roll however the chorus is cut shorter and then proceeds to the "Let it go" bridge.

The single edit is a minute shorter than the album version, this is due to the cutting of parts of the third verse and other parts of the songs. Some instruments' parts are removed or added for instance, drum beats are added at the beginning which were not present in the album version, the third chorus sung by all six members is cut and directly leads to the bridge "Let it go" and to the fourth final chorus with a part of the piano cut shorter.

Just like their previous single, "Burning in the Skies", Shinoda sings the verses while lead vocalist Chester Bennington sings the chorus and backup vocals on the verses. On the third chorus of the song, all six band members sing together.

Some LPTVs (behind-the-scenes footage) show the creation and development of "Iridescent", such as the inclusion of gang vocals in the third chorus of the song and the initial discussion about the song.

In June, Linkin Park held an artwork contest for "Iridescent", in which the winning artwork was shown in the band's stage in their concert at Red Square in Moscow at the premiere of Transformers: Dark of the Moon. Artworks were submitted to Linkin Park's official deviantArt. They announced the winner on June 23, 2011, however, aside from the aforementioned winner's artwork, they also showed the artwork of the contest's runner-up at the concert. The winner of the contest was Wan Muhammad Azzim from Melaka, Malaysia. The runner up was Ashkan Harati from Belgium while the other two finalists were Sanja Grbic from Serbia and Matthew Johnson from the United States.

HBO used the song to promote their 2011–12 Fall programming line up and the 2012 films that are featured on the HBO Go App.

== Music video ==
The official music video was directed by Joe Hahn, the band's turntablist and keyboardist. In an interview with MTV, Mike Shinoda stated: "All I know about the concept is that Joe Hahn sent me an e-mail that said something about 'In the valley of the blind, the one-eyed man is king', or something like that. And the next thing I know, I've got horns growing out of my shoulders, and I've got one blind eye, and I've got a white dog and a snake on a throne made of antlers. I think you'd have to ask Joe what that all means." The video's concept is based on the saying taken from the short story "The Country of the Blind" by H.G Wells.

In the behind-the-scenes video for "Iridescent", which was released on May 31, 2011, Hahn stated that he wanted to combine the "soulfulness" of Transformers: Dark of the Moon to the soulfulness of what they do, as well as elements of robots tying into human existence. In an extended behind-the-scenes video, which was released on July 11, 2011, it was revealed that Shinoda was required to carry a diamond carpet python.

The video is black and white with small slices of color elements mixed in giving it a sense of actual iridescence with emphasis on Transformers' characters' color. The video uses the radio edit of Iridescent, rather than the original on A Thousand Suns. In addition to the animated Transformers elements, the video has computer generated elements that call back to the videos for "Waiting for the End" and "Burning in the Skies".

The music video for "Iridescent" was released on June 3, 2011, on MTV and VH1. The video shows Mike Shinoda as a one-eyed king, with horns sticking out of his shoulders, ruling over the citizens of a post-apocalyptic land. Numerous citizens of the world are wearing ragged clothing, including the other band members. Some scenes also show the band sitting together in a feast, mirroring Leonardo da Vinci's painting "The Last Supper". Numerous scenes and stills from Transformers: Dark of the Moon are inserted to the video. Hahn stated that "the video explores how human existence might be affected by the elements of Transformers robots and the threat of the Decepticons."

On June 28, 2011, the band announced that the video can be seen in 3D in select theaters after the film credits of Transformers: Dark of the Moon. A day later, the same day the film was released in US and Canada, the 3D video was released online; however, the video has since been made private by the band.

The video peaked at VH1 India's Top 50 videos of 2011 at number 5.

== Track listing ==
All tracks are written by Linkin Park.

Europe CD single and digital download
No.	Title	Length
1.	"Iridescent" (from Transformers: Dark of the Moon)	4:01
2.	"New Divide"	4:30
3.	"What I've Done"	3:25

iTunes single
No.	Title	Length
1.	"Iridescent" (from Transformers: Dark of the Moon)	3:59

== Personnel ==
- Chester Bennington – co-lead vocals, rhythm guitar
- Mike Shinoda – lead vocals, sampler, keyboards, piano
- Brad Delson – lead guitar, backing vocals
- Dave "Phoenix" Farrell – bass, backing vocals
- Joe Hahn – turntables, samplers, backing vocals
- Rob Bourdon – drums, percussion, backing vocals

Production

Based on AllMusic

- Mike Shinoda - production
- Rick Rubin - production
- Neal Avron - mixing
- Brian "Big Bass" Gardner - mastering

== Commercial performance ==
"Iridescent" has achieved moderate success. The single debuted at #86 on the US Billboard Hot 100 and later peaked at #81, spending three weeks on the chart. The single also charted to the US Billboard Alternative Songs at #21 before being officially released. The single debuted at the UK Singles Chart at #93, but debuted high at the UK Rock Chart at #2.

== Charts ==
Chart performance for "Iridescent"
Chart (2011)	Peak position
Australia (ARIA)	39
Austria (Ö3 Austria Top 40)	52
Germany (GfK)	46
Germany Airplay (GfK)	74
Israel (Media Forest)	10
Lebanon (The Official Lebanese Top 20)	2
Mexico Ingles Airplay (Billboard)	44
Scottish Singles Sales (Official Charts)	85
South Korea (International Chart) (GAON)	2
Switzerland (Schweizer Hitparade)	69
UK Singles (Official Charts)	93
UK Rock & Metal (Official Charts)	2
US Billboard Hot 100	81
US Hot Rock & Alternative Songs (Billboard)	29

== Certifications ==
Certifications for "Iridescent"
Region	Certification	Certified units/sales
United States (RIAA)	Gold	500,000^{‡}
^{‡} Sales+streaming figures based on certification alone.

== Release history ==
Release dates and formats for "Iridescent"
Region	Date	Format	Label(s)	Ref.
United States	June 14, 2011	Mainstream airplay	Warner Bros.	
