= New Divide =

Single by Linkin Park

from the album Transformers: Revenge of the Fallen – The Album
- B-side: "New Divide" (instrumental); "New Divide" (a cappella)
- Released: May 18, 2009
- Recorded: 2009
- Genre: Alternative rock; electronic rock
- Length: 4:28
- Label: Reprise; Warner Bros.
- Songwriter: Linkin Park
- Producer: Mike Shinoda

Linkin Park singles chronology
"Leave Out All the Rest" (2008)	"New Divide" (2009)	"Not Alone" (2010)

Audio sample
- file; help

Music video
- "New Divide" on YouTube

"New Divide" is a song by American rock band Linkin Park. The song was released as a standalone single, and was also recorded specifically for the soundtrack to Michael Bay's film Transformers: Revenge of the Fallen. It was written by the band and produced by band member Mike Shinoda. It also serves as the film's main theme and was released as the soundtrack's lead single on May 18, 2009, by Reprise Records.

"New Divide" was widely acclaimed by professional critics and remains one of the most popular songs in Linkin Park's discography. It is one of the few songs to top the US Rock Songs, Alternative Songs, and Hot Mainstream Rock Tracks at the same time. It is one of the band's highest-charting songs, peaking at number 6 on the US Billboard Hot 100. Its working title was "Megatron".

== Background ==
Linkin Park's "What I've Done" is on the first Transformers soundtrack and was played in the trailer for a short second. Mike Shinoda first alluded to "New Divide" on March 28, 2009, stating, "We've been working on a new song in the past couple of weeks that has been a lot of fun. The backdrop for the song is built on layered, heavy synths and a sharp performance by [the band's drummer,] Rob Bourdon." On April 24, Shinoda revealed that they were working with film score composer Hans Zimmer, writing various interpretations of "New Divide" to serve as thematic elements for the film. When discussing the Transformers sequel with Blabbermouth, Michael Bay said, "I love Linkin Park... they really delivered with 'New Divide' — it's a great song that perfectly matches the film's intensity." Parts of the intro were used in the final Transformers trailer.

The cue "NEST" from Steve Jablonsky's Revenge of the Fallen musical score features instrumental excerpts from "New Divide". Linkin Park worked with award-winning composer Hans Zimmer to rework "New Divide" into the musical score. As a result, the song was featured prominently in the film, with instrumental clips of it played several times throughout, in addition to the song being played during the end credits. The song was later adopted as the theme/opening song for the NHL's San Jose Sharks. The song also plays as the background music for the Medal of Honor E3 multiplayer trailer.

A live version of the song is included as a B-side to "The Catalyst" and a bonus track for the Japanese release of A Thousand Suns. The studio version of the song is also included as the B-side to "Iridescent".

On September 4, 2012, "New Divide", along with "Breaking the Habit", "Shadow of the Day", and "Burn It Down", were released in the "Linkin Park Pack 02" as downloadable content for the music rhythm video game Rock Band 3.

The instrumental version of this song was also featured on the Weather Channel's Local on the 8's playlist in January and February 2012.

In 2024, "New Divide" was included on the compilation album Papercuts (Singles Collection 2000–2023).

== Composition ==
The song is composed in the key of F minor in 4/4 time. The song employs a verse-chorus-verse format, with the second chorus being cut short by a mechanically-themed breakdown meant to emulate the iconic "transforming" sound effect from the Transformers franchise.

== Critical reception ==
"New Divide" received critical acclaim upon its release. Fans lauded it for its aptitude and appeal as the movie's soundtrack. Much of the song's criticism from reviewers is that of the structure, claiming it is too similar to past Linkin Park singles, as well as sounding very similar to "What I've Done" which was used in Transformers. Videos posted on YouTube show similarities in structure between the two songs. One of the reviews was from Chris Williams of Billboard Magazine, who wrote:

" 'New Divide' fits the sci-fi genre: spacious, moody and futuristic. Lead vocalist Chester Bennington gives one of his more straightforward vocal performances, deftly balancing his usual rock edge with a more melody-focused pop vocal. It's a welcome return that should satisfy the band's fan base and bring in some new fans as well."

The song received a first-round nomination for Best Original Song for the 82nd Academy Awards but failed to make it to the final list.

== Music video ==
On May 14, Shinoda revealed that they were currently recording an accompanying music video for the song. The video, shot on location at Paramount Studios (which distributed the Transformers films) May 13 and 14, is set in the Egyptian cave where the bodies of the Dynasty of the Primes and the Autobot Matrix of Leadership are hidden, and was directed by Joe Hahn, the band's DJ. When discussing the video, Shinoda stated "[Joe Hahn's] planning on using a lot of really interesting cutting-edge visual techniques, blurring the line between our performance and some kind of digital/mechanical reality." Chester Bennington confirmed that the video is related to the Transformers: Revenge of the Fallen movie, saying on his blog, "Honestly, I don't know what's going on in the video. We're in a tomb rocking out and there's a huge dead Transformer." Linkin Park has released two behind the scenes videos of the music video. Both photos and footage of the video shoot were posted on Shinoda's blog site. The video premiered on the band's Myspace site on June 11. There are two versions, the Transformer version or the alternate version which consists only of the band playing.

The music video features scenes taken from the movie, and a lot of special effects are also seen and the video was heavily edited in places making use of thermal cameras and using flying food parts as texture around a lot of the thermal imagery. Despite many rumors of the woman in the video being Megan Fox and even vocalist Chester Bennington's wife Talinda, she is a different actress hired to portray Mikaela Banes. According to Talinda, she is only shown in the thermal lens to look more like Fox. Bassist Dave Farrell is not seen in shots of the whole band performing as he injured his wrist during the first day of filming. It is presumed this is the reason for his lack of appearance in the video. However, he is seen many times during the special effects.

The video was packaged into the two-disc special edition DVD and Blu-ray of Transformers: Revenge of the Fallen.

== Live performances ==
Linkin Park debuted "New Divide" for the US premiere for Revenge of the Fallen outside Mann's Theatre Village, Westwood, California, on June 22, 2009. Afterwards, the song became a staple in Linkin Park setlists.

During the 2009 International Tour and the majority of the A Thousand Suns World Tour, "New Divide" bears an extended synth intro. It also opened two shows transitioning out of A Thousand Suns's "The Requiem" and "The Radiance", and opened the band's show on its own for the premiere of Transformers: Dark of the Moon in Moscow, Russia, and the final show of the tour at the 2011 Singapore Grand Prix, bearing an all-new intro nicknamed the "Moscow Intro".

During the Living Things World Tour, the song didn't have much movement. For the majority of touring cycle of The Hunting Party, the song was abridged, with the first chorus and second verse removed, with the song restored to studio form in The Hunting Party Tour's North American Summer Tour. The One More Light World Tour also did not see much movement for the song.

At the Linkin Park and Friends: Celebrate Life in Honor of Chester Bennington tribute show at the Hollywood Bowl, Linkin Park played the 2014 abridged version of "New Divide" as the second song of the encore, after a short reprise of "Iridescent". The band played the song instrumentally to pre-recorded vocals of the late Chester Bennington, taken from the band's show at the Hollywood Bowl in 2014 as part of the Carnivores Tour.

== Commercial performance ==
In the United States, "New Divide" debuted at number six on the Billboard Hot 100, the band's highest debut to date, and their highest-peaking song since "In the End" on the chart. The single dropped sharply to number 39 the week after its release but resurfaced within the top 10 at number nine following the film's worldwide premiere. "New Divide" reached number one on both the Alternative Songs chart and the Mainstream Rock Tracks chart, and remained at the peak spot on the former chart for twelve weeks, making it their third longest-running number one there (the first and second being “What I’ve Done” and "Numb" respectively). It is the band's eighth number one on the Alternative Songs chart. The single was certified platinum by the RIAA in August 2009, and in December 2010 it topped the 2 million mark in paid downloads. As of June 2014, the song has sold 2,634,000 copies in the US. The song is the band's third and last top-10 hit in the US.

"New Divide" has also been successful worldwide. It debuted at number three on the Canadian Hot 100 and reached the top ten on the Australian ARIA Charts, debuting at number ten. "New Divide" has since become Linkin Park's highest-charting song in Australia, peaking at #3 on the Aria Top 50 Singles Chart. It reached platinum in Australia after 15 weeks on the chart selling over 70,000 sales. It left the chart after 21 weeks making it the 587th best ever song on the ARIA chart. It has also reached #2 on the New Zealand RIANZ chart and was certified gold after 12 weeks, selling over 7,500 copies. The song went platinum in New Zealand and then left the chart after 20 weeks. The song peaked at number 19 on the UK Singles Chart, and number 1 on the UK Rock Chart. In Germany, it reached #4, tying it as their highest-peaking song there. In Finland, it is the band's second highest-peaking song after "What I've Done", reaching #3. It also reached the top twenty in Italy, Turkey, Sweden, and Switzerland.

== Track listing ==
All tracks are written by Linkin Park.

CD
No.	Title	Length
1.	"New Divide"	4:28
2.	"New Divide" (Instrumental)	4:29
3.	"New Divide" (A Cappella)	3:56

iTunes EP
No.	Title	Length
1.	"New Divide"	4:28
2.	"New Divide" (Instrumental)	4:29
3.	"New Divide" (A Cappella)	3:55
4.	"New Divide" (Live)	4:54

New Divide (Live) single
No.	Title	Length
1.	"New Divide" (Live) (Video)	4:54

== Personnel ==
- Chester Bennington – lead vocals
- Rob Bourdon – drums
- Brad Delson – guitar
- Dave Farrell – bass guitar
- Joe Hahn – samples, programming
- Mike Shinoda – keyboards, backing vocals, synthesizers

== Charts ==
=== Weekly charts ===
2009 weekly chart performance for "New Divide"
Chart (2009)	Peak position
Australia (ARIA)	3
Austria (Ö3 Austria Top 40)	2
Belgium (Ultratip Flanders)	1
Belgium (Ultratop 50 Wallonia)	32
Canada Hot 100 (Billboard)	3
Canada CHR/Top 40 (Billboard)	42
Canada Rock (Billboard)	1
CIS Airplay (TopHit)	47
Czech Republic Airplay (ČNS IFPI)	11
European Hot 100 (Billboard)	15
Finland (Suomen virallinen lista)	3
Germany (GfK)	4
Ireland (IRMA)	21
Italy (FIMI)	19
Mexico Ingles Airplay (Billboard)	40
Netherlands (Dutch Top 40)	23
Netherlands (Single Top 100)	68
New Zealand (Recorded Music NZ)	2
Russia Airplay (TopHit)	48
Slovakia Airplay (ČNS IFPI)	13
Sweden (Sverigetopplistan)	13
Switzerland (Schweizer Hitparade)	7
UK Singles (Official Charts)	19
UK Rock & Metal (Official Charts)	1
US Billboard Hot 100	6
US Adult Pop Airplay (Billboard)	21
US Hot Rock & Alternative Songs (Billboard)	1
US Pop Airplay (Billboard)	26

2017 weekly chart performance for "New Divide"
Chart (2017)	Peak position
Scottish Singles Sales (Official Charts)	68
UK Rock & Metal (Official Charts)	17

=== Year-end charts ===
Year-end chart performance for "New Divide"
Chart (2009)	Position
Australia (ARIA)	29
Austria (Ö3 Austria Top 40)	17
Canada (Canadian Hot 100)	51
CIS (TopHit)	123
Germany (Official German Charts)	33
New Zealand (Recorded Music NZ)	23
Russia Airplay (TopHit)	120
Switzerland (Schweizer Hitparade)	33
Taiwan (Yearly Singles Top 100)	16
UK Singles (OCC)	145
US Billboard Hot 100	61
US Hot Rock Songs (Billboard)	3

== Certifications ==
Certifications and sales for "New Divide"
Region	Certification	Certified units/sales
Australia (ARIA)	Platinum	70,000^{^}
Denmark (IFPI Danmark)	Gold	45,000^{‡}
Germany (BVMI)	3× Gold	450,000^{‡}
Italy (FIMI)	Gold	35,000^{‡}
Japan (RIAJ)	Platinum	250,000^{*}
New Zealand (RMNZ)	2× Platinum	60,000^{‡}
United Kingdom (BPI)	Platinum	600,000^{‡}
United States (RIAA)	3× Platinum	3,000,000^{‡}
^{*} Sales figures based on certification alone.^{^} Shipments figures based on certification alone.^{‡} Sales+streaming figures based on certification alone.

== Release history ==
Release dates and formats for "New Divide"
Region	Date	Format	Label(s)	Ref.
United States	June 8, 2009	Mainstream airplay	Warner Bros.	
