= A Thousand Suns =

Studio album by Linkin Park
- Released: September 8, 2010
- Recorded: November 2008 – June 2010
- Studio: NRG Recording (North Hollywood, California)
- Genres: Electronic rock; experimental rock; industrial rock; art rock; progressive rock
- Length: 47:48
- Labels: Warner Bros.; Machine Shop
- Producers: Rick Rubin; Mike Shinoda

Linkin Park chronology
A Decade Underground (2010)	A Thousand Suns (2010)	Hybrid Theory – Live Around the World (2012)

Singles from A Thousand Suns
- 1. "The Catalyst" Released: August 2, 2010; 2. "Waiting for the End" Released: October 1, 2010; 3. "Burning in the Skies" Released: March 21, 2011; 4. "Iridescent" Released: May 28, 2011

A Thousand Suns is the fourth studio album by American rock band Linkin Park. It was first released in multiple nations on September 8, 2010, and in the United States on September 14, 2010, by Warner Bros. Records. The album was produced by Mike Shinoda and Rick Rubin, who had also worked together to produce the band's previous studio album Minutes to Midnight (2007). Recording sessions for A Thousand Suns took place at NRG Recording Studios in Hollywood, California from 2008 until mid 2010.

A Thousand Suns is a concept album dealing with human fears such as nuclear warfare. The band has said the album is a drastic departure from their previous work; they experimented on different and new sounds. Chester Bennington told MTV the album references numerous social issues and blends human ideas with technology. The title is a reference to the Bhagavad Gita, a line from which was popularized in 1945 by J. Robert Oppenheimer, who described the atomic bomb as being "as bright as a thousand suns". It also appears in a line from the first single of the album, "The Catalyst". A Thousand Suns is Linkin Park's longest studio album to date, clocking in at 47 minutes and 48 seconds.

"The Catalyst" was sent to radio and released to digital music retailers on August 2, 2010. "The Catalyst" peaked at No. 1 on the Billboard Alternative Songs and Rock Songs charts. Three more singles were released to promote the album: "Waiting for the End", "Burning in the Skies" and "Iridescent". "The Catalyst" and "Waiting for the End" were certified gold by the Recording Industry Association of America (RIAA). Linkin Park promoted the album through the A Thousand Suns World Tour from October 2010 to September 2011.

The album was generally received positively by critics, some of whom found it to be a natural progression for the band, but polarized fans. The record debuted at number one on over ten charts, and was certified platinum by the RIAA in August 2017.

== Writing and recording ==
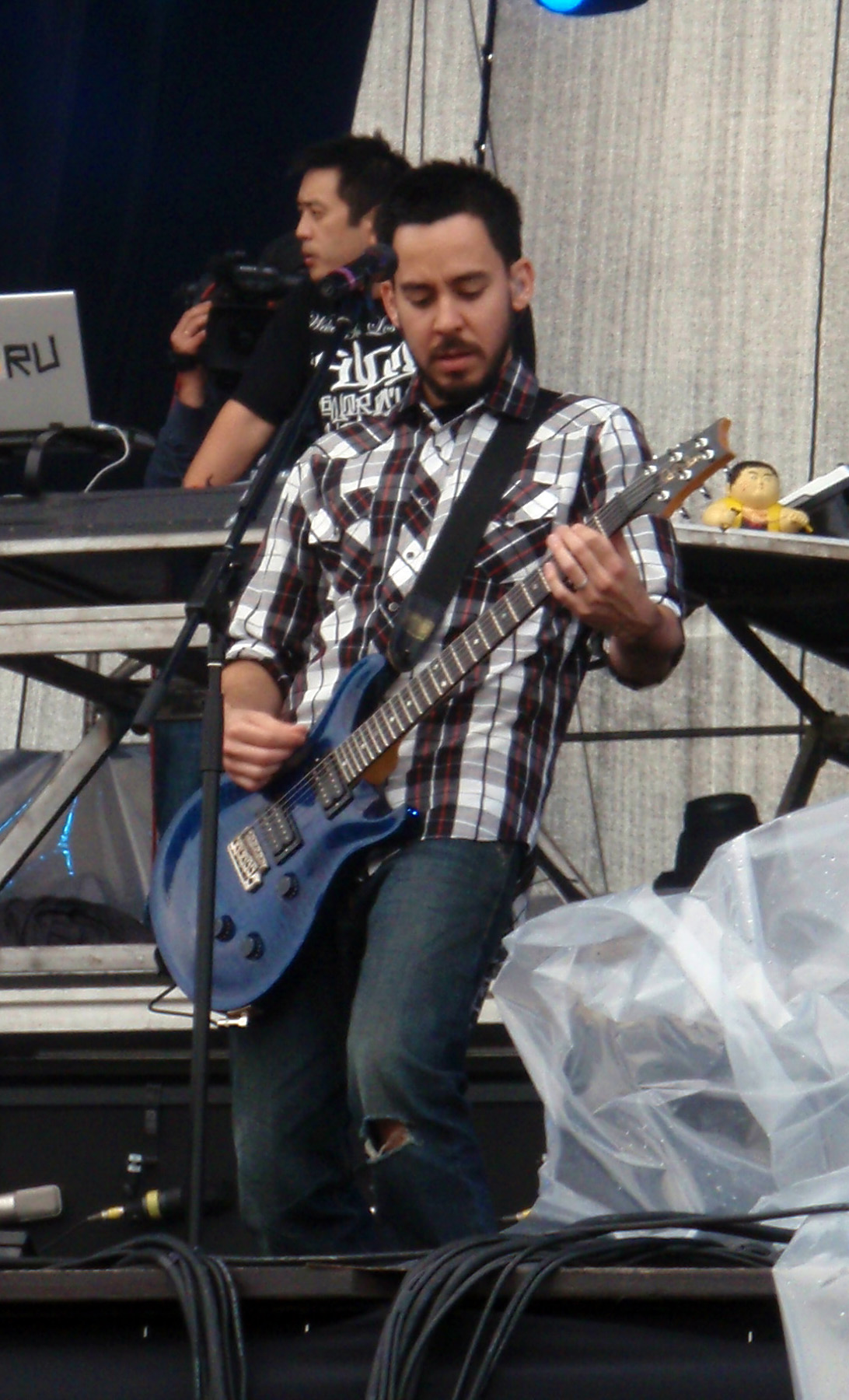
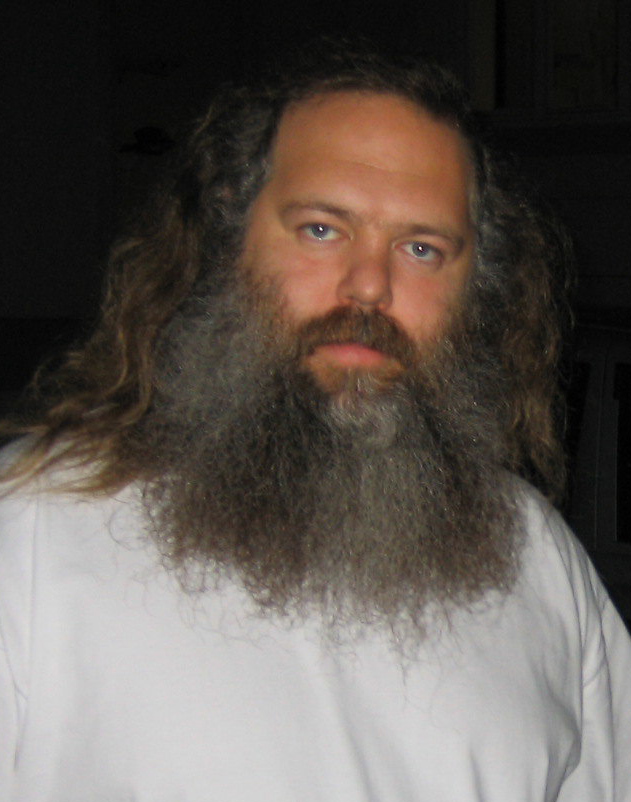
Linkin Park co-vocalist Mike Shinoda (left) and Rick Rubin (right) served as producers for A Thousand Suns.

Recording for the album began in 2008, over a year after the release of Minutes to Midnight (2007). As with Minutes to Midnight, Shinoda and Rick Rubin produced the album. Primary recording sessions for A Thousand Suns took place at NRG Recording Studios in North Hollywood, Los Angeles, California. In November 2008, lead singer Chester Bennington said the new record was a concept album; he said it "sound[ed] a little daunting to me, so, I think my confidence level will drop, but when it was presented to us by this friend of ours, we liked the idea. It was an inspiring idea, and it was something we could relate a lot of the things we like to write about to."

In May 2009, Mike Shinoda revealed info on the album in a Billboard magazine story, saying: "I feel like we've been writing a lot. I'd say we've got about half the music done, though I shouldn't say halfway because who knows how long the next batch of songs will take. But all the material's just kind of coming together, and every week we meet up and assess the situation and for the rest of the week we just go and work on whatever we find exciting." He also explained the experimentation that the band would be working with, saying, "It's not going to be Hybrid Theory. It's not going to be Minutes to Midnight. And if we do it right, it'll have a cutting edge sound that defines itself as an individual record separate from anything else that's out there."

Chester Bennington continued composing for the album while touring with Dead by Sunrise in support of their 2009 studio album Out of Ashes. He said Linkin Park was still making a concept record, stating in another interview with MTV, "we might need to just make a record and still try to do a concept but figure out a way to do it without actually waiting another five or six years to put out a record, to try to pull off all the grandiose insanity we were thinking of doing. And we're doing that." Bassist Dave "Phoenix" Farrell predicted the band's fans would be divided about A Thousand Suns, saying, "We've known [the album is] going to be different, and if fans were expecting Hybrid Theory or Meteora, they're going to be surprised. It's going to take people some time to figure it out and know what to do with it."

When asked about the new project, drummer Rob Bourdon said, "We tend to be perfectionists and it's sort of how we work. We like being in the studio and when we get in there we write a ton of material." Bourdon said the album was a challenge to complete; he said, "We've been making music for a long time so one of the challenges was to evolve and make something to keep us interested and also have a lot of fun in the process. We've been used to making a certain type of music and using sounds to accomplish that. So to break out of that and push ourselves to grow is definitely challenging." Shinoda later said the album was not a concept record, saying, "People asked us if it's a concept record, and in the middle of the process, we were contemplating whether or not that was what we wanted to do," although he said that eventually, A Thousand Suns at its completion has no narrative and is "more abstract" than many concept albums.

== Style and composition ==
In an interview with Rolling Stone in May 2009, Mike Shinoda said the band was in the process of writing and recording material for the album. The album was originally scheduled for an early 2010 release. However, Shinoda was concerned with "the quality of the tunes" and said, "if we need to take a step back and make sure everything is top, top quality by our standards, we will". He also said that, in comparison to Minutes to Midnight, the new album would have a bigger "thread of consistency" and would be more experimental and "hopefully more cutting-edge".

Christopher Weingarten of The Village Voice compared the album to Radiohead's third studio album, OK Computer, describing the record's composition as "uninhibited hooks, daffy left turns, piano-soaked bathos, explorations of the human relationship with technology, [and] a complete avoidance of metal". Weingarten noted various elements and styles the band incorporated in A Thousand Suns, saying the band was "sink[ing] their distortion pedals into a tender oblivion, embracing the pulseless Vocoder syrup of Imogen Heap, the cuddly heavenward synths of Yeasayer, the post-apocalyptic stutter-hop of El-P, the head rush of Ibiza house". Jordy Kasko of Review Rinse Repeat compared the style of A Thousand Suns to that of Pink Floyd's eighth studio album The Dark Side of the Moon and Radiohead's fourth studio album Kid A.

James Montgomery of MTV compared the album to Kid A because of the lack of guitars, the style being completely different from the band's previous works, and the album's message. Montgomery said, "None of these problems, these terrors or these specters that haunt us in 2010 are particularly new. Quite the opposite, in fact. We've just chosen to ignore the warnings. And now it might be too late." According to turntablist Joe Hahn, the album's title is a reference to a line in the Hindu Sanskrit scripture the Bhagavad Gita "If the radiance of a thousand suns were to burst at once into the sky, that would be like the splendor of the mighty one," which was made famous by J. Robert Oppenheimer in reference to the atomic bomb. The title also appears in the album's lead single "The Catalyst", which appears in the line "God save us everyone, will we burn inside the fires of a thousand suns?". The band said Oppenheimer's comments about the nuclear bomb influenced the apocalyptic themes of the album. The band wrote about these comments in the album's liner notes:

Oppenheimer's words resonate today not only for their historical significance, but for their emotional gravity. So, too, A Thousand Suns grapples with the personal cycle of pride, destruction, and regret. In life, like in dreams, this sequence is not always linear. And, sometimes, true remorse penetrates the devastating cycle. The hope, of course, springs from the notion that the possibility of change is born in our most harrowing moments.

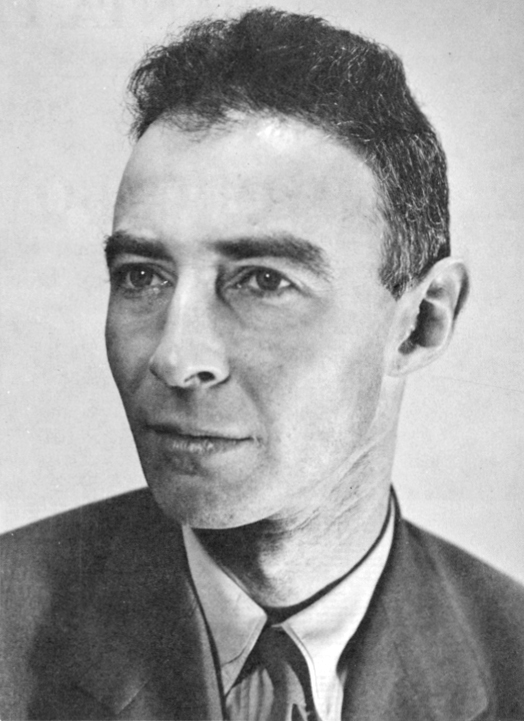
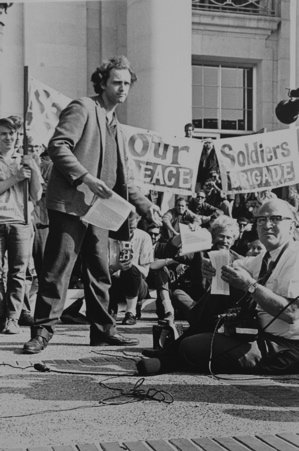
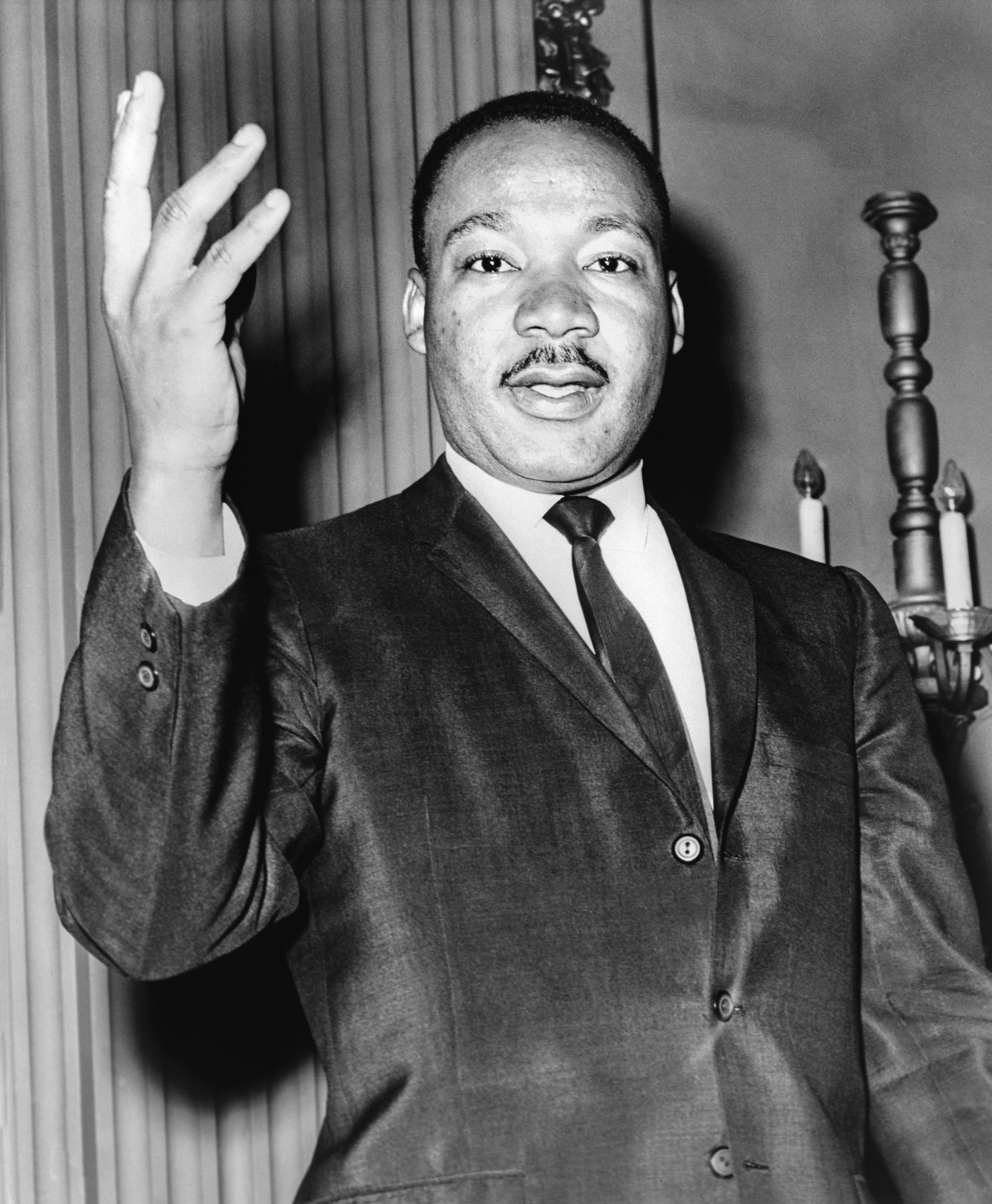
Samples of notable speeches of J. Robert Oppenheimer (left), Mario Savio (center) and Martin Luther King Jr. (right) were used in A Thousand Suns.

The band has stated that the album's tenth track, "Wretches and Kings", pays homage to the hip-hop group Public Enemy. Speaking to NME about the song's reference to Public Enemy, Shinoda said, "There is a homage to Chuck D on there. It's probably the most hip-hop song on the record and one of the most aggressive ... Public Enemy were very three-dimensional with their records because although they seemed political, there was a whole lot of other stuff going on in there too. It made me think how three-dimensional I wanted our record to be without imitating them of course, and show where we were at creatively." Ian Winwood of Kerrang! noted that "Wretches and Kings" references the Public Enemy song "Fight the Power" and compared the album's content to Public Enemy's third studio album, Fear of a Black Planet. Chuck D later provided vocals on a remix by HavocNdeeD. The fifth track "When They Come for Me" references The Blueprint^{2}: The Gift & The Curse, the seventh studio album by hip hop artist Jay-Z, with whom the band collaborated on the 2004 EP Collision Course. The album includes samples of notable speeches by American political figures, including Martin Luther King Jr., J. Robert Oppenheimer, and Mario Savio.

Chester Bennington stated in an interview with MTV News, which referred to Linkin Park's new style as being less technical and more organic:

"When it came to doing things that felt very much like older Linkin Park, like mixing hip-hop with a rock chorus, [we] felt like, if we were going to do it, we need to really do it in a way that felt natural and felt original and felt like it was something we hadn't done in the past ... [While] there are hip-hop songs on the album—'Wretches and Kings', 'When They Come for Me'—they're like nothing the band have tried before: snarling, raw, dark and ... strangely organic."

Critics and reporters labeled A Thousand Suns as electronic rock, art rock, industrial rock, experimental rock, and progressive rock. They also noticed various traces of trip hop, ambient, alternative rock, industrial, and rap rock across the album. Compared to their previous record, Minutes to Midnight (2007), Shinoda contributed many more vocals, while Brad Delson's guitar riffs are put further into the background, which Gary Graff of Billboard described as "on the back burner (and barely even in the oven)". Shinoda raps on the tracks "When They Come for Me", "Wretches and Kings" and the album's second single "Waiting for the End". Derek Oswald of AltWire.net noted reggae-like influences on Shinoda's verses in "Waiting for the End". He sings verses on "Burning in the Skies", "Robot Boy", "Blackout", "Iridescent" and "The Catalyst". Bennington and Shinoda sing together on "The Catalyst", "Jornada del Muerto" and "Robot Boy", while "Iridescent" features all band members singing together.

== Release and promotion ==
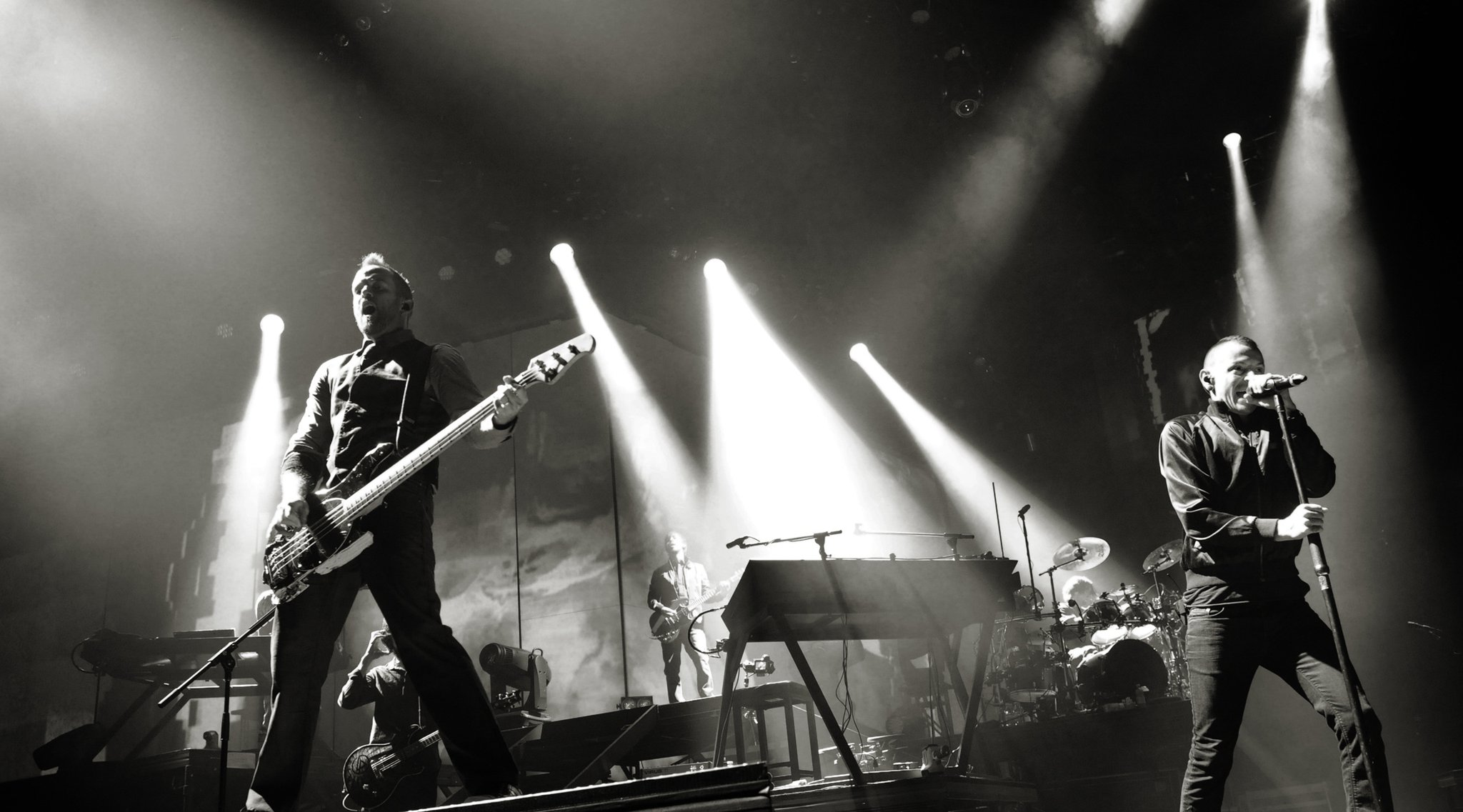
Linkin Park performing in Berlin, Germany to promote A Thousand Suns on October 20, 2010

The album was exhibited at a 3-D laser exhibition at Music Box Theater in Hollywood on September 7, 2010. A Thousand Suns was officially released on September 10, 2010, in Germany, Austria and Switzerland; and on September 13, 2010, in the US. Linkin Park started worldwide promotion of the album with the A Thousand Suns World Tour, which started on October 7, 2010, in Buenos Aires, Argentina and ended on September 25, 2011, in Singapore. The band performed an entire setlist in the Puerta de Alcalá Gate in Madrid; their live performance of "Waiting for the End" was shown at the 2010 MTV Europe Music Awards.

The album was released on CD in September 8, 2010 in select countries, September 10, 2010 in Europe, and September 14, 2010 in the United States.

Linkin Park promoted A Thousand Suns by featuring songs from the album in video games. Joe Hahn said "The Catalyst" would be included in the video game Medal of Honor. Hahn also announced he would direct a trailer for the game; it was released on August 1, 2010— one day before the single's release. Dave "Phoenix" Farrell stated that the band's members believed the song's "dark undertones ... fits with the subject matter" of the game, which was the reason "The Catalyst" was chosen for Medal of Honor.

During the Japanese release of the album on September 15, 2010, Warner Music Japan announced that "The Catalyst" would be the official theme song of Mobile Suit Gundam: Extreme Vs.. In addition, Warner Music Japan released a limited edition package bundle for the album, containing the CD, along with a 1/144 scale plastic model kit of the RX-78GP01Fb Gundam "Zephyranthes" Full Burnern from the anime OVA series Mobile Suit Gundam 0083: Stardust Memory, molded in colors and using color-correcting stickers evoking the imagery used on the cover of the album. It was further accompanied by artwork of the members of Linkin Park in Earth Federation military uniforms and pilot suits alongside the custom colored GP01Fb.

"Blackout" was featured in the soccer video game by EA Sports, FIFA 11. The band released a video game called Linkin Park Revenge—an edition of Tap Tap Revenge that features four tracks from the album and six songs from previous Linkin Park albums. "Wretches and Kings" is featured in the trailer for the video game EA Sports MMA.

"Blackout", "Burning in the Skies", "The Catalyst", "The Messenger", "Waiting for the End", and "Wretches and Kings" were available as downloadable content in the "Linkin Park Track Pack" for the rhythm video game Guitar Hero: Warriors of Rock, which was released on October 19, 2010, on the PlayStation Store, Xbox Live Marketplace, and Wii Shop Channel. Customers who purchased Guitar Hero: Warriors of Rock from Amazon.com between October 17 and October 23 received a copy of A Thousand Suns. Three songs were remixed and released as downloadable content for the rhythm video game DJ Hero 2 in late 2010. On January 11, 2011, a Linkin Park track pack was released for the rhythm video game Rock Band 3; it includes "Waiting for the End" and five songs from the band's previous albums.

On March 5, 2011, Mike Shinoda announced the European release of A Thousand Suns +, a limited re-issue of the album that was released on March 28, 2011. The re-release includes a live DVD of the band's MTV Europe Music Awards concert at Puerta de Alcalá, Madrid on November 7, 2010, and an MP3 audio file of the show. On June 19, 2012, a live version of the album, titled A Thousand Suns: Live Around the World was released on Spotify. It features ten of the album's fifteen songs. The tracks were recorded in London, Hamburg, Paris, Berlin, and Las Vegas.

=== Singles ===
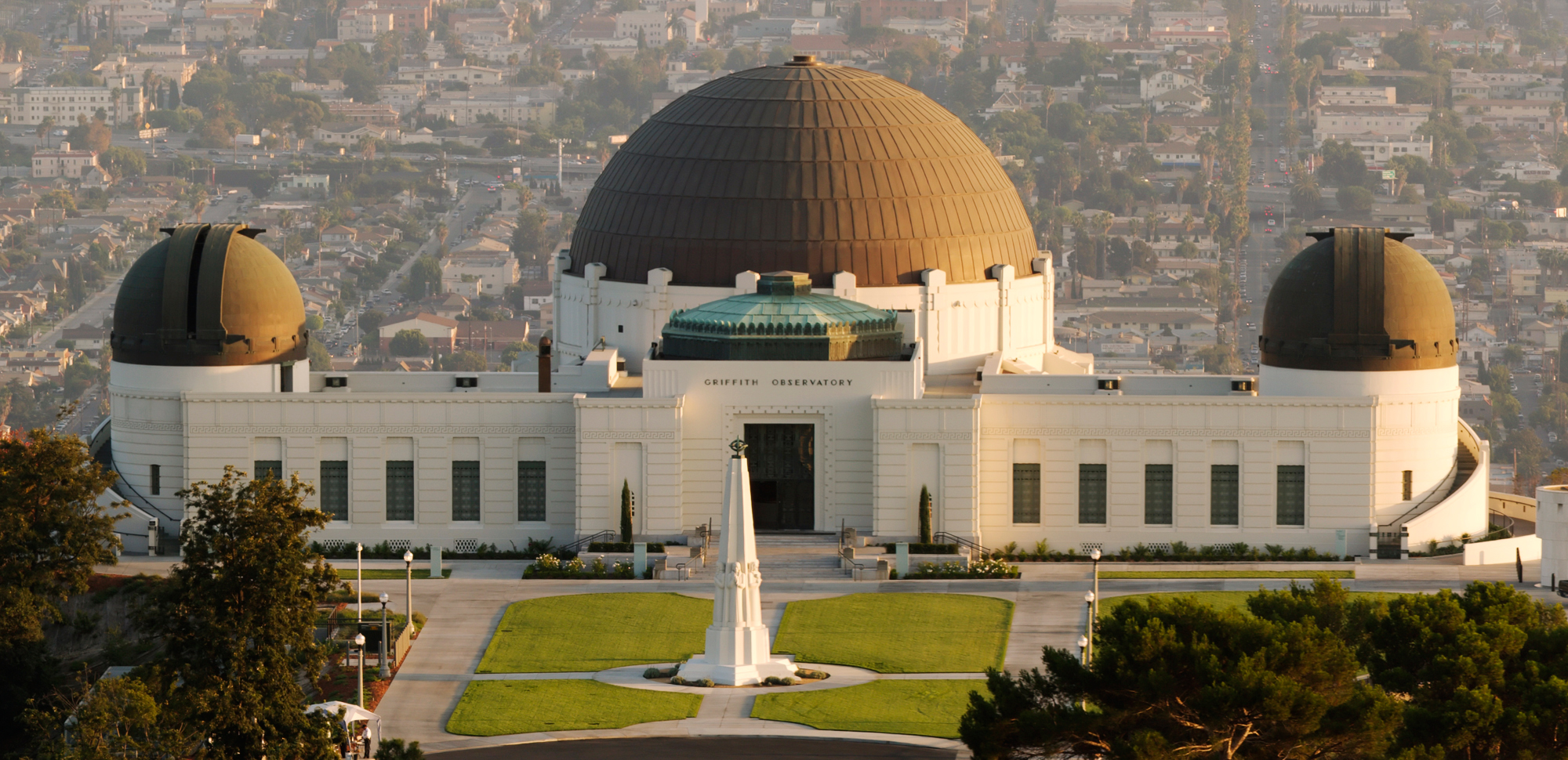
"The Catalyst", the album's first single, was first performed live at the Griffith Observatory (pictured).

During the announcement of the album's release date, Linkin Park said the album's first single would be "The Catalyst", which was released on August 2, 2010. From July 9, 2010, until July 25, 2010, the band held a contest titled "Linkin Park, Featuring You". In the contest, fans could download stems from "The Catalyst", remix the stems and/or write their own parts for the song on any instrument. The winner of this contest was Czeslaw "NoBraiN" Sakowski from Świdnica, Poland, whose remix is featured as an extra track on a version of the album made available from Best Buy and Napster. The album's liner notes credit Sakowski with "supplemental programming" on "When They Come for Me". The top 20 remixes that were selected by the band are being considered for future use as b-sides and online downloads.

Two of the remixes by DIGITALOMAT and ill Audio have since been released via the band's webpage as free mp3 downloads, while two by Cale Pellick and DJ Endorphin been released on an exclusive German release of "The Catalyst". The music video for "The Catalyst", directed by Joe Hahn, premiered on August 26, 2010. On August 31, 2010, it was announced that the band would give their first live performance of the single at the 2010 MTV Video Music Awards on September 12, 2010, at Griffith Observatory. The venue was kept secret until the performance, although it was revealed to be a prominent landmark in Los Angeles. The single peaked at number one on the Billboard Rock Songs and Alternative Songs charts, and on the UK Rock Chart. The single also peaked at number twenty-seven in the Billboard Hot 100 upon the release of A Thousand Suns, and spent five weeks on the chart. "The Catalyst" was certified gold by the Recording Industry Association of America (RIAA) in July 2011.

On September 2, 2010, Linkin Park released the promotional single "Wretches and Kings" to those who had pre-ordered the album. On September 8, 2010, the band debuted "Waiting for the End" and "Blackout" on their Myspace page. The band announced on its official website the "Full Experience Myspace Premiere", the streaming of the entire album on its Myspace page on September 10. A remix of "Blackout" by Renholdër was included in the soundtrack of Underworld: Awakening.

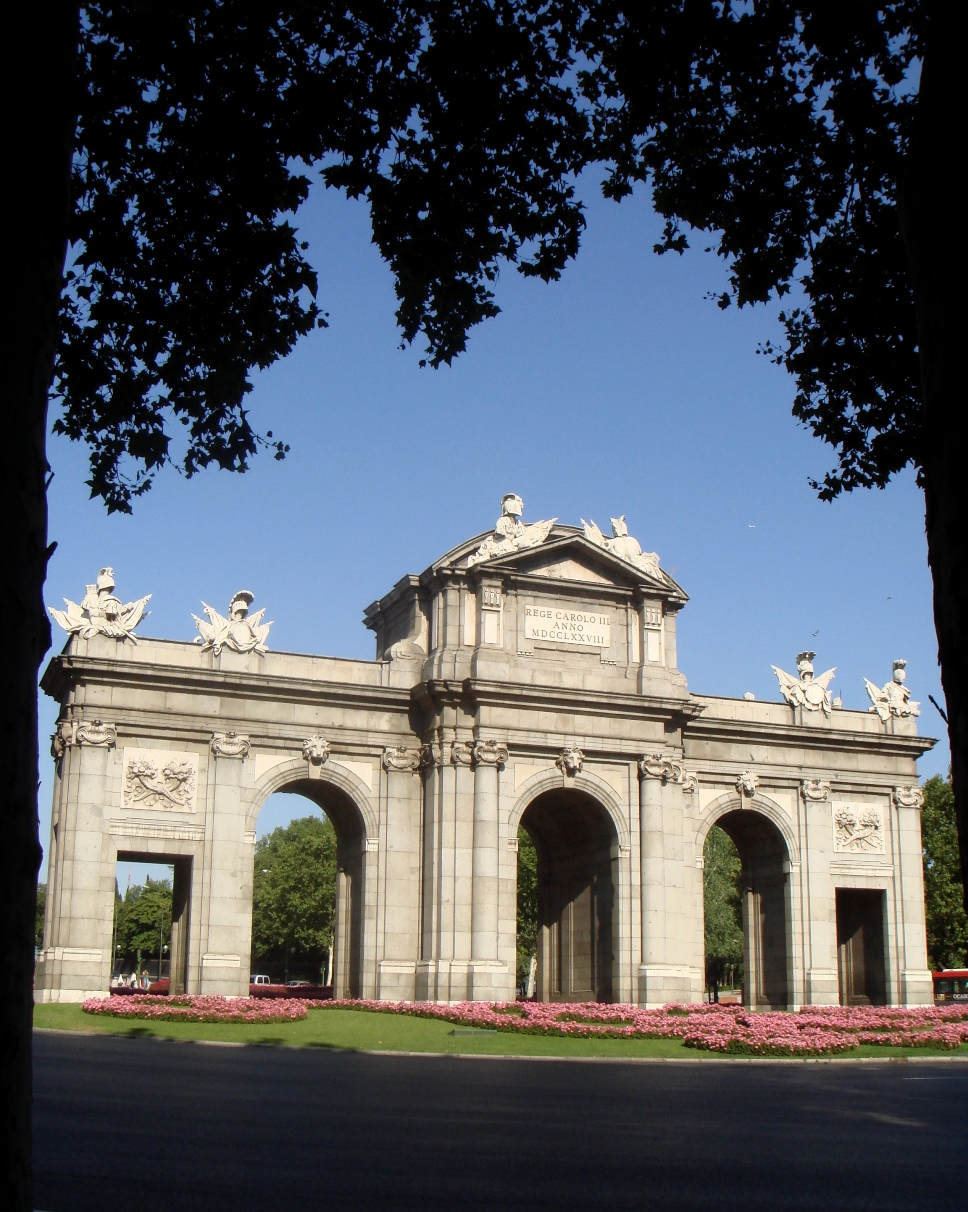
"Waiting for the End", the album's second single, was performed at the Puerta de Alcalá Gate (pictured).

"Waiting for the End" was released as the album's second single on October 1, 2010. The music video for the song premiered on October 8, 2010, and was directed by Joe Hahn. Linkin Park's performance of "Waiting for the End" at Puerta de Alcala in Madrid was broadcast as part of the 2010 MTV Europe Music Awards. "Waiting for the End" and "When They Come for Me" were performed live on Saturday Night Live on February 5, 2011. "Waiting for the End" was featured in an episode of CSI: Crime Scene Investigation broadcast on CBS on October 14, 2010. The single peaked at number one on the Alternative Songs chart; it was Linkin Park's tenth number-one song on the chart. It peaked at number two on the Rock Songs chart and at number forty-two on the Billboard Hot 100, spending nine weeks on the chart. The single achieved success in other countries, peaking at number thirty-four in Austria, number twenty in Belgium, number 29 in Germany, and number thirty-four in Japan. "Waiting for the End" was certified gold by the RIAA in April 2011.

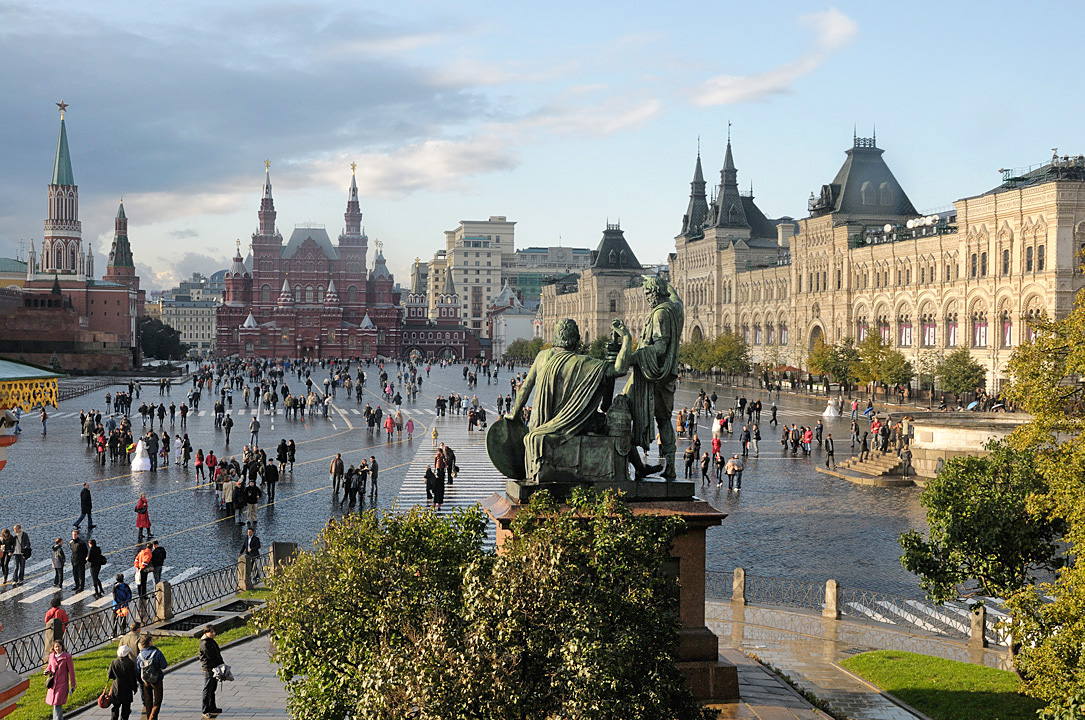
The radio edit of "Iridescent", the album's fourth single, was performed live at Red Square (pictured) in Moscow.

On January 22, 2011, Linkin Park announced that its next international single would be "Burning in the Skies". The music video, directed by Hahn, premiered on February 22 and the single was released on March 21. The single reached number thirty-five in Austria, number 35 in Portugal, number twenty-six in German airplay, and number six in Mexico.

On April 13, 2011, Shinoda confirmed that the album's third US, fourth international, and overall final single would be "Iridescent". He also said a slightly shorter version of the song would be included the soundtrack of the movie Transformers: Dark of the Moon, and that a music video directed by Hahn had been made to promote the single. Linkin Park performed the single remix of "Iridescent" at the film's premiere at Red Square, Moscow, on June 23, 2011. The single peaked at number eighty-one at the Billboard Hot 100, spending three weeks on the chart; it also peaked at number nineteen at the Alternative Songs chart and number twenty-nine at the Rock Songs chart. Despite these low peaks, the single achieved moderate success in other countries, peaking at number thirty-nine in Australia, number ten in Israel, and number two in South Korea and one in the UK Rock Chart.

== Reception ==
=== Commercial ===
A Thousand Suns debuted at number one on the US Billboard 200 chart with first-week sales of 241,000 copies in the United States, exceeding sales of Trey Songz's Passion, Pain & Pleasure by 1,000, according to Nielsen SoundScan. It became Linkin Park's fourth US number-one album, although the first-week sales were significantly lower than those of their previous album Minutes to Midnight (2007), which opened at 623,000 copies. The album entered Billboard's Rock Albums, Alternative Albums, Hard Rock Albums, and Digital Albums charts at number one. In the second week, the album slid to number three, selling 70,000 copies; in December 2010, two months after its release, its sales passed the half-million mark. On January 11, 2011, A Thousand Suns was certified gold by the RIAA for shipments of 500,000 copies sold in the US. It spent 30 weeks on the Billboard 200. By June 2014, the album had sold 906,000 copies in the US according to SoundScan.

In Canada, A Thousand Suns peaked at number one on the Canadian Albums Chart with 23,000 copies sold. In February 2011, the album was certified platinum by the Canadian Recording Industry Association for 80,000 units sold. In the United Kingdom album chart, on which it spent seventeen weeks, the album debuted at number two with first-week sales of 46,711 copies, behind the Script's album Science & Faith. On September 10, 2010, two days after the album's UK release, A Thousand Suns was certified gold by the British Phonographic Industry (BPI), marking shipments of 100,000 copies to retailers. In Australia, it debuted at number one on the ARIA Top 50 Albums, and retained the top position for four weeks. The album remained in the chart's top 50 for 18 weeks. By the end of 2010, A Thousand Suns had been certified gold by the Australian Recording Industry Association (ARIA), and the following year it was certified platinum.

=== Critical reception ===
Professional ratings
Aggregate scores
Source	Rating
Metacritic	66/100
Review scores
Source	Rating
AllMusic	3.5/5 stars
Artistdirect	5/5 stars
Consequence of Sound	3.5/5 stars
Entertainment Weekly	B
Kerrang!	4/5 stars
Melodic	4/5 stars
New York Daily News	1/5 stars
Rock Sound	7/10
Rolling Stone	3/5 stars
Spin	6/10

According to the review aggregator Metacritic, A Thousand Suns received "generally favorable reviews" based on a weighted average score of 66 out of 100 from 10 critic scores.

Rick Florino of Artistdirect gave the album five stars out of five, saying, "after A Thousand Suns, all rock 'n' roll will revolve around Linkin Park"; he credited Linkin Park with creating their own genre. Ian Winwood of Kerrang! gave it an "excellent" rating, saying it "can only be best described as a political album". He praised the songwriting, saying, "These are songs that have been constructed as much as they've been written", and that its closest comparison was Public Enemy's 1990 album Fear of a Black Planet. Dave de Sylvia of Sputnikmusic called it "an extremely well-crafted rock album," saying it was somewhat better than its predecessor Minutes to Midnight (2007), but does not live up to their debut, Hybrid Theory (2000). David Buchanan of Consequence of Sound gave the album three-and-a-half out of five, saying, "Some might argue this new sound is posturing, complete mutation to the point of absurdity; in the band's associated artwork and videos, evolution has been touted from day one. In essence, Linkin Park has been chasing this all along, and now it has become tangible, complete." Johan Wippsson from Melodic said Linkin Park "have created a very cool and unique sound" and described "Blackout" and "When They Come for Me" as "really innovative". Ian Winwood of BBC Music, in his review of the band's succeeding album Living Things, praised A Thousand Suns and described it as "a body of work startling enough that it gambled with the massive commercial success the group had achieved since their debut album, 2000's Hybrid Theory."

James Montgomery of MTV called A Thousand Suns a "sprawling, discordant, ambitious and an all-out game changer" and compared it with Radiohead's 2000 album Kid A, but said A Thousand Suns is more optimistic than Kid A. Jordy Kasko with Review Rinse Repeat gave A Thousand Suns a perfect rating, calling it an "epic quest". He compared it to Pink Floyd's The Dark Side of the Moon (1973) and Radiohead's Kid A, saying "A Thousand Suns is an ALBUM. It is not a collection of songs. It is not meant to be listened to as such. The band is going so far as to release an iTunes version that is one track, 47 minutes and 56 seconds long. This is no more an 'album' by conventional standards than Dark Side of the Moon or Kid A are. Sure, there are identifiable songs, but to understand or to appreciate any of them you must take them in the context of the entire album." Christopher Weingarten of The Village Voice praised the album, calling it "2010's best avant-rock nuclear-anxiety concept record", as well as comparing it to Radiohead's OK Computer (1997).

Mikael Wood of Spin gave the album six stars out of ten, saying it "contains plenty of aggressively arty material" and calling "The Messenger" the "most unexpected track on the boldly conceived A Thousand Suns". Leah Greenblatt of Entertainment Weekly gave the album a B rating and said "at times the band's odd mélange of industrial grind, hip-hop swagger, and teenage-wasteland angst feels jarring". Jody Rosen of Rolling Stone gave it three stars out of five; he said Linkin Park were "feeling their way toward a new identity"; he called their skill for melody "obvious" and said they sounded like "a killer Linkin Park tribute band". Australia's Music Network magazine gave the album a mixed review, calling it "a radical shift for the band, but it's also a very uneven one ... while there's some commanding moments ('The Catalyst,' 'Wretches and Kings'), many of the tracks feel like experiments rather than fully-formed songs".

Johnny Firecloud of Antiquiet condemned the album, called it a "melodramatic farce", and said it was a "mechanized mess of sentimentality ... the 15 track collection is entirely unconvincing as a call to action for uprising and activism". Stephen Thomas Erlewine of AllMusic said the album was a "clear continuation" of its predecessor but said "the problem is, the subdued rhythms, riffs and raps of A Thousand Suns wind up monochromatic". Jim Farber of The New York Daily News gave the album one star out of five, saying, "no fewer than 15 cuts crowd the tight 47-minute length of the CD, many of them fragments or, more accurately, sonic non sequiturs". Jamie Primack of The Badger Herald wrote, "there are at least five filler tracks that contain nothing more than noise and sound bites ... the full-length songs aren't particularly daring or interesting".

Fans of the band were polarized by A Thousand Suns. Initial signs of the fans' division over the band's new material occurred when "The Catalyst" was released as a single. MTV conducted a poll asking fans how they received the song; most responses were positive but a large number were dissatisfied with it. Fans then therefore debated on what they thought of the new sound. Sara Ferrer of Orange County Reloaded said the album split the views of fans and critics into "love-it versus hate-it groups". Montgomery expressed similar sentiments, saying the album "alternately thrilled and thinned [Linkin Park's] substantial fanbase with its vast swaths of sonic sprawl (and overall lack of guitar solos)." Mike Shinoda shared his thoughts on the divided reception of the fans; he thanked the people who accepted the album and defended it from the criticism of those who disliked it. Commenting on fans' polarized response to the album, Chester Bennington said, "[A Thousand Suns] is definitely something that we knew people would need to digest and get over the fact that it's not what they thought we would do."

==== Retrospective reviews ====
Retrospective reviews of the album have been overwhelmingly positive. In 2021, Blunt Magazine re-evaluated the album, appraising and describing it as a "rap metal supernova". Kerrang!, revisiting the album the same year, described it as a "daring concept album" and ranked it as the band's third best album behind Meteora (2003) and their debut Hybrid Theory (2000).

==== Accolades ====
Kerrang! listed A Thousand Suns as the nineteenth-best album of 2010 on their list of the top 20 albums that year. James Montgomery of MTV listed the album as twentieth best album of 2010, calling it "the year's most ambitious major-label rock album... there's no denying the dense, dark power it packs".

The album received numerous awards and nominations. At the 2011 MTV Video Music Aid Japan, A Thousand Suns was nominated for Album of the Year, while "The Catalyst" was nominated for Best Group Video and Best Rock Video. The album received two 2011 Billboard Music Award nominations; Best Rock Album and Top Alternative Album. "Waiting for the End" was nominated for Top Alternative Song. The music video for "Waiting for the End" was nominated at the 2011 MTV Video Music Awards for Best Special Effects. Linkin Park won the Best International Rock/Alternative Group for A Thousand Suns at the 2011 ECHO Awards. At the MTV Video Game Awards, "Blackout" won the Best Song in a Video Game award for its use in FIFA 11. "Waiting for the End" was nominated at the 2011 Teen Choice Awards for Choice Rock Song.

== Track listing ==
All tracks are written by Linkin Park except "Wisdom, Justice and Love" credited to Linkin Park and Martin Luther King Jr.

No.	Title	Length
1.	"The Requiem"	2:01
2.	"The Radiance"	0:57
3.	"Burning in the Skies"	4:13
4.	"Empty Spaces"	0:18
5.	"When They Come for Me"	4:53
6.	"Robot Boy"	4:29
7.	"Jornada del Muerto"	1:34
8.	"Waiting for the End"	3:51
9.	"Blackout"	4:39
10.	"Wretches and Kings"	4:10
11.	"Wisdom, Justice, and Love"	1:39
12.	"Iridescent"	4:56
13.	"Fallout"	1:23
14.	"The Catalyst"	5:39
15.	"The Messenger"	3:01
Total length:		47:48

Best Buy, Napster and HMV Limited edition bonus tracks

No.	Title	Length
16.	"New Divide"	4:29
17.	"Blackbirds"	3:22
18.	"The Catalyst" (NoBraiN remix)	4:22

iTunes deluxe edition bonus tracks

No.	Title	Length
16.	"A Thousand Suns: The Full Experience" (entire album in one track)	47:56
17.	"The Catalyst" (music video)	4:42
18.	"Blackbirds" (non-album track from the "8-Bit Rebellion!" app)	3:21
Total length:		63:44

2013 iTunes deluxe edition bonus tracks

No.	Title	Length
16.	"Blackbirds"	3:21
17.	"The Catalyst" (music video)	4:43
18.	"Waiting for the End" (music video)	3:54
Total length:		59:54

Japanese edition bonus track

No.	Title	Length
16.	"New Divide" (live in Madrid)	4:35
Total length:		52:23

iTunes UK special edition bonus tracks

No.	Title	Length
16.	"New Divide" (live in Madrid)	4:35
17.	"Waiting for the End" (live in Madrid)	4:04
18.	"Breaking the Habit" (live in Madrid)	4:00
19.	"The Catalyst" (live in Madrid)	5:57
20.	"In the End" (live in Madrid)	3:48
21.	"What I've Done" (live in Madrid)	3:32
Total length:		73:41

Special edition bonus DVD

No.	Title	Length
1.	"Meeting of A Thousand Suns" (making of the album documentary)	29:46
Total length:		29:46

A Thousand Suns + bonus DVD (Live from Madrid)

No.	Title	Length
1.	"The Requiem"	1:38
2.	"Wretches and Kings"	4:25
3.	"Papercut"	3:18
4.	"New Divide"	4:31
5.	"Faint"	4:08
6.	"Empty Spaces/When They Come for Me"	5:31
7.	"Waiting for the End"	3:53
8.	"Iridescent"	5:02
9.	"Numb"	3:11
10.	"The Radiance" (piano version)	1:50
11.	"Breaking the Habit"	3:59
12.	"Shadow of the Day"	5:15
13.	"Fallout"	1:25
14.	"The Catalyst"	6:10
15.	"The Messenger"	3:41
16.	"In the End"	3:29
17.	"What I've Done"	3:32
18.	"Bleed It Out/A Place for My Head"	5:06
Total length:		70:04

A Thousand Suns – Live Around the World

No.	Title	Length
1.	"The Requiem" (live from London, 2010)	2:30
2.	"Burning in the Skies" (live from Hamburg, 2011)	4:12
3.	"When They Come for Me" (live from Paris, 2010)	5:06
4.	"Jornada Del Muerto" (live from Hamburg, 2011)	1:50
5.	"Waiting for the End" (live from Berlin, 2010)	3:56
6.	"Blackout" (live from Hamburg, 2011)	4:34
7.	"Wretches and Kings" (live from Las Vegas, 2011)	3:54
8.	"Iridescent" (live from Paris, 2010)	4:58
9.	"The Catalyst" (live from Paris, 2010)	5:54
10.	"The Messenger" (live from Las Vegas, 2011)	3:53

iTunes deluxe edition bonus content

No.	Title	Length
1.	"The Requiem" (Note from the band)
2.	"20 'In the Studio' exclusive photos"
3.	"Meeting of A Thousand Suns (Making of the Album)"	29:46
4.	"Linkin Park visualizers"
5.	"Secret code puzzle"
6.	"The Catalyst (music video)"

=== Samples ===
- "The Radiance" features a portion of an interview with J. Robert Oppenheimer
- "Wretches and Kings" features a portion of the speech, "Operation of the Machine" by Mario Savio
- "Wisdom, Justice, and Love" features a portion of the speech, "Beyond Vietnam: A Time to Break Silence" by Martin Luther King Jr.

== Personnel ==
Source: AllMusic and A Thousand Suns booklet.

Linkin Park

- Chester Bennington – vocals, lyrics, percussion, rhythm guitar (12)
- Mike Shinoda – vocals, lyrics, rhythm guitar, lead guitar (3), keyboards, sampler, piano, synthesizer; vocoder (1, 13), producer, engineer, creative director, Pro Tools
- Brad Delson – lead guitar, rhythm guitar (3), sampler, backing vocals, keyboards, percussion, acoustic guitar (15), megaphone (5), additional Pro Tools editing
- Dave "Phoenix" Farrell – bass, backing vocals, keyboards (9)
- Joe Hahn – turntables, samples, programming, backing vocals, creative director
- Rob Bourdon – drums, percussion, backing vocals

Additional musician

- Czeslaw "NoBraiN" Sakowski – programming on the outro of "When They Come for Me"

Production

- Rick Rubin – producer
- Ethan Mates – engineer, Pro Tools
- Josh Newell – engineer, Pro Tools
- Neal Avron – mixing
- Nicolas Fournier – mixing assistance
- Vlado Meller – mastering
- Mark Santangelo – mastering assistance
- Lindsay Chase – production coordination
- Ryan DeMarti – production coordination
- Jerry Johnson – drum technician
- Frank Maddocks – art direction, design, creative director
- Josh Vanover – artwork, creative director
- Ellen Wakayama – creative director

== Charts ==
=== Weekly charts ===
Weekly chart performance for A Thousand Suns
Chart (2010)	Peak position
Australian Albums (ARIA)	1
Austrian Albums (Ö3 Austria)	1
Belgian Albums (Ultratop Flanders)	2
Belgian Albums (Ultratop Wallonia)	4
Canadian Albums (Billboard)	1
Czech Albums (ČNS IFPI)	1
Danish Albums (Hitlisten)	2
Dutch Albums (Album Top 100)	7
European Albums (Billboard)	1
Finnish Albums (Suomen virallinen lista)	6
French Albums (SNEP)	4
German Albums (Offizielle Top 100)	1
Greek Albums (IFPI)	2
Hungarian Albums (MAHASZ)	3
Irish Albums (IRMA)	3
Italian Albums (FIMI)	1
Japan Hot Albums (Billboard Japan)	2
Japanese Albums (Oricon)	2
Mexican Albums (Top 100 Mexico)	28
New Zealand Albums (RMNZ)	1
Norwegian Albums (VG-lista)	4
Polish Albums (ZPAV)	2
Portuguese Albums (AFP)	1
Russian Albums (2M)	3
Scottish Albums (Official Charts)	4
South Korean Albums (Circle)	4
South Korean International Albums (Circle)	1
Spanish Albums (Promusicae)	3
Swedish Albums (Sverigetopplistan)	5
Swiss Albums (Romandie)	1
Swiss Albums (Schweizer Hitparade)	1
UK Albums (Official Charts)	2
UK Rock & Metal Albums (Official Charts)	1
US Billboard 200	1
US Top Alternative Albums (Billboard)	1
US Top Hard Rock Albums (Billboard)	1
US Top Rock Albums (Billboard)	1

2017 weekly chart performance for A Thousand Suns
Chart (2017)	Peak position
Australian Albums (ARIA)	47

=== Year-end charts ===
2010 year-end chart performance for A Thousand Suns
Chart (2010)	Position
Australian Albums (ARIA)	33
Austrian Albums (Ö3 Austria)	10
Belgian Albums (Ultratop Wallonia)	92
Canadian Albums (Billboard)	40
Danish Albums (Hitlisten)	86
European Albums (Billboard)	22
Finnish Albums (Suomen viralinen lista)	6
French Albums (SNEP)	70
German Albums (Offizielle Top 100)	11
Italian Albums (FIMI)	63
Japanese Albums (Oricon)	50
New Zealand Albums (RMNZ)	34
Polish Albums (ZPAV)	46
Russian Albums (2M)	26
South Korean International Albums (Circle)	28
Swiss Albums (Schweizer Hitparade)	16
UK Albums (OCC)	109
US Billboard 200	53
US Top Alternative Albums (Billboard)	5
US Top Hard Rock Albums (Billboard)	2
US Top Rock Albums (Billboard)	7

2011 year-end chart performance for A Thousand Suns
Chart (2011)	Position
German Albums (Offizielle Top 100)	87
Swiss Albums (Schweizer Hitparade)	86
UK Albums (OCC)	184
US Billboard 200	107
US Top Alternative Albums (Billboard)	12
US Top Hard Rock Albums (Billboard)	3
US Top Rock Albums (Billboard)	15

=== Decade-end charts ===
Decade-end chart performance for A Thousand Suns
Chart (2010–2019)	Position
US Top Rock Albums (Billboard)	39

== Certifications ==
Certifications and sales for A Thousand Suns
Region	Certification	Certified units/sales
Australia (ARIA)	Platinum	70,000^{^}
Austria (IFPI Austria)	Gold	10,000^{*}
Brazil (Pro-Música Brasil)	Gold	20,000^{*}
Canada (Music Canada)	Platinum	80,000^{^}
Denmark (IFPI Danmark)	Gold	15,000^{^}
Finland (Musiikkituottajat)	Gold	13,977
France (SNEP)	Gold	50,000^{*}
GCC (IFPI Middle East)	Gold	3,000^{*}
Germany (BVMI)	3× Gold	300,000^{^}
Ireland (IRMA)	Gold	7,500^{^}
Italy (FIMI)	Platinum	50,000^{‡}
Japan (RIAJ)	Gold	100,000^{^}
New Zealand (RMNZ)	Platinum	15,000^{‡}
Poland (ZPAV)	Platinum	20,000^{*}
Russia (NFPF)	Platinum	10,000^{*}
Switzerland (IFPI Switzerland)	Gold	15,000^{^}
United Kingdom (BPI)	Platinum	300,000^{‡}
United States (RIAA)	Platinum	1,000,000^{‡}
^{*} Sales figures based on certification alone.^{^} Shipments figures based on certification alone.^{‡} Sales+streaming figures based on certification alone.

== Release history ==
Release dates and formats for A Thousand Suns
Region	Date	Format(s)
Australia	September 8, 2010	Digital download, CD, LP, DVD
Austria	September 8, 2010	Digital download, CD, LP, DVD
Belgium	September 8, 2010	Digital download, CD, LP, DVD
Canada	September 8, 2010	Digital download, CD, LP, DVD
Denmark	September 8, 2010	Digital download, CD, LP, DVD
Finland	September 8, 2010	Digital download, CD, LP, DVD
France	September 8, 2010	Digital download, CD, LP, DVD
Germany	September 8, 2010	Digital download, CD, LP, DVD
Greece	September 8, 2010	Digital download, CD, LP, DVD
Ireland	September 8, 2010	Digital download, CD, LP, DVD
Italy	September 8, 2010	Digital download, CD, LP, DVD
Luxembourg	September 8, 2010	Digital download, CD, LP, DVD
Mexico	September 8, 2010	Digital download, CD, LP, DVD
Netherlands	September 8, 2010	Digital download, CD, LP, DVD
New Zealand	September 8, 2010	Digital download, CD, LP, DVD
Norway	September 8, 2010	Digital download, CD, LP, DVD
Portugal	September 8, 2010	Digital download, CD, LP, DVD
Spain	September 8, 2010	Digital download, CD, LP, DVD
Sweden	September 8, 2010	Digital download, CD, LP, DVD
Switzerland	September 8, 2010	Digital download, CD, LP, DVD
United Kingdom	September 8, 2010	Digital download, CD, LP, DVD
Hungary	September 9, 2010	Digital download, CD, LP, DVD
Poland	September 13, 2010	Digital download, CD, LP, DVD
Brazil	September 14, 2010	Digital download, CD, LP, DVD
United States	September 14, 2010	Digital download, CD, LP, DVD
Japan	September 15, 2010; September 29, 2010; November 24, 2010	Digital download, CD, CD+DVD; Gunpla 30th Edition
