= The Catalyst =

2010 single by Linkin Park

Single by Linkin Park

from the album A Thousand Suns and Medal of Honor
- B-side: "New Divide" (Live)
- Released: August 2, 2010
- Genre: Electronic rock; techno; experimental rock; alternative rock
- Length: 5:40 (album version); 5:42 (single version); 4:44 (radio edit)
- Label: E.A.R.S; Warner Bros.
- Composer: Linkin Park
- Lyricists: Chester Bennington; Mike Shinoda
- Producers: Rick Rubin; Mike Shinoda

Linkin Park singles chronology
| "Not Alone" (2010) | "The Catalyst" (2010) | "Waiting for the End" (2010) |

Audio sample
- file; help

Music video
- "The Catalyst" on YouTube

"The Catalyst" is a song by the American rock band Linkin Park. Released on August 2, 2010, it is the first single from their fourth studio album, A Thousand Suns, which was released on September 8, 2010. The music video for the song, directed by the band's turntablist Joe Hahn, was released on August 25, 2010.

"The Catalyst" is used in the trailer and credits of the video game Medal of Honor and also the opening song of Namco-Bandai's Arcade game, Mobile Suit Gundam: Extreme Vs.. It was also used in select commercials of the Discovery Channel series, Surviving the Cut. The song was also featured in the video game Linkin Park Revenge for the iPhone, iPad, and iPod Touch. "The Catalyst" has also been used in the advertisement for the 2011 movie The Lincoln Lawyer with Matthew McConaughey.

"The Catalyst", along with five other songs from A Thousand Suns, are featured in the "Linkin Park Track Pack" as downloadable content for the rhythm video game Guitar Hero: Warriors of Rock. The track pack was released on October 19, 2010.

== Background ==
From July 9, 2010, until July 25, 2010, Linkin Park (in collaboration with MySpace.com) held the contest "Linkin Park, Featuring You". In this contest, fans could download stems from the album's first single, "The Catalyst", remix the stems and/or write their own parts for the song on any instrument. The winner of this contest was Czesław "NoBraiN" Sakowski from Świdnica, Poland, whose remix was featured as an additional downloadable track on the Best Buy version of A Thousand Suns, and also available on Napster. The liner notes for A Thousand Suns also credit Sakowski with "Supplemental Programming" on "When They Come for Me", the album's fifth track.

The top 20 remixes that were selected by the band are being considered for future use as b-sides and online downloads, as seen in the "Linkin Park, featuring YOU Winner" episode of the band's LPTV series. Two of the remixes (by DIGITALOMAT and ill Audio) have since been released as via the band's webpage as free mp3 downloads, while two others (by Cale Pellick and DJ Endorphin) have been released via the iTunes EP version, released exclusively in Europe.

"The Catalyst" has also been featured in the trailer of the video game Medal of Honor, which premiered on August 1, 2010, and was directed by Joe Hahn. It was also featured in the game's end credits. The song was also featured in commercials of Discovery Channel's Shark Week in the summer of 2010. It was also used during the 16th annual X Games competition. On September 15, 2010, Warner Music Japan announced that the song will be the official theme song of Mobile Suit Gundam: Extreme Vs.

On August 31, 2010, it was announced that the band would perform the single live for the first time at the 2010 MTV Video Music Awards on September 12, 2010. The venue of the debut live performance was Griffith Observatory, an iconic location used in Hollywood movies. However, the venue was held secret until the performance but was revealed to be a prominent landmark of Los Angeles. The clip for the 2010 VMAs performance was shown at the 2017 edition, as a tribute to Bennington, who died a month before the awards show.

Speaking to MTV News when the single was released, bassist Dave Farrell would further elaborate how the sound of "The Catalyst" would end up fitting into the grander scheme of things when it came to the then-forthcoming album A Thousand Suns.

"We wanted a track that represented where the album was going to be and how it was going to work, and this was really the track to do that. It's a risk, but worth it."

== Music video ==
A behind-the-scenes screenshot of the music video, showing lead vocalists Chester Bennington and Mike Shinoda, lead guitarist Brad Delson and bassist Dave "Phoenix" Farrell throwing colored powder at each other.

The video for the song was filmed in July and was also directed by Joe Hahn. According to bassist Phoenix, the video contains references to the Bhagavad Gita as well as the Christian apocalypse, with Joe Hahn saying it was influenced by J. Robert Oppenheimer. These are three themes that are also used in the album. When coming up with the idea for the video, Hahn said he thought about what it would be like if mankind had to accept their fate in a time of despair.

The video premiered on August 26, 2010. The video begins at a foggy town and Mike is seen singing in his Stone Island hoodie in a rusted car and the scene then shows people running from the town. The entire town is covered in smoke. The band members are shown in remains of buildings, and Chester sings while submerged in water. Numerous people with gas masks are shown. Later in the video, the people clash with the gas-masked-men, throwing powder at each other, while the band members throw powder at each other as well. The video ends with Chester, still being submerged in water.

== Covers ==
Pendulum covered the song on September 22, 2010, on BBC Radio 1 as part of the Live Lounge show.

== Reception ==
"The Catalyst" has been met with generally positive reception from critics. Jason Lipshutz of Billboard called the song a "nearly six-minute anthem of aggression", emphasizing on the transition from electronica to a slow dirge midway through the track. He also added that it recalls the vocal chants from Muse and political commentaries from Green Day, which the band fuses to create "an original, if a bit awkward, transition from twisty techno to fist-pumping rock". Jason Treuen of The Music Network, in his review of A Thousand Suns, called the song "the best distillation of Linkin Park 2.0", and concluded by noting that "If [the album] was a film, this would be the victorious fight scene.". The New York Post named "The Catalyst" the 139th best song of 2010, saying "An electronic rave transforms into a power ballad."

== Commercial performance ==
"The Catalyst" debuted at No. 1 on the US Billboard Rock Songs chart, with 12.2 million audience impressions. It became the first song in the chart's 14-month history to debut at the top spot. This gave the band their second No. 1 single on the chart, tying them with Alice in Chains and Three Days Grace for most No. 1 singles on the chart. It also debuted at No. 3 on the US Alternative Songs chart, becoming the band's fourteenth top five single on the chart (placing them behind Green Day for most top five's on the chart). In its third week on the chart, it reached No. 1, becoming the band's ninth No. 1 on the chart, and tied for second most across all artists on the chart. Although the song charted high on the Rock and Alternative Songs charts, it was one of the band's lowest-charting songs on the US Mainstream Rock Tracks chart, peaking just outside the top ten at No. 12. Additionally, it debuted at No. 35 on the US Billboard Hot 100, selling 60,000 downloads in its first week, and became the band's ninth top forty single on the Hot 100. After its debut, it fell to No. 89, but "The Catalyst" rebounded to No. 72 and eventually peaked at No. 27 upon the release of A Thousand Suns. The song debuted at No. 20 on the US Billboard Hot Digital Songs chart in its first week. It achieved a Gold certification from the RIAA.

== Track listing ==
All songs written and composed by Linkin Park.

CD single
| No. | Title | Length |
|---|---|---|
| 1. | "The Catalyst" | 5:44 |
| 2. | "New Divide" (Live) | 4:55 |

Digital download
| No. | Title | Length |
|---|---|---|
| 1. | "The Catalyst" | 5:42 |

NoBraiN remix single
| No. | Title | Length |
|---|---|---|
| 1. | "The Catalyst" (feat. NoBraiN) | 4:22 |

iTunes EP
| No. | Title | Length |
|---|---|---|
| 1. | "The Catalyst" | 5:42 |
| 2. | "The Catalyst" ("Bobby Bloomfield" DIOYY? Remix) | 3:06 |
| 3. | "The Catalyst" (King Fantastic Remix) | 4:04 |
| 4. | "The Catalyst" (featuring DJ Endorphin) | 5:00 |
| 5. | "The Catalyst" (featuring Cale Pellick) | 3:31 |

Promotional radio CD single
| No. | Title | Length |
|---|---|---|
| 1. | "The Catalyst" (Radio Edit) | 4:44 |
| 2. | "The Catalyst" (Album Version) | 5:43 |
| 3. | "The Catalyst" (Pendulum Remix) | 4:20 |

== Charts ==
=== Weekly charts ===
Weekly chart performance for "The Catalyst"
| Chart (2010) | Peak position |
|---|---|
| Australia (ARIA) | 33 |
| Austria (Ö3 Austria Top 40) | 18 |
| Belgium (Ultratip Bubbling Under Flanders) | 6 |
| Belgium (Ultratop 50 Wallonia) | 44 |
| Canada Hot 100 (Billboard) | 28 |
| Canada Rock (Billboard) | 13 |
| Czech Republic Airplay (ČNS IFPI) | 19 |
| Germany (GfK) | 11 |
| Hungary (Single Top 40) | 8 |
| Italy (FIMI) | 34 |
| Mexico Ingles Airplay (Billboard) | 17 |
| Netherlands (Dutch Top 40 Tipparade) | 17 |
| Netherlands (Single Top 100) | 95 |
| New Zealand (Recorded Music NZ) | 27 |
| Scottish Singles Sales (Official Charts) | 40 |
| Slovakia Airplay (ČNS IFPI) | 46 |
| Sweden (Sverigetopplistan) | 31 |
| Switzerland (Schweizer Hitparade) | 29 |
| UK Singles (Official Charts) | 40 |
| UK Rock & Metal (Official Charts) | 1 |
| US Billboard Hot 100 | 27 |
| US Hot Rock & Alternative Songs (Billboard) | 1 |

=== Year-end charts ===
Year-end chart performance for "The Catalyst"
| Chart (2010) | Position |
|---|---|
| Japan Adult Contemporary (Billboard) | 67 |
| US Hot Rock & Alternative Songs (Billboard) | 40 |

== Certifications ==
Certifications and sales for "The Catalyst"
| Region | Certification | Certified units/sales |
|---|---|---|
| United States (RIAA) | Gold | 500,000^{*} |
^{*} Sales figures based on certification alone.
