= Burning in the Skies =

Single by Linkin Park

from the album A Thousand Suns
- B-side: "Blackout" (Live); "When They Come for Me" (Live)
- Released: March 21, 2011
- Studio: NRG Recording Studios (Los Angeles, CA)
- Genre: Alternative rock
- Length: 4:13 (album version); 4:01 (radio edit)
- Label: Warner Bros.
- Composer: Linkin Park
- Lyricists: Chester Bennington; Mike Shinoda
- Producers: Rick Rubin; Mike Shinoda

Linkin Park singles chronology
"Waiting for the End" (2010)	"Burning in the Skies" (2011)	"Iridescent" (2011)

Music video
- "Burning in the Skies" on YouTube

"Burning in the Skies" is a song by American rock band Linkin Park. It was announced as the band's third single from their fourth studio album, A Thousand Suns (2010), on January 20, 2011, and it was released on March 21. A music video for the single was directed by Joe Hahn, Linkin Park's turntablist. It was released in the United States to the Nielsen BDS adult contemporary indicator chart by February 2011, although it was clarified by vocalist Mike Shinoda that it is an international-only single, hence not charting in any Billboard charts.

"Burning in the Skies" (along with five other songs from A Thousand Suns) is featured in the "Linkin Park Track Pack" as downloadable content for the rhythm video game Guitar Hero: Warriors of Rock. The track pack was released on October 19, 2010.

== Music video ==
Filming for the music video occurred from January 17 through 19, 2011, with Joe Hahn and lead vocalist Mike Shinoda tweeting about filming the video.

The international music video was directed by Joe Hahn. The video premiered on kerrang.com on February 22. The video was also uploaded on YouTube by Linkin Park on their official YouTube channel linkinparktv. The entire video is in slow motion. It shows the final activities of random people (a teen party; a couple in a car; a girl in her bathroom; a young man seemingly working out; another girl studying with her computer; an old man dining alone; and a kid running with pajamas and a lion mask) before being caught in a blast radius of what seems to be a nuclear explosion in downtown Los Angeles. The explosion happens when the guitar solo starts. Then the band members are seen in darkness with effects similar to the ones used in the "Waiting for the End" music video, although they do not sing or perform their instruments in accordance to the song.

The behind-the-scenes video for "Burning in the Skies" was released on March 29, 2011.

== Reception ==
Jean Dean Wells of AOL Radio praised the song, saying that the band "delivered an upbeat track that could play just as easily on any pop radio station."

== Track listing ==
All tracks are written by Linkin Park.

CD single
No.	Title	Length
1.	"Burning in the Skies"	4:13
2.	"Blackout" (Live)	4:36

All tracks are written by Linkin Park.

iTunes EP
No.	Title	Length
1.	"Burning in the Skies"	4:13
2.	"Blackout" (Live)	4:36
3.	"When They Come for Me" (Live)	5:21

All tracks are written by Linkin Park.

Promotional radio CD single
No.	Title	Length
1.	"Burning in the Skies" (Edit)	4:01

== Personnel ==
- Chester Bennington – vocals
- Mike Shinoda – vocals, sampler, lead guitar, piano, keyboard
- Brad Delson – rhythm guitar
- Dave "Phoenix" Farrell – bass guitar, backing vocals
- Joe Hahn – turntables, samplers
- Rob Bourdon – drums, percussion

== Commercial performance ==
Since Shinoda confirmed that it is an international-only single, the single did not chart on any Billboard charts aside from debuting on the Rock Digital Song Sales chart for a solitary week at 37 solely on the strength of digital downloads of the song following the release of A Thousand Suns. The single received moderate success on the charts where it charted. It peaked within the Top 40 on the Austrian, German Airplay, and Portuguese charts, while it was a Top 20 hit on the UK Rock & Metal Chart peaking at number 16 and staying on the UK Rock & Metal charts for two weeks.

== Charts ==
Chart performance for "Burning in the Skies"
Chart (2010–11)	Peak position
Austria (Ö3 Austria Top 40)	35
Germany (GfK)	42
Germany Airplay (GfK)	28
Switzerland (Schweizer Hitparade)	41
UK Rock & Metal (Official Charts)	16
US Rock Digital Song Sales (Billboard)	37
