= Waiting for the End =

Single by Linkin Park

from the album A Thousand Suns
- B-side: "Waiting for the End" (The Glitch Mob Remix); "The Catalyst" ("Guitarmagedon" DIOYY? remix)
- Released: October 1, 2010
- Recorded: 2010
- Genre: Alternative rock; rap rock; trip hop; space rock
- Length: 3:51
- Label: Warner Bros.
- Composer: Linkin Park
- Lyricists: Chester Bennington; Mike Shinoda
- Producers: Rick Rubin; Mike Shinoda

Linkin Park singles chronology
"The Catalyst" (2010)	"Waiting for the End" (2010)	"Burning in the Skies" (2011)

Audio sample
- file; help

Music video
- "Waiting for the End" on YouTube "Waiting for the End" (live) on YouTube

Promotional single

"Waiting for the End" is a song by American rock band Linkin Park, released on October 1, 2010. A music video for the single, directed by Joe Hahn, was released on October 8, 2010, on MTV.

It received wide acclaim from critics and reached number 42 on the US Billboard Hot 100.

"Waiting for the End", along with five other songs from A Thousand Suns, is featured in the "Linkin Park Track Pack" as downloadable content for the rhythm video game Guitar Hero: Warriors of Rock. The track pack was released on October 19, 2010. It was also released as one of six Linkin Park songs released in a pack for Rock Band 3 on January 11, 2011, though it was the only track from A Thousand Suns to be included in that pack.

== Background ==
"Waiting for the End" was announced as the album's second single at the time of the album's release.

The track features minimal distorted guitar and differs from many previous Linkin Park singles. The song features verses by Mike Shinoda followed by both chorus and verses sung by Chester Bennington. The breakdown of the song uses remixed portions of Bennington's vocals.

This song was featured in the 11th season of CSI: Crime Scene Investigation on CBS on October 14, 2010.

== Music video ==
A screenshot of the music video, showing lead singer Chester Bennington being applied with digital effects.

The official music video is directed by Joe Hahn. The video was filmed in September 2010, before the release of A Thousand Suns and was released to MTV on Friday October 8, 2010. The video features the entire band performing the song in darkness along with heavily experimental digital effects and distortion applied to them. The video also carries the themes of the artwork for their album, A Thousand Suns, with many shots of abstract artworks featuring animals and digital-themed media.

Joe Hahn wrote a blog post describing the music video:

The clip is an experiment in making the most digital version of ourselves in the spirit of the visual palette of A Thousand Suns. If you have been following our visuals throughout this album, this is the next step in our journey. I wanted to push ourselves so far down the digital path that it eventually felt spiritual. As we live our lives in the digital noise of today, we can find our center of humanity in the midst of the chaos. This is my illustration of that.

In celebration of the band's North American tour, an alternate live video of the song premiered in the band's official site and YouTube channel. It was filmed by numerous fans on January 26, 2011, at the United Center in Chicago, and January 28 at the Xcel Energy Center in St. Paul. The version played in the video is the actual live performance of the song.

The video was placed at No. 28 of the year by VH1's Top 40 Videos of the Year.

== Reception ==
The reaction was largely positive. Michael Menachem of Billboard gave the song a positive review, saying " 'Waiting for the End' offers the grandness of 'Numb' and 'Faint', but producer Rick Rubin's polyrhythmic framework and the group's moralistic lyrics set it apart from Linkin Park's past hits." MTV's James Montgomery praised the song, describing it as "one part soaring, big-boned ballad, one part rattling, slightly Ragga dancehall toast, and zero parts anything LP have previously attempted." Tim Grierson of About.com listed the song as the seventh best rock song of 2010, saying that "Balancing rapped and sung vocals, the hopeful, resilient track builds to a beautifully rousing finale."

During a Twitch stream in 2020, Mike Shinoda revealed that "Waiting for the End" is his favourite Linkin Park song.

== Live performances ==
The song was performed live at the MTV Europe Music Awards in 2010. It was also performed on Saturday Night Live on February 5, 2011.

== Commercial performance ==
"Waiting for the End" debuted at number 96 on the US Billboard Hot 100 upon the release of the album. After falling off and re-entering the chart more than once, it has reached number 42, remaining 23 weeks on the chart. It has also obtained number 2 on the Rock Songs chart. After spending 15 weeks on the Alternative Songs chart, it replaced "Tighten Up" by the Black Keys at number 1, giving the band their tenth number 1 song on the chart. As of June 2014, the single has sold over 1,058,000 copies in the US, becoming their 9th best selling single in the US. Despite peaking lower than "The Catalyst", it was the most successful single in the US from the album. Outside the US, the song was generally less successful than "The Catalyst".

Chester Bennington said this about the success of the single in an interview with MTV on February 7, 2011:

It took two years for us to make that record, and it took that whole process for us to really digest the new music, so we knew that it was going to take people time to really let it settle... And 'Waiting for the End' is a perfect example of that ... it's taken it a while for it to elevate up the charts, and it went to No. 1 at the Alternative charts, and then kinda went back, and then went back to No. 1. ... People are getting it now. And I think, especially for our fans in the States, it was important for it to marinate for a little while before we came back and started playing these shows.

== Track listing ==
All songs written and composed by Linkin Park.

Digital single [1st version]
No.	Title	Length
1.	"Waiting for the End"	3:51
2.	"The Catalyst" ("Guitarmagedon" DIOYY? Remix)	3:06

CD • Digital single [2nd version]
No.	Title	Length
1.	"Waiting for the End"	3:51
2.	"Waiting for the End" (The Glitch Mob Remix)	4:54

Promotional radio CD single
No.	Title	Length
1.	"Waiting for the End"	3:51

== Charts ==
=== Weekly charts ===
Weekly chart performance for "Waiting for the End"
Chart (2010–11)	Peak position
Austria (Ö3 Austria Top 40)	34
Belgium (Ultratip Bubbling Under Flanders)	20
Canada Hot 100 (Billboard)	55
Canada Hot AC (Billboard)	41
Canada Rock (Billboard)	20
Czech Republic Airplay (ČNS IFPI)	34
Germany (GfK)	29
Mexico Ingles Airplay (Billboard)	25
Scottish Singles Sales (Official Charts)	83
Slovakia Airplay (ČNS IFPI)	64
Switzerland (Schweizer Hitparade)	58
UK Singles (Official Charts)	90
UK Rock & Metal (Official Charts)	3
US Billboard Hot 100	42
US Adult Pop Airplay (Billboard)	11
US Hot Rock & Alternative Songs (Billboard)	2
US Pop Airplay (Billboard)	21

=== Year-end charts ===
Year-end chart performance for "Waiting for the End"
Chart (2011)	Position
US Adult Top 40 (Billboard)	45
US Hot Rock & Alternative Songs (Billboard)	10

=== Decade-end charts ===
Decade-end chart performance for "Waiting for the End"
Chart (2010–19)	Position
US Hot Rock & Alternative Songs (Billboard)	48

== Certifications ==
Certifications for "Waiting for the End"
Region	Certification	Certified units/sales
New Zealand (RMNZ)	Gold	15,000^{‡}
United States (RIAA)	Platinum	1,000,000^{‡}
^{‡} Sales+streaming figures based on certification alone.
