= Linkin Park singles discography =

American rock band recordings

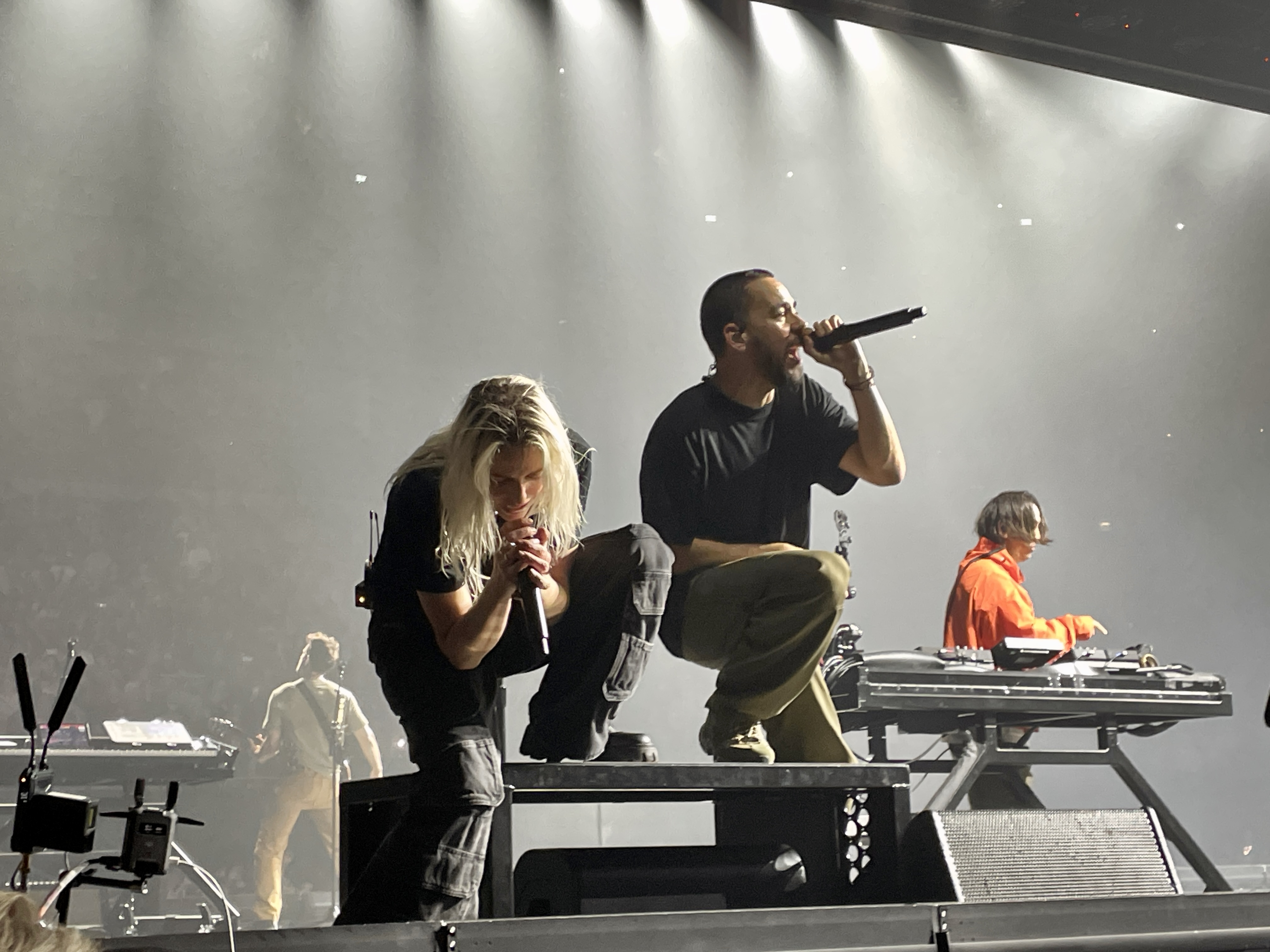
- Linkin Park performing at the O2 Arena in London, England upon their reformation in September 2024.
- As lead artist: 47
- As featured artist: 2
- Promotional singles: 20
- Music videos: 75

The discography of the American rock band Linkin Park consists of 47 singles as a lead artist, 2 singles as a featured artist, 20 promotional singles, and 75 music videos. Linkin Park was formed in Agoura Hills, California, in 1996 by Mike Shinoda (vocals, keyboards, samplers and guitars), Brad Delson (guitar), and Rob Bourdon (drums). Joe Hahn (turntables) and Dave Farrell (bass) were later recruited, and in 1999, Chester Bennington (lead vocals) became a member, performing with the band until his tragic suicide in July 2017. Before Bennington joined the band, Mark Wakefield was their lead singer.

On the US Billboard Hot 100, as of October 2025, the band have three top 10 singles, and fifteen top 40 singles, while having a total of 26 songs to have appeared on the main singles chart in their home country to date. In February 2001, the band's debut single "One Step Closer" from their debut studio album Hybrid Theory (2000) became their first song to enter the Billboard Hot 100. In April 2002, the album's fourth single "In the End" became the band's highest ever charting song, peaking at number two, only being denied the top spot by Jennifer Lopez and Ja Rule's "Ain't It Funny (Murder Remix)". To date, "In the End" is the band's biggest song, becoming their only Diamond certified hit for 10 million units by the Recording Industry Association of America (RIAA).

== Singles ==
=== As lead artist ===
List of singles as lead artist, with selected chart positions and certifications, showing year released and album name
| Title | Year | Peak chart positions | | | | | | | | | | | Certifications | Album |
| Title | Year | US | US Main. | US Rock | AUS | AUT | CAN | FRA | GER | NZ | SWI | UK | Certifications | Album |
|---|---|---|---|---|---|---|---|---|---|---|---|---|---|---|
| "One Step Closer" | 2000 | 75 | 4 | 14 | 4 | 38 | — | — | 32 | — | 42 | 24 | RIAA: Platinum; ARIA: Gold; BPI: Platinum; BVMI: Platinum; RMNZ: 3× Platinum | Hybrid Theory |
| "Crawling" | 2001 | 79 | 3 | 8 | 33 | 8 | 43 | 106 | 14 | 37 | 43 | 16 | RIAA: Gold; BPI: Platinum; BVMI: Platinum; RMNZ: 2× Platinum | Hybrid Theory |
| "Papercut" | 2001 | — | — | 18 | 87 | 43 | — | — | 49 | — | 80 | 14 | RIAA: Gold; BPI: Platinum; BVMI: Gold; RMNZ: 2× Platinum | Hybrid Theory |
| "In the End" | 2001 | 2 | 3 | 3 | 4 | 6 | 2 | 23 | 4 | 10 | 4 | 8 | RIAA: Diamond; ARIA: Gold; BPI: 5× Platinum; BVMI: 3× Platinum; IFPI SWI: Gold; RMNZ: 6× Platinum | Hybrid Theory |
| "Pts.OF.Athrty" (with Jay Gordon) | 2002 | — | — | — (Note: "Pts.Of.Athrty" did not enter the Hot Rock & Alternative Songs chart, but peaked at number 29 on the Alternative Airplay chart.) | 44 | 47 | 47 | — | 31 | — | 61 | 9 | BPI: Silver; RMNZ: Gold | Reanimation |
| "Somewhere I Belong" | 2003 | 32 | 1 | 9 | 13 | 16 | 3 | 32 | 12 | 1 | 15 | 10 | ARIA: Gold; BPI: Platinum; RMNZ: 3× Platinum | Meteora |
| "Faint" | 2003 | 48 | 2 | 15 | 25 | 27 | 27 | 158 | 40 | — | 32 | 15 | RIAA: Platinum; BPI: Platinum; BVMI: Platinum; RMNZ: 3× Platinum | Meteora |
| "Numb" | 2003 | 11 | 1 | 2 | 10 | 8 | 27 | 9 | 13 | 13 | 5 | 14 | RIAA: 4× Platinum; ARIA: Gold; BPI: 4× Platinum; BVMI: 7× Gold; IFPI AUT: Platinum; IFPI SWI: Gold; RMNZ: 6× Platinum | Meteora |
| "From the Inside" | 2004 | — | — | — | 37 | 42 | 43 | 35 | 35 | 50 | 38 | — (Note: "From the Inside" did not enter the UK Singles Chart, but peaked at number 15 on the UK Rock & Metal Singles Chart in the wake of Bennington's death in 2017.) | BPI: Silver; RMNZ: Gold | Meteora |
| "Breaking the Habit" | 2004 | 20 | 1 | 12 | 23 | 43 | 43 | 27 | 25 | 27 | 56 | 39 | RIAA: Gold; BPI: Platinum; BVMI: Platinum; RMNZ: Platinum | Meteora |
| "Numb/Encore" (with Jay-Z) | 2004 | 20 | — | 17 | 3 | 3 | 3 | 5 | 4 | — | 10 | 14 | RIAA: 3× Platinum; ARIA: Platinum; BPI: 4× Platinum; BVMI: 2× Platinum; IFPI AUT: Gold; MC: Gold; RMNZ: 4× Platinum | Collision Course |
| "What I've Done" | 2007 | 7 | 1 | 7 | 13 | 8 | 3 | 107 | 3 | 9 | 6 | 6 | RIAA: 6× Platinum; BPI: 2× Platinum; BVMI: 2× Platinum; MC: Platinum; IFPI SWI: Platinum; RMNZ: 3× Platinum | Minutes to Midnight |
| "Bleed It Out" | 2007 | 52 | 3 | 16 | 24 | 43 | 22 | — | 40 | 7 | 42 | 29 | RIAA: 4× Platinum; BPI: Platinum; BVMI: Platinum; RMNZ: 3× Platinum | Minutes to Midnight |
| "Shadow of the Day" | 2007 | 15 | 6 | 19 | 15 | 6 | 12 | 20 | 12 | 13 | 11 | 46 | RIAA: 2× Platinum; BPI: Silver; BVMI: Gold; IFPI SWI: Gold; RMNZ: Platinum | Minutes to Midnight |
| "Given Up" | 2008 | 99 | 5 | — (Note: "Given Up" did not enter the Hot Rock & Alternative Songs chart, but peaked at number 4 on the Alternative Airplay chart.) | — | — | — | — | 53 | — | — | — (Note: "Given Up" did not enter the UK Singles Chart, but peaked at number 60 on the UK Physical Singles chart.) | RIAA: Platinum; BPI: Gold; RMNZ: Platinum | Minutes to Midnight |
| "Leave Out All the Rest" | 2008 | 94 | 33 | 22 | 24 | 17 | — | 17 | 15 | 38 | 36 | 90 | RIAA: Platinum; BPI: Silver; BVMI: Gold; RMNZ: Gold | Minutes to Midnight |
| "New Divide" | 2009 | 6 | 1 | 1 | 3 | 2 | 3 | — | 4 | 2 | 7 | 19 | RIAA: 3× Platinum; ARIA: Platinum; BPI: Gold; BVMI: 3× Gold; RMNZ: 2× Platinum | Transformers: Revenge of the Fallen – The Album |
| "Not Alone" | 2010 | — | — | — | — | — | — | — | — | — | — | — | | Download to Donate for Haiti |
| "The Catalyst" | 2010 | 27 | 12 | 1 | 33 | 18 | 28 | — | 11 | 27 | 29 | 40 | RIAA: Gold | A Thousand Suns |
| "Waiting for the End" | 2010 | 42 | 37 | 2 | — | 34 | 55 | — | 29 | — | 58 | 90 | RIAA: Platinum; RMNZ: Gold | A Thousand Suns |
| "Burning in the Skies" | 2011 | — | — | — (Note: "Burning in the Skies" did not enter the Hot Rock & Alternative Songs chart, but peaked at number 37 on the Rock Digital Songs chart.) | — | 35 | — | — | 43 | — | 41 | — (Note: "Burning in the Skies" did not enter the UK Singles Chart, but peaked at number 16 on the UK Rock & Metal Singles chart.) | | A Thousand Suns |
| "Iridescent" | 2011 | 81 | — | 29 | 39 | 52 | — | — | 46 | — | 69 | 93 | RIAA: Gold | A Thousand Suns |
| "Burn It Down" | 2012 | 30 | 1 | 1 | 41 | 10 | 33 | 47 | 2 | 13 | 12 | 27 | RIAA: 3× Platinum; BPI: Gold; BVMI: 3× Gold; IFPI AUT: Gold; IFPI SWI: Platinum; RMNZ: Platinum | Living Things |
| "Lost in the Echo" | 2012 | 95 | 7 | 10 | — | — | — | 150 | 68 | — | — | 175 | RIAA: Gold | Living Things |
| "Powerless" | 2012 | — | — | — | — | — | — | — | — | — | — | — (Note: "Powerless" did not enter the UK Singles Chart, but peaked at number 40 on the UK Rock & Metal Singles chart.) | | Living Things |
| "Castle of Glass" | 2013 | — | — | 32 | — | 2 | — | 166 | 10 | — | 17 | — (Note: "Castle of Glass" did not enter the UK Singles Chart, but peaked at number 17 on the UK Rock & Metal Singles chart.) | RIAA: Platinum; BPI: Gold; BVMI: 3× Gold; IFPI AUT: Gold; IFPI SWI: Platinum; RMNZ: Gold | Living Things |
| "A Light That Never Comes" (with Steve Aoki) | 2013 | 65 | — | 11 | 56 | 21 | 51 | 81 | 8 | — | 15 | 34 | | Recharged |
| "Guilty All the Same" (featuring Rakim) | 2014 | — (Note: "Guilty All the Same" did not enter the Billboard Hot 100, but peaked at number 17 on the Bubbling Under Hot 100 Singles chart.) | 1 | 19 | — | 48 | — | 116 | 32 | — | 50 | 138 | | The Hunting Party |
| "Until It's Gone" | 2014 | — (Note: "Until It's Gone" did not enter the Billboard Hot 100, but peaked at number 15 on the Bubbling Under Hot 100 Singles chart.) | 1 | 17 | 58 | 33 | — | 104 | 24 | — | 23 | 78 | | The Hunting Party |
| "Wastelands" | 2014 | — | — | 25 | 64 | — | — (Note: "Wastelands" did not enter the Canadian Billboard Hot 100, but peaked at number 57 on the Hot Canadian Digital Songs Chart.) | 76 | — | — | — | — (Note: "Wastelands" did not enter the UK Singles Chart, but peaked at number 7 on the UK Rock & Metal Singles chart.) | | The Hunting Party |
| "Rebellion" (featuring Daron Malakian) | 2014 | — | 15 | 21 | — | — | — (Note: "Rebellion" did not enter the Canadian Billboard Hot 100, but peaked at number 55 on the Hot Canadian Digital Songs Chart.) | 83 | — | — | — | — (Note: "Rebellion" did not enter the UK Singles Chart, but peaked at number 13 on the UK Rock & Metal Singles chart.) | | The Hunting Party |
| "Final Masquerade" | 2014 | — (Note: "Final Masquerade" did not enter the Billboard Hot 100, but peaked at number 15 on the Bubbling Under Hot 100 Singles chart.) | 35 | 18 | 43 | 65 | 85 | 45 | 70 | 30 | 64 | 106 | | The Hunting Party |
| "Heavy" (featuring Kiiara) | 2017 | 45 | — | 2 | 33 | 9 | 46 | 111 | 12 | 35 | 8 | 43 | RIAA: 2× Platinum; ARIA: Gold; BPI: Silver; BVMI: Gold; IFPI SWI: Gold; RMNZ: Platinum | One More Light |
| "Talking to Myself" | 2017 | — (Note: "Talking to Myself" did not enter the Billboard Hot 100, but peaked at number 9 on the Bubbling Under Hot 100 Singles chart.) | — | 13 | — | 52 | 66 | 180 | 73 | — | 35 | — (Note: "Talking to Myself" did not enter the UK Singles Chart, but peaked at number 50 on the Official Audio Streaming Chart.) | | One More Light |
| "One More Light" | 2017 | — (Note: "One More Light" did not enter the Billboard Hot 100, but peaked at number 4 on the Bubbling Under Hot 100 Singles chart.) | — | 6 | 85 | 35 | 91 | 113 | 51 | — | 48 | — (Note: "One More Light" did not enter the UK Singles Chart, but peaked at number 53 on the UK Singles Sales Chart.) | RIAA: Platinum; BPI: Platinum; BVMI: Gold; RMNZ: Platinum; SNEP: Platinum | One More Light |
| "She Couldn't" | 2020 | — | — | 47 | — | — | — | — | — | — | — | — | | Hybrid Theory (20th Anniversary Edition) |
| "Lost" | 2023 | 38 | 1 | 4 | 49 | 9 | 28 | 143 | 5 | — (Note: "Lost" did not enter the NZ Top 40 Singles Chart, but peaked at number 2 on the NZ Hot Singles Chart.) | 16 | 18 | BPI: Silver; BVMI: Gold; RMNZ: Gold; SNEP: Platinum | Meteora20 |
| "Fighting Myself" | 2023 | — (Note: "Fighting Myself" did not enter the Billboard Hot 100, but peaked at number 22 on the Bubbling Under Hot 100 Singles chart.) | — | 14 | — (Note: "Fighting Myself" did not enter the ARIA Singles Chart, but peaked at number 23 on the Australia Digital Tracks Chart.) | 60 | — (Note: "Fighting Myself" did not enter the Canadian Billboard Hot 100, but peaked at number 11 on the Hot Canadian Digital Songs Chart.) | — | 41 | — (Note: "Fighting Myself" did not enter the NZ Top 40 Singles Chart, but peaked at number 7 on the NZ Hot Singles Chart.) | 72 | 81 | | Meteora20 |
| "Friendly Fire" | 2024 | — (Note: "Friendly Fire" did not enter the Billboard Hot 100, but peaked at number 2 on the Bubbling Under Hot 100 chart.) | 1 | 13 | — (Note: "Friendly Fire" did not enter the ARIA Singles Chart, but peaked at number 39 on the Australia Digital Tracks Chart.) | 62 | — (Note: "Friendly Fire" did not enter the Canadian Billboard Hot 100, but peaked at number 20 on the Canada Rock chart.) | 197 | 40 | — (Note: "Friendly Fire" did not enter the NZ Top 40 Singles Chart, but peaked at number 11 on the NZ Hot Singles Chart.) | 60 | — (Note: "Friendly Fire" did not enter the UK Singles Chart, but peaked at number 31 on the UK Singles Sales Chart.) | SNEP: Gold | Papercuts (Singles Collection 2000–2023) |
| "Qwerty" | 2024 | — | — | — (Note: "Qwerty" did not enter the US Hot Rock & Alternative Songs chart, but peaked at number 5 on the US Hot Hard Rock Songs chart.) | — | — | — | — | — | — | — | — | | Papercuts (Singles Collection 2000–2023) |
| "The Emptiness Machine" | 2024 | 21 | 1 | 3 | 27 | 1 | 12 | 12 | 1 | 18 | 1 | 4 | ARIA: Platinum; BPI: Platinum; BVMI: 3× Gold; IFPI AUT: Platinum; IFPI SWI: Platinum; MC: 2× Platinum; RMNZ: Platinum; SNEP: Diamond | From Zero |
| "Heavy Is the Crown" | 2024 | 79 | 1 | 12 | 68 | 2 | 40 | 33 | 3 | — (Note: "Heavy Is the Crown" did not enter the NZ Top 40 Singles Chart, but peaked at number 6 on the NZ Hot Singles Chart.) | 3 | 18 | ARIA: Gold; BPI: Silver; BVMI: Gold; IFPI AUT: Gold; MC: Gold; RMNZ: Gold; SNEP: Gold | From Zero |
| "Over Each Other" | 2024 | — | — | 22 | — (Note: "Over Each Other" did not enter the ARIA Singles Chart, but peaked at number 24 on the Australia Digital Tracks Chart.) | 9 | 86 | 67 | 11 | — (Note: "Over Each Other" did not enter the NZ Top 40 Singles Chart, but peaked at number 14 on the NZ Hot Singles Chart.) | 15 | 57 | | From Zero |
| "Two Faced" | 2024 | — (Note: "Two Faced" did not enter the Billboard Hot 100, but peaked at number 7 on the Bubbling Under Hot 100 chart.) | — | 14 | — (Note: "Two Faced" did not enter the ARIA Singles Chart, but peaked at number 49 on the Australia Digital Tracks Chart.) | 7 | 57 | 49 | 5 | — (Note: "Two Faced" did not enter the NZ Top 40 Singles Chart, but peaked at number 4 on the NZ Hot Singles Chart.) | 6 | 22 | SNEP: Gold | From Zero |
| "Up from the Bottom" | 2025 | — (Note: "Up from the Bottom" did not enter the Billboard Hot 100, but peaked at number 5 on the Bubbling Under Hot 100 chart.) | 1 | 15 | — (Note: "Up from the Bottom" did not enter the ARIA Singles Chart, but peaked at number 21 on the Australia Digital Tracks Chart.) | 7 | 65 | 80 | 6 | — (Note: "Up from the Bottom" did not enter the NZ Top 40 Singles Chart, but peaked at number 7 on the NZ Hot Singles Chart.) | 13 | 42 | SNEP: Gold | From Zero (Deluxe Edition) |
| "Unshatter" | 2025 | — | — | 38 | — (Note: "Unshatter" did not enter the ARIA Singles Chart, but peaked at number 27 on the Australia Digital Tracks Chart.) | 61 | — | — | 63 | — (Note: "Unshatter" did not enter the NZ Top 40 Singles Chart, but peaked at number 9 on the NZ Hot Singles Chart.) | 88 | — (Note: "Unshatter" did not enter the UK Singles Chart, but peaked at number 27 on the UK Singles Sales Chart.) | | From Zero (Deluxe Edition) |
"—" denotes a recording that did not chart or was not released in that territory.

=== As featured artist ===
List of singles as featured artist, with selected chart positions, showing year released and album name
| Title | Year | Peak chart positions | | | | | | | | | | Certifications | Album |
| Title | Year | US | AUS | AUT | GER | IRL | NOR | NZ | SWE | SWI | UK | Certifications | Album |
|---|---|---|---|---|---|---|---|---|---|---|---|---|---|
| "We Made It" (Busta Rhymes featuring Linkin Park) | 2008 | 65 | 37 | 16 | 11 | 11 | 11 | 12 | 24 | 17 | 10 | BPI: Silver | Non-album single |
| "Darker Than Blood" (Steve Aoki featuring Linkin Park) | 2015 | — | — | — | — | — | — | — | — | — | — | | Neon Future II |
"—" denotes a recording that did not chart or was not released in that territory.

=== Promotional singles ===
List of promotional singles, with selected chart positions, showing year released and album name
| Title | Year | Peak chart positions | | | | | | | | | | | Certifications | Album |
| Title | Year | US | US Main. | US Rock | AUT | CZ | FRA | GER | POR | SCO | SWI | UK | Certifications | Album |
|---|---|---|---|---|---|---|---|---|---|---|---|---|---|---|
| "Enth E Nd" (with KutMasta Kurt; featuring Motion Man) | 2002 | — | — | — | — | — | — | — | — | — | — | — | | Reanimation |
| "My<Dsmbr" (with Mickey P.; featuring Kelli Ali) | 2002 | — | — | — | — | — | — | — | — | — | — | — | | Reanimation |
| "H! Vltg3" (with Evidence; featuring Pharoahe Monch and DJ Babu) | 2002 | — | — | — | — | — | — | — | — | — | — | — | | Reanimation |
| "Lying from You" | 2004 | 58 | 2 | — (Note: "Lying from You" did not enter the Hot Rock & Alternative Songs chart, but peaked at number one on the Alternative Airplay chart.) | — | — | — | — | — | — | — | — | BPI: Silver; RMNZ: Platinum | Meteora |
| "No More Sorrow" (live) | 2008 | — | — | — | — | — | — | — | — | — | — | — | | Minutes to Midnight |
| "Wretches and Kings" | 2010 | — | — | — | — | — | — | — | — | — | — | — | | A Thousand Suns |
| "Blackout" | 2010 | — | — | — | — | — | — | — | — | — | — | — | | A Thousand Suns |
| "Rolling in the Deep" (live) | 2011 | — | — | — | — | — | — | — | 33 | 48 | — | 42 | | iTunes Festival: London 2011 |
| "Lies Greed Misery" | 2012 | — | — | — | — | — | — | — | — | — | — | — | | Living Things |
| "Final Masquerade" (acoustic) | 2015 | — | — | — | — | — | — | — | — | — | — | — | | Non-album singles |
| "A Line in the Sand" (live) | 2015 | — | — | — | — | — | — | — | — | — | — | — | | Non-album singles |
| "Battle Symphony" | 2017 | — | — | 11 | — | 83 | — | 95 | 71 | — | 90 | — (Note: "Battle Symphony" did not enter the UK Singles Chart, but peaked at number 83 on the UK Singles Sales chart.) | | One More Light |
| "Heavy" (featuring Kiiara) (Nicky Romero Remix) | 2017 | — | — | — | — | — | — | — | — | — | — | — | | Non-album single |
| "Good Goodbye" (featuring Pusha T and Stormzy) | 2017 | — | — | 15 | 69 | 15 | 173 | 65 | 70 | 59 | 49 | — (Note: "Good Goodbye" did not enter the UK Singles Chart, but peaked at number 61 on the UK Singles Sales chart.) | BPI: Silver | One More Light |
| "Heavy" (featuring Kiiara) (Disero Remix) | 2017 | — | — | — | — | — | — | — | — | — | — | — | | Non-album single |
| "Invisible" | 2017 | — | — | 32 | — | 66 | — | — | — | 90 | — | — (Note: "Invisible" did not enter the UK Singles Chart, but peaked at number 100 on the UK Singles Sales chart.) | | One More Light |
| "Darker Than the Light That Never Bleeds" (with Steve Aoki) | 2017 | — | — | — | — | — | — | — | — | — | — | — | | Non-album singles |
| "One More Light" (Steve Aoki Remix) | 2017 | — | — | — | — | — | — | — | — | — | — | — | | Non-album singles |
| "Sharp Edges" | 2017 | — | — | — (Note: "Sharp Edges" did not enter the Hot Rock & Alternative Songs chart, but peaked at number 31 on the Alternative Airplay chart.) | — | — | — | — | — | — | — | — | | One More Light |
"—" denotes a recording that did not chart or was not released in that territory.

== Other charted and certified songs ==
List of other charted songs, with selected chart positions, showing year released, album name and certifications
| Title | Year | Peak chart positions | | | | | | | | | | Certifications | Album |
| Title | Year | US | US Main. | US Hard Rock | US Rock | FRA | GER | NZ Hot | UK | UK Rock | WW | Certifications | Album |
|---|---|---|---|---|---|---|---|---|---|---|---|---|---|
| "Runaway" | 2000 | — | 37 | — | — | — | — | — | — | 10 | — | BPI: Silver; RMNZ: Gold | Hybrid Theory |
| "With You" | 2000 | — | — | — | — | — | — | — | — | — | — | RMNZ: Gold | Hybrid Theory |
| "Don't Stay" | 2003 | — | — | — | — | — | — | — | — | — | — | BPI: Silver; RMNZ: Gold | Meteora |
| "Figure.09" | 2003 | — | — | — | — | — | — | — | — | — | — | BPI: Silver; RMNZ: Gold | Meteora |
| "Dirt off Your Shoulder/Lying from You" (with Jay-Z) | 2004 | — | — | — | — | — | — | — | 150 | — (Note: "Dirt off Your Shoulder/Lying from You" did not enter the UK Rock & Metal Singles Chart, but peaked at number 39 on the UK Hip Hop and R&B Singles Chart.) | — | BPI: Gold | Collision Course |
| "Hands Held High" | 2007 | 123 | — | — | — | — | — | — | — | — | — | | Minutes to Midnight |
| "No More Sorrow" | 2007 | 124 | — | — | — | — | — | — | — | — | — | | Minutes to Midnight |
| "Blackbirds" | 2010 | — | — | — | — | — | — | — | — | 21 | — | | 8-Bit Rebellion! |
| "In My Remains" | 2012 | — | — | — | — | 151 | 83 | — | — | 10 | — | | Living Things |
| "I'll Be Gone" | 2012 | — | — | — | — | — | — | — | — | 26 | — | | Living Things |
| "Keys to the Kingdom" | 2014 | — | — | — | — | — | — | — | — | 33 | — | | The Hunting Party |
| "All for Nothing" (featuring Page Hamilton) | 2014 | — | — | — | — | — | — | — | — | 23 | — | | The Hunting Party |
| "Nobody Can Save Me" | 2017 | — | — | — | 37 | — | — | — | — | — | — | | One More Light |
| "Sorry for Now" | 2017 | — | — | — | 41 | — | — | — | — | — | — | | One More Light |
| "Halfway Right" | 2017 | — | — | — | 46 | — | — | — | — | — | — | | One More Light |
| "A Place for My Head" | 2017 | — | — | — | — | — | — | — | — | 11 | — | BPI: Silver; RMNZ: Gold | Hybrid Theory |
| "By Myself" | 2017 | — | — | — | — | — | — | — | — | 19 | — | | Hybrid Theory |
| "Pushing Me Away" | 2017 | — | — | — | — | — | — | — | — | 23 | — | | Hybrid Theory |
| "Forgotten" | 2017 | — | — | — | — | — | — | — | — | 24 | — | | Hybrid Theory |
| "My December" | 2017 | — | — | — | — | — | — | — | — | 30 | — | | Hybrid Theory |
| "Cure for the Itch" | 2017 | — | — | — | — | — | — | — | — | 33 | — | | Hybrid Theory |
| "Don't Stay" | 2017 | — | — | — | — | — | — | — | — | 27 | — | RMNZ: Gold | Meteora |
| "More the Victim" | 2023 | — (Note: "More the Victim" did not enter the US Billboard Hot 100, but peaked at number 27 on the US Digital Song Sales Chart.) | — | 11 | — | — | — | — | — (Note: "More the Victim" did not enter the UK Singles Chart, but peaked at number 32 on the UK Singles Sales Chart.) | — | — | | Meteora20 |
| "Massive" | 2023 | — (Note: "Massive" did not enter the US Billboard Hot 100, but peaked at number 50 on the US Digital Song Sales Chart.) | — | — | — | — | — | — | — (Note: "Massive" did not enter the UK Singles Chart, but peaked at number 55 on the UK Singles Sales Chart.) | — | — | | Meteora20 |
| "Healing Foot" | 2023 | — (Note: "Healing Foot" did not enter the US Billboard Hot 100, but peaked at number 33 on the US Digital Song Sales Chart.) | — | — | — | — | — | — | — (Note: "Healing Foot" did not enter the UK Singles Chart, but peaked at number 45 on the UK Singles Sales Chart.) | — | — | | Meteora20 |
| "Resolution" | 2023 | — | — | — | — | — | — | — | — (Note: "Resolution" did not enter the UK Singles Chart, but peaked at number 75 on the UK Singles Sales Chart.) | — | — | | Meteora20 |
| "Cut the Bridge" | 2024 | — | — | 5 | 24 | — | — | 5 | — (Note: "Cut the Bridge" did not enter the UK Singles Chart, but peaked at number 97 on the UK Official Streaming Chart.) | 15 | 80 | | From Zero |
| "Casualty" | 2024 | — | — | 9 | 31 | — | — | — | — | 26 | 138 | | From Zero |
| "Overflow" | 2024 | — | — | 8 | 30 | — | — | — | — | 29 | 136 | | From Zero |
| "Stained" | 2024 | — | — | 6 | 28 | — | — | 9 | — | 19 | 118 | | From Zero |
| "IGYEIH" | 2024 | — | — | 10 | 33 | — | — | — | — | 32 | 150 | | From Zero |
| "Good Things Go" | 2024 | — | — | 7 | 29 | — | — | — | — | 25 | 127 | | From Zero |
| "Let You Fade" | 2025 | — | — | 10 | 43 | — | 100 | — | — (Note: "Let You Fade" did not enter the UK Singles Chart, but peaked at number 30 on the UK Singles Sales Chart.) | 33 | — | | From Zero (Deluxe Edition) |
"—" denotes a recording that did not chart or was not released in that territory.

== Other appearances ==
| Title | Year | Album | Label | Ref(s) |
|---|---|---|---|---|
| "Closing" (Xero) | 1998 | Rapology 12 | The Urban Network | |
| "Drop" (Kenji & Artofficial of Xero) | 1998 | Rapology 13 | The Urban Network | |
| "Fiends CD RAP UP" (Xero featuring 007) | 1998 | Rapology 14 | The Urban Network | |
| "Rhinestone" (Xero) | 1999 | New Music Sampler 1999 | Zomba | |
| "My December" | 2000 | The Real Slim Santa | KROQ | |
| "One Step Closer" (Early Mix) | 2001 | ECW Extreme Music Volume 2: Anarchy Rocks | V2 | |
| "With You" (Live) | 2001 | Ozzfest 2001: The Second Millennium | Sony | |
| "Runaway" (Live) | 2002 | The Family Values Tour 2001 | Elektra WEA | |
| "One Step Closer" (Live) (featuring Aaron Lewis) | 2002 | The Family Values Tour 2001 | Elektra WEA | |
| "It's Goin' Down" (The X-Ecutioners featuring Mike Shinoda and Mr. Hahn) | 2002 | Built from Scratch | Loud Records Sony BMG | |
| "My December" (Live) | 2003 | The Year They Recalled Santa Claus | KROQ | |
| "Nobody's Listening" (Green Lantern Remix) | 2005 | Fort Minor: We Major | Machine Shop Recordings | |
| "Bleed It Out" (Live) | 2007 | Live Earth: The Concerts for a Climate in Crisis | Warner Bros. Records | |
| "Blackout" (Early Mix) | 2010 | FIFA 11 | EA Sports | |
| "Issho Ni" | 2011 | Download to Donate: Tsunami Relief | Machine Shop; Warner Bros. | |
| "Iridescent" (Radio Edit) | 2011 | Transformers: Dark of the Moon – The Album | Reprise Records | |
| "Blackout" (Renholdër Remix) | 2012 | Underworld: Awakening | Lakeshore | |
| "Wretches" (Remix) (Apathy featuring Linkin Park, Ryu, Scoop DeVille and Divine Styler) | 2012 | It's the Bootleg, Muthafuckas! Volume 3: Fire Walk with Me | Demigodz | |
| "All for Nothing" (Radio Edit) (featuring Page Hamilton) | 2014 | Pro Evolution Soccer 2015 | Konami | |
| "Things in My Jeep" (The Lonely Island featuring Linkin Park) | 2016 | Popstar: Never Stop Never Stopping | Universal Republic | |
| "Battle Symphony" | 2017 | Pro Evolution Soccer 2018 | Konami | |
| "Heavy Is the Crown" | 2024 | 2024 League of Legends World Championship | Riot Games | |

== Music videos ==
=== Traditional videos ===
| Year | Details | Director(s) | Album | Type | Link |
|---|---|---|---|---|---|
| 2000 | "One Step Closer" | Gregory Dark | Hybrid Theory | Performance | |
| 2001 | "Crawling" | Brothers Strause | Hybrid Theory | Performance | |
| 2001 | "Papercut" | Nathan "Karma" Cox and Joe Hahn | Hybrid Theory | Performance | |
| 2001 | "In the End" | Nathan "Karma" Cox and Joe Hahn | Hybrid Theory | Surrealist | |
| 2001 | "Points of Authority" | Nathan "Karma" Cox | Hybrid Theory | Live, studio footage | |
| 2001 | "Cure for the Itch" | Joe Hahn | Hybrid Theory | Animation | |
| 2002 | "Opening" | Joe Hahn | Reanimation | Narrative | |
| 2002 | "Pts.OF.Athrty" (MTV Version) | Nathan "Karma" Cox | Reanimation | Narrative | |
| 2002 | "Enth E Nd" | Jason Goldwatch | Reanimation | Performance | |
| 2002 | "[Chali]" | Joe Hahn | Reanimation | Narrative | |
| 2002 | "FRGT/10" | Joshua Cordes | Reanimation | Animation, narrative | |
| 2002 | "P5hng Me A*wy" | Scott Patton | Reanimation | Narrative | |
| 2002 | "Plc.4 Mie Hæd" | Shawn M. Foster | Reanimation | Narrative | |
| 2002 | "X-Ecutioner Style" | David Zager | Reanimation | Animation | |
| 2002 | "H! Vltg3" | Estevan Oriol | Reanimation | Narrative | |
| 2002 | "[Riff Raff]" | Joe Hahn | Reanimation | Narrative | |
| 2002 | "Wth>You" | Ryan Thompson | Reanimation | Performance | |
| 2002 | "Ntr\Mssn" | Joe Hahn | Reanimation | Narrative | |
| 2002 | "Ppr:Kut" | Mike Piscatelli | Reanimation | Footage | |
| 2002 | "Rnw@y" | Kimo Proudfoot | Reanimation | Narrative | |
| 2002 | "My<Dsmbr" | Chip Miller | Reanimation | Narrative | |
| 2002 | "[Stef]" | Joe Hahn | Reanimation | Narrative | |
| 2002 | "By_Myslf" | Matt Bass | Reanimation | Narrative | |
| 2002 | "Kyur4 Th Ich" | Joe Hahn | Reanimation | Footage | |
| 2002 | "1Stp Klosr" | Shaun Smith | Reanimation | Narrative | |
| 2002 | "KRWLNG" | Jonathan Ruppel | Reanimation | Animation | |
| 2002 | "Pts.OF.Athrty" (Animated Version) | Joe Hahn | Reanimation | Animation | |
| 2003 | "Somewhere I Belong" | Joe Hahn | Meteora | Performance | |
| 2003 | "Faint" | Mark Romanek | Meteora | Performance | |
| 2003 | "Numb" | Joe Hahn | Meteora | Narrative | |
| 2004 | "From the Inside" | Joe Hahn | Meteora | Narrative | |
| 2004 | "Breaking the Habit" (Animated Version) | Joe Hahn | Meteora | Animation, n | |
| 2004 | "Breaking the Habit" (5.28.04, 3:37 P.M. Version) | Kimo Proudfoot | Meteora | Studio footage | |
| 2004 | "Lying from You" | Kimo Proudfoot | Meteora | Live footage | |
| 2004 | "Numb/Encore" | Joe DeMaio and Kimo Proudfoot | Collision Course | Narrative, live footage | |
| 2007 | "What I've Done" | Joe Hahn | Minutes to Midnight | Performance | |
| 2007 | "Bleed It Out" | Joe Hahn | Minutes to Midnight | Performance | |
| 2007 | "Shadow of the Day" | Joe Hahn | Minutes to Midnight | Narrative | |
| 2008 | "Given Up" | Mark Fiore and Linkin Park | Minutes to Midnight | Performance | |
| 2008 | "We Made It" (Busta Rhymes featuring Linkin Park) | Chris Robinson | Non-album single | Performance | |
| 2008 | "Leave Out All the Rest" | Joe Hahn | Minutes to Midnight | Narrative | |
| 2009 | "New Divide" | Joe Hahn | Transformers: Revenge of the Fallen – The Album | Performance | |
| 2010 | "Not Alone" | Bill Boyd | Download to Donate for Haiti | Footage | |
| 2010 | "Blackbirds" | —N/a | 8-Bit Rebellion! | Montage | |
| 2010 | "The Catalyst" | Joe Hahn | A Thousand Suns | Narrative | |
| 2010 | "Waiting for the End" | Joe Hahn | A Thousand Suns | Performance | |
| 2011 | "Burning in the Skies" | Joe Hahn | A Thousand Suns | Narrative | |
| 2011 | "Iridescent" (Transformers version) | Joe Hahn | A Thousand Suns | Narrative | |
| 2012 | "Burn It Down" | Joe Hahn | Living Things | Performance | |
| 2012 | "Powerless" | Timur Bekmambetov | Living Things | Performance | |
| 2012 | "Lost in the Echo" | Jason Zada and Jason Nickel | Living Things | Narrative | |
| 2012 | "Castle of Glass" | Drew Stauffer and Jerry O'Flaherty | Living Things | Narrative | |
| 2013 | "A Light That Never Comes" | Joe Hahn | Recharged | Animation | |
| 2014 | "A Light That Never Comes (Vicetone Remix)" | Vicetone | A Light That Never Comes (Remixes) | Animation | |
| 2014 | "A Light That Never Comes (Coone Remix)" | Editz.nl | A Light That Never Comes (Remixes) | Performance | |
| 2014 | "Guilty All the Same" | Project Spark | The Hunting Party | Gameplay | |
| 2014 | "Until It's Gone" | Joe Hahn | The Hunting Party | Narrative | |
| 2014 | "Wastelands" | —N/a | The Hunting Party | Performance | |
| 2014 | "Final Masquerade" | Mark Pellington | The Hunting Party | Narrative | |
| 2014 | "Iridescent" (Stars of the Season version) | David Kinsler | A Thousand Suns | Narrative | |
| 2014 | "White Noise" | Joe Hahn | Mall | Excerpt | |
| 2015 | "Devil's Drop" | Joe Hahn | Mall | Excerpt | |
| 2015 | "The Last Line" | Joe Hahn | Mall | Excerpt | |
| 2015 | "Darker Than Blood" | Dan Packer | Neon Future II | Narrative | |
| 2017 | "Heavy" | Tim Mattia | One More Light | Narrative | |
| 2017 | "Good Goodbye" | Isaac Rentz | One More Light | Narrative | |
| 2017 | "Talking to Myself" | Mark Fiore | One More Light | Live footage | |
| 2017 | "One More Light" | Joe Hahn and Mark Fiore | One More Light | Live footage | |
| 2023 | "Lost" | Maciej Kuciara and pplpleasr | Meteora 20th Anniversary Edition | Narrative, performance | |
| 2024 | "Friendly Fire" | Mark Fiore | Papercuts | Footage, performance | |
| 2024 | "The Emptiness Machine" | Joe Hahn | From Zero | Narrative, performance | |
| 2024 | "Heavy Is the Crown" | Eddy.tv | From Zero | Narrative, performance, animated | |
| 2024 | "Over Each Other" | Joe Hahn | From Zero | Narrative | |
| 2024 | "Two Faced" | Joe Hahn | From Zero | Performance | |
| 2025 | "Up From the Bottom" | Joe Hahn | From Zero (Deluxe Edition) | Performance | |

=== Lyric videos ===
| Year | Song | Album | Type | Link |
|---|---|---|---|---|
| 2010 | "The Catalyst" | A Thousand Suns | Static and chaotic imagery | |
| 2010 | "Waiting for the End" | A Thousand Suns | Static and chaotic imagery | |
| 2010 | "Blackout" | A Thousand Suns | Static and chaotic imagery | |
| 2010 | "Burning in the Skies" | A Thousand Suns | Static and chaotic imagery | |
| 2012 | "Burn It Down" | Living Things | Rotating Living Things art | |
| 2012 | "Lies Greed Misery" | Living Things | Rotating Living Things art | |
| 2012 | "Lost in the Echo" | Living Things | Rotating Living Things art | |
| 2013 | "A Light That Never Comes" | Recharged | Rotating Recharged art | |
| 2014 | "Guilty All the Same" | The Hunting Party | Cloud animation | |
| 2014 | "Until It's Gone" | The Hunting Party | Narrative film clip | |
| 2014 | "Wastelands" | The Hunting Party | White text on black background | |
| 2014 | "Rebellion" | The Hunting Party | White text on black background | |
| 2014 | "Final Masquerade" | The Hunting Party | White text on black background | |
| 2015 | "Darker Than Blood" | Neon Future II | Moving shape animations | |
| 2016 | "In the End" | Hybrid Theory | White text on black background | |
| 2017 | "Heavy" | One More Light | Chester and Kiiara animation | |
| 2017 | "Battle Symphony" | One More Light | Narrative film clip | |
| 2017 | "Good Goodbye" | One More Light | Stock footage and animations | |
| 2017 | "Invisible" | One More Light | Photography of various scenery and people | |
| 2017 | "One More Light" | One More Light | Compilation of fan lyric videos | |
| 2017 | "Talking to Myself" | One More Light | Performance stills of the band | |
