= Carnivores Tour =

2014 concert tour by Linkin Park and Thirty Seconds to Mars

- Promotional tour by Linkin Park and Thirty Seconds to Mars
- Promotional poster for tour
- Location: North America
- Associated albums: The Hunting Party; Love, Lust, Faith and Dreams
- Start date: August 8, 2014
- End date: September 19, 2014
- Legs: 1
- No. of shows: 25
- Supporting act: AFI
Linkin Park tour chronology
- Living Things World Tour
- (2012–2013)
- Carnivores Tour
- (2014)
- The Hunting Party Tour
- (2014–2015)
Thirty Seconds to Mars tour chronology
- Love, Lust, Faith and Dreams Tour
- (2013–2015)
- Carnivores Tour
- (2014)
- Monolith Tour
- (2018–2019)

The Carnivores Tour was a co-headlining concert tour by the American rock bands Linkin Park and Thirty Seconds to Mars. It was launched in support of Linkin Park's sixth studio album The Hunting Party (2014) and Thirty Seconds to Mars' fourth studio album Love, Lust, Faith and Dreams (2013). The joint tour was officially announced in March 2014 at a press conference, with the full itinerary being revealed. It began on August 8, 2014 in West Palm Beach, Florida and ended on September 19 in Concord, California, visiting arenas and stadiums throughout North America. It was promoted by Live Nation and sponsored in-part by Infinity. American rock band AFI served as the opening act for the tour.

During the concert tour, Linkin Park and Thirty Seconds to Mars promoted greener touring practices and worked with Music for Relief, a non-profit organization to support disaster relief and programs to protect the environment. The Carnivores Tour received general critical acclaim, with critics praising both artists' performance abilities and the production of the show. The concert at the Hollywood Bowl in Los Angeles, California, was filmed and streamed live over the interactive social platform VyRT.

== Background ==
Rumours of a co-headlining tour from Linkin Park and Thirty Seconds to Mars first circulated on March 3, 2014, when a Texas radio station revealed that the two "modern rock icons" would be partaking in a tour starting in late summer and that a performance in The Woodlands would take place on September 5. The tour was officially announced the following day, on March 4, 2014 at a press conference held at Milk Studios in Los Angeles, California with Mike Shinoda and Chester Bennington from Linkin Park, and Jared Leto from Thirty Seconds to Mars. The conference was broadcast on the internet through the interactive social platform VyRT. In an interview with Billboard, Bennington explained that a co-headlining tour with Thirty Seconds to Mars had been a long time coming; Linkin Park, indeed, had polled their fans a number of times in order to identify which artist they would like to join them on tour and Thirty Seconds to Mars was the most sought-after band multiple times. Thirty Seconds to Mars first worked with Linkin Park in 2007, opening some European shows for the band.

Set for August 2014, the Carnivores Tour showcased Linkin Park's sixth studio album The Hunting Party (2014) and Thirty Seconds to Mars' fourth studio album Love, Lust, Faith and Dreams (2013). Speaking on the tour name, Shinoda said, "'Carnivores' is a metaphor that is meant to convey an appetite for something visceral and substantive. I feel that's exactly the hunger this tour will feed." Leto added, "We are so excited to join our friends on this epic journey. It's going to be the adventure of a lifetime." American rock band AFI was confirmed as the supporting act for the tour, promoting their ninth album Burials (2013). The Carnivores Tour was sponsored in-part by Infinity and promoted by Live Nation.

== Development ==
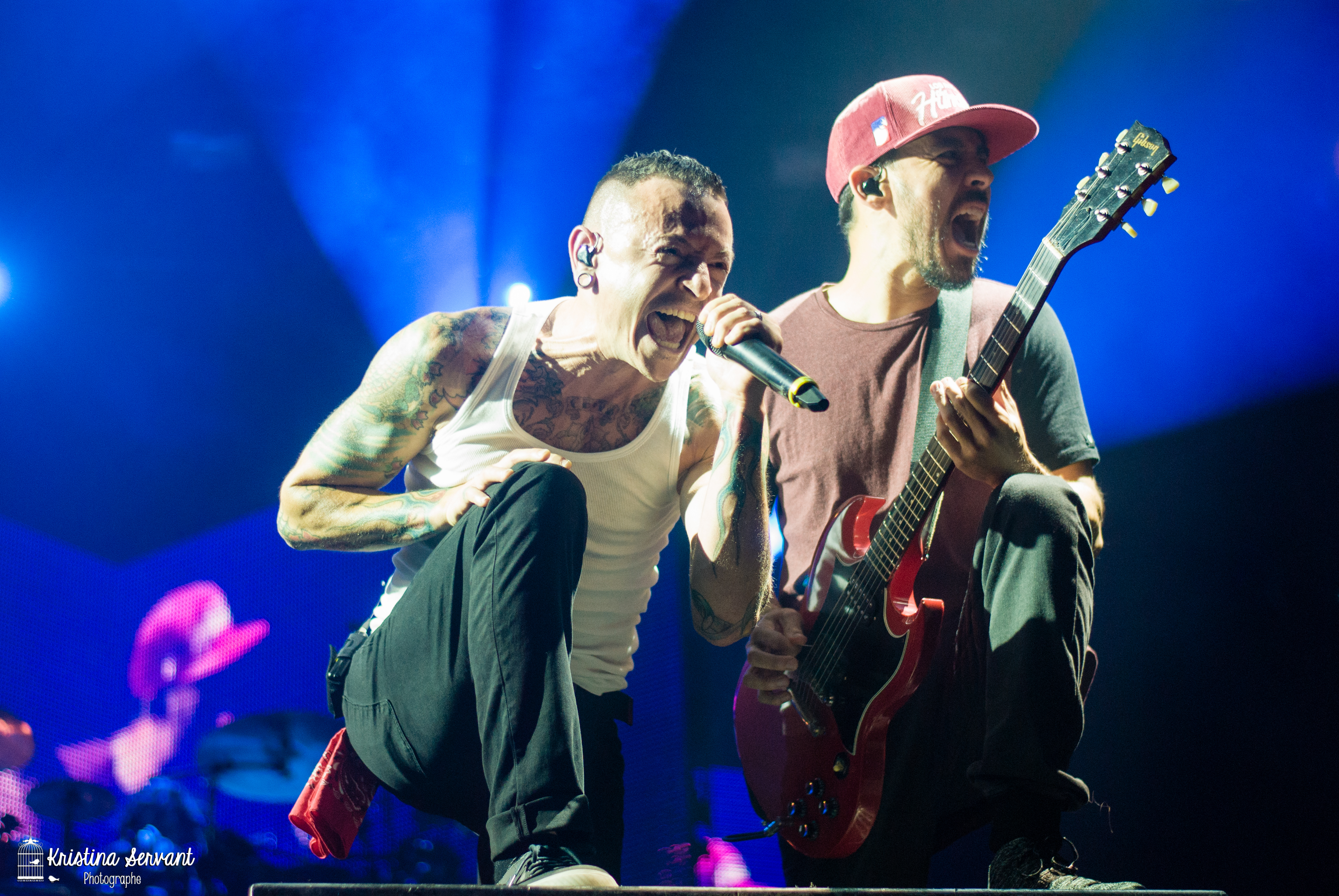
Linkin Park performing in August 2014

Sales for general tickets began on March 7, 2014, with Hollywood Bowl and Verizon Wireless Amphitheater on sale March 10. Linkin Park and Thirty Seconds to Mars offered pre-sale tickets for their respective fan club members. Linkin Park's set list mixed The Hunting Party with the rest of the band's catalog. The set by Thirty Seconds to Mars encompassed songs from Love, Lust, Faith and Dreams, as well as tracks from their previous albums. Supporting act AFI did not perform on September 15 in Los Angeles. Mike Shinoda described the tour production as "more-video based", incorporating The Hunting Party artwork created by visual artist James Jean. He explained:

"It adapts with the show, I think in the context of a live show it's important to have something that lives and breathes with the show. One of the challenges that I posed to the production team was ... if we decided to play something different, if we decided to extend a part, whatever we decide to do, I want the artwork to change with the performance. So it needs to be malleable ... It's as much a piece of art as the music is, so we want it to be compelling and fit with the overall kind of aesthetic of what the band is up to right at this moment."

A minute-long trailer for the tour premiered in March 2014, featuring a British narrator and assorted live scenes, paired with some of the bands' songs, including "Numb" by Linkin Park and "The Kill" by Thirty Seconds to Mars. The promotional poster for the tour featured the three groups' logos with a background based on The Hunting Party artwork.

== Philanthropy ==
A category of ticket packages was created to be sold by an auction process at prices estimated at up to $1,000. All proceeds were donated to Music for Relief, a non-profit organization founded by Linkin Park to support disaster relief and programs to protect and restore the environment. Additionally, one dollar per concert ticket sold was contributed to the charity. A tent of Music for Relief was staffed by local volunteers at each concert. The tent featured a photo booth which enabled fans to document their concert experience and express their support to take action on climate change, leading up to the United Nations Climate Summit that took place on September 23, 2014 in New York City. Various clean energy tools were also showcased.

Determined to offset the impact that the tour would have on the environment, Music for Relief and environmental non-profit Rewerb promoted greener touring practices such as recycling throughout the venue, free water stations for refillable bottles, reusable products and carpooling incentives. Touring vehicles were powered by low-emissions renewable biodiesel, a fuel made partly from vegetable oil. Non-profit organizations Love Hope Strength and HeadCount joined the tour for select dates.

== Critical response ==
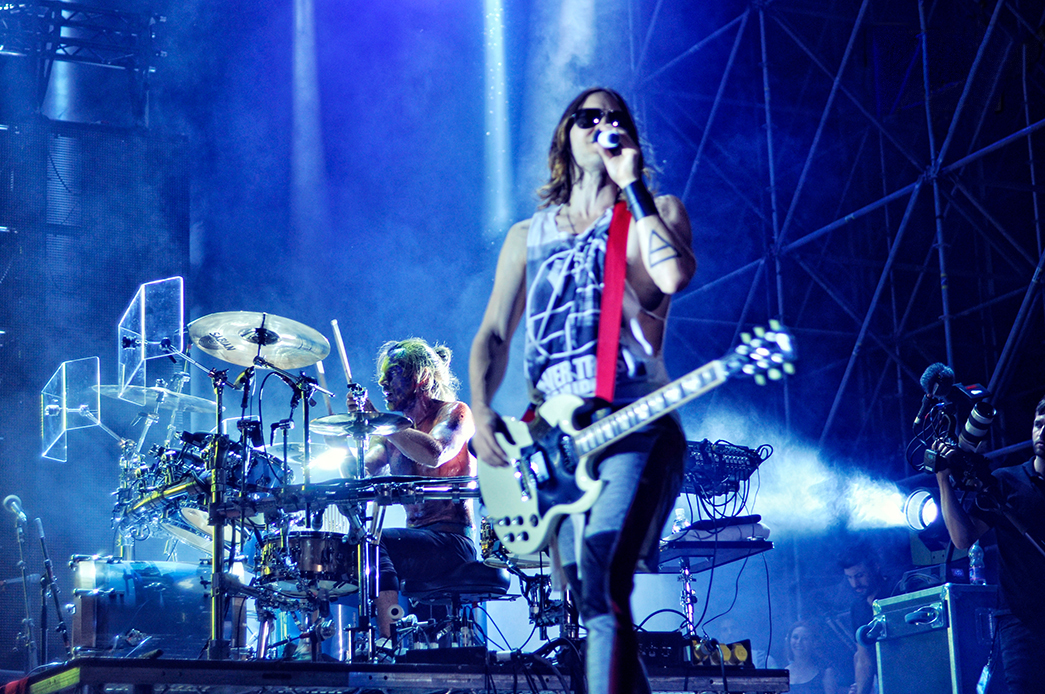
Thirty Seconds to Mars performing in July 2013

The tour was met with high praise from critics. Ashley Zimmerman from the New Times Broward-Palm Beach called the opening night of the tour "memorable", describing the set by Thirty Seconds to Mars as "a bit like a party", during which lead vocalist Jared Leto provided "raw and beautiful vocals". She further wrote that co-headliner Linkin Park played a "great mix of old and new songs" that was able to please those who brought the band to fame, while still showcasing the newest work. Jay Cridlin of the Tampa Bay Times commented that the two bands made Steinbrenner Field's return to concert a "smashing spectacle" creating a "powerful, festival-like feeling". He felt that Thirty Seconds to Mars delivered a "fully committed performance", praising the band's energy on stage, and noticed the "futuristic" production of the show by Linkin Park. Alison Angel, writing for Creative Loafing Charlotte, opined that the tour offered fans a chance to catch "three big rock bands" on a single event and felt that each performance was a "sight to behold". She further said, "between AFI tearing up the stage before the headliners even appeared, to the theatrics in Thirty Seconds to Mars' act and the grand performance of hard-rocking Linkin Park, fans walked out with a sense that this moment was truly once in a lifetime." Danny Crandall of The Sun Chronicle commented that Linkin Park "blitzed through an intense, head-bobbing" set, while Thirty Seconds to Mars played a "rousing performance" high on audience interaction.

Loudwire's Mary Ouellette, who attended the same show, felt that Thirty Seconds to Mars emphatically invited the crowd into their self-proclaimed cult, conducting a "straight up rock 'n' roll sermon", while Linkin Park took a different direction fueled by the "latest in technology and good old-fashioned angst". She concluded in her review, "Strangely enough, the combined forces made for one of the most memorable tours of the summer." Andrej Ivanov from The Scene Magazine who attended the show in Montreal, gave a positive review and hailed Linkin Park's "outstanding setlist" and Thirty Seconds to Mars' musicianship. He also complimented special guest AFI for "bringing it back to our angsty teenage years". Chris Riemenschneider of the Star Tribune, while praising Thirty Seconds to Mars' performance, gave a negative response to the set by Linkin Park, noticing that older tracks were abbreviated to make room for a drum solo and less impactful songs. In his review for The Arizona Republic, Ed Masley commended the set by Linkin Park featuring a "well-chosen mixture of career-defining hits and album tracks" and hailed the inspirational and charismatic performance by Thirty Seconds to Mars. Mary Bonney from LA Music Blog, reviewing the concert at the Hollywood Bowl, felt that the tour delivered an "epic rock experience that turned up the heat".

== Broadcast and recordings ==
In August 2014, it was announced that VyRT would exclusively broadcast worldwide the performance scheduled on September 15 at the Hollywood Bowl in Los Angeles. Sales for digital tickets began on September 3. VyRT provided access to several different experience packages featuring backstage interactivity with both bands and exclusive content. On September 15, before Thirty Seconds to Mars took to the stage, the VyRT platform was hacked and was a victim of a piracy. Jared Leto, founder of the streaming service, was forced to delay the performance by Thirty Seconds to Mars by an hour to resolve the issue. The audience eventually lost approximately three minutes of actual stage time, but the set list was shortened. The event included real-time social community engagement from audiences worldwide. A second broadcast of the show was later scheduled for September 17, 2014. The performance by Thirty Seconds to Mars became commercially available for download in October 2014 through VyRT. Footage recorded during the Carnivores Tour was uploaded to Linkin Park's official YouTube account.

== Set list ==
This set list is representative of the show in Charlotte at PNC Music Pavilion. It does not represent all dates throughout the tour.

AFI

1. "The Leaving Song Pt. II"
2. "Girl's Not Grey"
3. "I Hope You Suffer"
4. "Love Like Winter"
5. "Medicate"
6. "17 Crimes"
7. "The Days of the Phoenix"
8. "Silver and Cold"
9. "Miss Murder"

Thirty Seconds to Mars

1. "Up in the Air"
2. "Night of the Hunter"
3. "Search and Destroy"
4. "This Is War"
5. "Conquistador"
6. "Kings and Queens"
7. "Do or Die"
8. "City of Angels"
9. "End of All Days"
10. "Hurricane"
11. "From Yesterday"
12. "The Kill"
13. "Closer to the Edge"

Linkin Park

1. "Guilty All the Same"
2. "Given Up"
3. "With You"
4. "One Step Closer"
5. "Blackout"
6. "Papercut"
7. "Rebellion"
8. "Runaway"
9. "Wastelands"
10. "Castle of Glass"
11. "Leave Out All the Rest" / "Shadow of the Day" / "Iridescent"
12. "Robot Boy"
13. "Numb"
14. "Waiting for the End"
15. "Final Masquerade"
16. "Wretches and Kings" / "Remember the Name"
17. "Dirt off Your Shoulder" / "Lying from You"
18. "Somewhere I Belong"
19. "In the End"
20. "Faint"

Encore

21. "Burn It Down"
22. "Lost in the Echo"
23. "New Divide"
24. "Until It's Gone"
25. "What I've Done"
26. "Bleed It Out"

== Tour dates ==
List of 2014 concerts
| Date | City | Country | Venue |
|---|---|---|---|
| August 8, 2014 | West Palm Beach | United States | Cruzan Amphitheatre |
| August 9, 2014 | Tampa | United States | Steinbrenner Field |
| August 12, 2014 | Charlotte | United States | PNC Music Pavilion |
| August 13, 2014 | Bristow | United States | Jiffy Lube Live |
| August 15, 2014 | Camden | United States | Susquehanna Bank Center |
| August 16, 2014 | Mansfield | United States | Xfinity Center |
| August 18, 2014 | Holmdel Township | United States | PNC Bank Arts Center |
| August 19, 2014 | Wantagh | United States | Nikon at Jones Beach Theater |
| August 21, 2014 | Darien Lake | United States | Darien Lake Performing Arts Center |
| August 23, 2014 | Montreal | Canada | Parc Jean-Drapeau |
| August 24, 2014 | Toronto | Canada | Air Canada Centre |
| August 26, 2014 | St. Paul | United States | Minnesota State Fair |
| August 27, 2014 | Winnipeg | Canada | MTS Centre |
| August 29, 2014 | Tinley Park | United States | First Midwest Bank Amphitheatre |
| August 30, 2014 | Clarkston | United States | DTE Energy Music Theatre |
| September 5, 2014 | The Woodlands | United States | The Cynthia Woods Mitchell Pavilion |
| September 6, 2014 | Dallas | United States | Gexa Energy Pavilion |
| September 8, 2014 | Denver | United States | Fiddler's Green Amphitheatre |
| September 10, 2014 | Phoenix | United States | US Airways Arena |
| September 11, 2014 | Irvine | United States | Verizon Wireless Amphitheatre |
| September 13, 2014 | George | United States | The Gorge |
| September 15, 2014 | Los Angeles | United States | Hollywood Bowl |
| September 16, 2014 | Chula Vista | United States | Sleep Train Amphitheatre |
| September 18, 2014 | Wheatland | United States | Sleep Train Amphitheatre |
| September 19, 2014 | Concord | United States | Concord Pavilion |
