= The Hunting Party Tour =

2014–15 concert tour by Linkin Park

- World tour by Linkin Park
- Promotional poster for tour
- Location: North America; South America; Asia; Europe
- Associated album: The Hunting Party; The Black Market; Restoring Force
- Start date: May 30, 2014
- End date: September 6, 2015
- Legs: 5
- No. of shows: 54
- Box office: $123.0 million
Linkin Park tour chronology
Carnivores Tour (2014)	The Hunting Party Tour (2014–2015)	One More Light World Tour (2017)

The Hunting Party Tour was the eleventh concert tour by the American rock band Linkin Park. It was launched in support of Linkin Park's sixth studio album, The Hunting Party (2014). The tour was partially announced in May 2014 through a teaser released after the release of trailer of a co-headlined tour Carnivores Tour by Linkin Park and Thirty Seconds to Mars. Later, the tour was officially announced on November 23 with a whole trailer in promotion. Its first leg under the name European Tour began on May 30, 2014, in Lisboa, Portugal, and ended on June 14 in Castle Donington, England, where they played Hybrid Theory in its entirety. The tour also featured special guests Of Mice & Men and Rise Against. On January 15, 2015, the band begun the world tour for The Hunting Party with the first leg under North American Tour. During a show at Indianapolis, Chester Bennington injured his leg, which led to the cancellation of the tour North American Tour. The band continued the world tour on May 9, performing at the first edition of Rock In Rio in America. It was Linkin Park's last full album tour to feature Chester Bennington as vocalist before his death in 2017.

== Background ==
Rumors of a tour from Linkin Park first circulated after the release of the trailer for the Carnivorous Tour. The tour's first leg was in Europe where the band played nine shows. The leg had a duration of sixteen days. The tour began with the "Rock In Rio" show in Lisboa. And later the tour took a break after the Download Festival where the band played Hybrid Theory as a whole album together for the first time. The first leg included shows like Rock in Rio, Rock am Ring, Rock im Park, Alfa Romeo City Sound, Greenfield and Download Festival.

The second leg of the tour started after the end of the Carnivores Tour, and was titled as "The Hunting Party European Tour". The duration of the second leg was twenty-two days which included sixteen shows. Of Mice & Men were included as special guest for this leg and also toured with Linkin Park in North America. The leg was the return of band from North America back to Europe. It started on November 3, at Zürich in Switzerland. The same date was also the official declaration of "The Hunting Party Tour". The show at O_{2} World in Berlin became the first live concert in the world to be broadcast at Astra 19.2 degrees East in Ultra HD (3840 x 2160 pixel) in HEVC standard, at 50 fps and a color depth of 10 bit. The broadcast was confirmed on November 13, by Warner Music Germany and SES. The band released a pop up store in Berlin during the tour, and it was sponsored by Samsung.

The third leg of the tour was officially announced on November 3, 2014, after the completion of Carnivores Tour. The trailer revealed that the tour would feature guest artists like Of Mice & Men and Rise Against'. The second leg was supposed to have nineteen shows but only three shows took place, after the cancellation of the rest shows, due to the leg injury of Chester Bennington. Later on another additional leg was introduced as North American Summer Tour in support of the album. Whereas Of Mice and Men and Rise Against were not included in the line up.

The concert tour kept going by continuing the second leg of European tour. The leg is scheduled to take place after the Stone Temple Pilots with Chester Bennington's Spring U.S. Tour and seven headlining concerts by the band like Rock in Rio USA where the band will play with artists like Deftones, John Legend, No Doubt, Metallica, and Taylor Swift, Rock on the Range, Rocklahoma, Amnesia Rockfest, Loudwire Music Festival and Summerfest. This leg will feature Lower Than Atlantis as special guests for the Berlin show. The shows included Rock in Roma and the FM4 Frequency Festival.

A new leg was introduced during early May, which included five shows in China. The leg was named as "The Hunting Party China Tour". The leg was powered by Life and presented by Mercedes-Benz. All the shows during the leg will take place at stadiums across China. Only eight hours after the announcement, the box office for the five concerts broke past 24 million yuan ($3.8 million). Also, since the announcement, tickets for the concert have almost sold out.

== Development ==
Sales for general tickets began on November 7, 2014. Linkin Park offered pre-sale tickets for the fan club members. The set list mixed The Hunting Party with the rest of the band's catalog. A minute-long trailer for the tour premiered in November 2014, featuring a British narrator and assorted live scenes, paired with some of the bands' songs, including "Bleed It Out", "In The End", "Guilty All the Same", "Final Masquerade", "What I've Done" and "Rebellion" by Linkin Park and "I Don't Want to Be Here Anymore", "Tragedy + Time" by Rise Against. The promotional poster for the tour featured the hashtag as "#THEHUNTINGPARTYTOUR". The volunteering during the tour was done by "Music for Relief" The Chinese leg of the tour was powered by "Life" and presented by "Mercedes-Benz". The presale of the tickets started on May 6. The tickets were provided by "Yongle Ticket" and "228".

== Opening acts ==
- Animal Jazz (European tour selective dates)
- Fall Out Boy (Stadion Miejski and Ippodromo del Galoppo)
- Of Mice & Men (United States)
- Rise Against (United States)
- Mad Caddies (Marina de Montebello)
- Nothing More (Jam Ranch)
- A Day to Remember (Jam Ranch and Marcus Amphitheater)
- While She Sleeps (Rybnik Stadium)
- The Last Internationale (Stadion Miejski w Rybniku)
- My Riot (Stadion Miejski w Rybniku)
- Disco Ensemble (Himos Park)
- Dead by April (Himos Park)
- Lower Than Atlantis (Stadion An der Alten Försterei)
- Broiler (Esprit Arena)
- Kraftklub (Esprit Arena)
- Simple Plan (Ippodromo delle Capannelle)

== Gross ==
Though the band had only three shows in North America after the cancellation of the remaining dates, the gross compiled by the tour was $1,022,937 making the band the third largest gross collector of January. The shows between November 22–24, made Linkin Park again the third largest gross collector with $3,154,280 collected. The tour had only five shows in China, but as the shows were announced, the box office broke past 24 million yuan ($3.8 million).

== Set list ==
The following set list is representative of the show in Frankfurt, Germany. It is not meant to represent all dates throughout the tour.

1. "Guilty All the Same" (with Mashup Intro #2, containing samples of "Session", "The Requiem", "1 Stp Klosr", "The Summoning", and "The Catalyst")
2. "Given Up"
3. "With You"
4. "One Step Closer"
5. "Blackout" Instrumental
6. "Papercut" (shortened)
7. "Rebellion"
8. "Runaway" (shortened)
9. "Wastelands"
10. "Castle of Glass" (includes M. Shinoda remix)
11. "Leave Out All the Rest" / "Shadow of the Day" / "Iridescent"
12. "Robot Boy" Instrumental
13. Joe Hahn DJ set
14. "Numb" (with "Numb/Encore" intro/outro)
15. "Waiting for the End" (includes "Apaches" intro with "Until It Breaks" rap and "Wall of Noise" outro)
16. "Final Masquerade"
17. "Wretches and Kings" / "Remember the Name"
18. "Dirt off Your Shoulder" / "Lying from You"
19. "Somewhere I Belong"
20. "In the End"
21. "Faint"
  Encore
22. "Burn It Down" (shortened)
23. "Lost in the Echo" (shortened)
24. "New Divide" (shortened)
25. "Until It's Gone" (shortened with rap intro)
26. "What I've Done"
27. "Bleed It Out"

=== Notes ===
- "Guilty All the Same" was removed from the tour after January 2015 due to Rob Bourdon having shoulder problems and Brad Delson hurting his wrist, both while playing it.
- "Until It's Gone" was removed after 2014 due to "political reasons" that were beyond the band's control.
- "Keys to the Kingdom" and "Mark the Graves" were considered for the tour, but didn't end up being rehearsed due to time constraints.

== Tour dates ==
Date	City	Country	Venue	Opening acts	Attendance	Revenue
Europe
May 30, 2014 (Note: This show was played for "Rock in Rio".)	Lisbon	Portugal	Parque da Bela Vista	Queens Of The Stone Age	90,000 / 90,000	$39,000,000
June 1, 2014	Saint Petersburg	Russia	Petrovsky Stadium	Queens Of The Stone Age	21,405 / 21,405	$39,000,000
June 2, 2014	Moscow	Russia	Olympic Stadium (Moscow)	Queens Of The Stone Age	30,000 / 30,050	$39,000,000
June 5, 2014	Wrocław	Poland	Stadion Miejski	Fall Out Boy	41,000 / 42,771	$39,000,000
June 7, 2014 (Note: This show was played for "Rock am Ring".)	Adenau, Rheinland-Pfalz	Germany	Nürburgring	Animal Jazz	80,000 / 82,000	$39,000,000
June 8, 2014 (Note: This show was played for "Rock im Park".)	Nuremberg	Germany	Volkspark Dutzendteich	Fall Out Boy	70,000 / 70,000	$39,000,000
June 10, 2014	Milan	Italy	Ippodromo del Galoppo	Fall Out Boy	32,000 / 32,000	$39,000,000
June 12, 2014	Interlaken	Switzerland	Flughafen Interlaken	Fall Out Boy	12,000 / 12,000	$39,000,000
June 14, 2014 (Note: This show was played for "Download Festival".)	Castle Donington	England	Donington Park	N/A	105,000 / 110,000	$39,000,000
TOTAL					481,405 / 490,226 (98%)	$39,000,000
The Hunting Party Brazil Tour
October 18, 2014 (Note: This show was played for "Circuito Banco do Brasil in Belo Horizonte".)	Belo Horizonte	Brazil	Outside of Mineirão	Panic! at the Disco	20,000 / 20,000	$2,800,000
October 19, 2014 (Note: This show was played for "Circuito Banco do Brasil in Brasília".)	Brasília	Brazil	Outside of Estádio Nacional Mané Garrincha	Panic! at the Disco	20,000 / 20,000	$2,800,000
TOTAL					40,000 / 40,000 (100%)	$2,800,000
The Hunting Party European Tour
November 3, 2014	Zurich	Switzerland	Hallenstadion	Of Mice & Men	13,000 / 13,000	$17,500,000
November 4, 2014	Stuttgart	Germany	Hanns-Martin-Schleyer-Halle	Of Mice & Men	14,000 / 14,000	$17,500,000
November 6, 2014	Cologne	Germany	Lanxess Arena	Of Mice & Men	18,000 / 18,000	$17,500,000
November 7, 2014	Amsterdam	Netherlands	Ziggo Dome	Of Mice & Men	17,000 / 17,000	$17,500,000
November 9, 2014	Oberhausen	Germany	König-Pilsener-ARENA	Of Mice & Men	14,000 / 14,000	$17,500,000
November 10, 2014	Hamburg	Germany	O_{2} World	Of Mice & Men	12,942 / 14,402	$17,500,000
November 12, 2014	Leipzig	Germany	Arena Leipzig	Of Mice & Men	14,000 / 14,000	$17,500,000
November 13, 2014	Munich	Germany	Olympiahalle	Of Mice & Men	15,000 / 15,000	$17,500,000
November 14, 2014	Vienna	Austria	Wiener Stadthalle	Of Mice & Men	15,000 / 15,000	$17,500,000
November 16, 2014	Paris	France	Palais Omnisports de Paris-Bercy	Of Mice & Men	19,000 / 19,000	$17,500,000
November 17, 2014	Frankfurt	Germany	Festhalle	Of Mice & Men	14,000 / 14,000	$17,500,000
November 19, 2014	Berlin	Germany	O_{2} World	Of Mice & Men	14,930 / 14,930	$17,500,000
November 20, 2014	Bremen	Germany	ÖVB Arena	Of Mice & Men	14,500 / 14,500	$17,500,000
November 22, 2014	Manchester	England	Phones 4u Arena	Of Mice & Men	15,192 /15,444	$17,500,000
November 23, 2014	London	England	O_{2} Arena	Of Mice & Men	26,922 / 31 580	$17,500,000
November 24, 2014	London	England	O_{2} Arena	Of Mice & Men	26,922 / 31 580	$17,500,000
TOTAL					252,000 / 252,000 (100%)	$17,500,000
North America
January 15, 2015	Orlando	United States	Amway Center	Of Mice & Men; Rise Against	9,197 / 10,973	$537,490
January 17, 2015	Nashville	United States	Bridgestone Arena	Of Mice & Men; Rise Against	6,126 / 8,191	$485,447
January 18, 2015	Indianapolis	United States	Bankers Life Fieldhouse	Of Mice & Men; Rise Against	—N/a	—N/a
TOTAL					15,323 / 19,164 (80%)	$1,022,937
North American Summer Tour
May 9, 2015 (Note: This show was played for "Rock in Rio USA".)	Las Vegas	United States	MGM Resorts International	Of Mice & Men; Rise Against	85,000 / 85,000	$15,700,000
May 17, 2015 (Note: This show was played for "Rock on the Range".)	Columbus	United States	Mapfre Stadium	Of Mice & Men; Rise Against	40,000 / 40,000	$15,700,000
May 23, 2015 (Note: This show was played for "Rocklahoma". The show was cancelled due to bad weather.)	Pryor	United States	Catch the Fever Music Festival Grounds	Of Mice & Men; Rise Against	60,000 / 72,000	$15,700,000
May 24, 2015 (Note: This show was played for "Bud Light River City Rockfest".)	San Antonio	United States	AT&T Center	Of Mice & Men; Rise Against	19,000 / 19,000	$15,700,000
June 19, 2015 (Note: This show was played for "Amnesia Rockfest".)	Montebello	Canada	Marina de Montebello	Mad Caddies	66,600 / 66,600	$15,700,000
June 23, 2015	Mexico City	Mexico	Arena Ciudad de México	—N/a	17,600 / 22,300	$15,700,000
June 25, 2015	Monterrey	Mexico	Arena Monterrey	—N/a	11,500 / 17,599	$15,700,000
June 27, 2015 (Note: This show was played for "Loudwire Music Festival".)	Mack	United States	Jam Ranch	Nothing More; A Day To Remember	30,000 / 30,000	$15,700,000
June 30, 2015 (Note: This show was played for "Summerfest".)	Milwaukee	United States	Marcus Amphitheater	the one and only PPL MVR; A Day To Remember	25,000 / 25,000	$15,700,000
TOTAL					282,700 / 295,499 (96%)	$15,700,000
The Hunting Party China Tour
July 17, 2015	Nanjing	China	Nanjing Olympic Sports Centre	Rise Against	57,000 / 61,443	$13,000,000
July 19, 2015	Shenzhen	China	Shenzhen Bay Sports Center	Rise Against	20,000 / 20,000	$13,000,000
July 22, 2015	Shanghai	China	Hongkou Football Stadium	Rise Against	33,060 / 33,060	$13,000,000
July 24, 2015	Chongqing	China	Chongqing Olympic Sports Center	Rise Against	58,680 / 58,680	$13,000,000
July 26, 2015	Beijing	China	Workers' Stadium	Rise Against	66,161 / 66,161	$13,000,000
TOTAL					294,700 / 305,499 (96%)	$13,000,000
The Hunting Party European Tour
August 20, 2015 (Note: This show was played for "Pukkelpop".)	Hasselt	Belgium	Kempische Steenweg	Limp Bizkit	66,000 / 66,000	$32,000,000
August 22, 2015 (Note: This show was played for "FM4 Frequency".)	Sankt Pölten	Austria	Green Park	Kendrick Lamar	100,000 / 100,000	$32,000,000
August 23, 2015 (Note: This show was played for "Rock'n'Heim".)	Hockenheim	Germany	Hockenheimring	Farin Urlaub; Kraftklub; Halestorm	14,000 / 14,000	$32,000,000
August 25, 2015	Rybnik	Poland	Rybnik Stadium	The Last Internationale; My Riot	20,000 / 20,000	$32,000,000
August 27, 2015	Minsk	Belarus	Minsk Arena	Rili Dope	13,500 / 13,700	$32,000,000
August 29, 2015	Moscow	Russia	Sports Complex Olimpiyskiy	Jack Action	22,000 / 25,000	$32,000,000
August 31, 2015	Jämsä	Finland	Himos Park	Disco Ensemble; Dead By April	18,000 / 18,920	$32,000,000
September 3, 2015	Berlin	Germany	Stadion An der Alten Försterei	Lower Than Atlantis	40,000 / 40,000	$32,000,000
September 5, 2015 (Note: This show was played for "Rock im Sektor".)	Düsseldorf	Germany	Esprit Arena	Broilers; Kraftklub	50,000 / 55,600	$32,000,000
September 6, 2015 (Note: This show was played for "Rock in Roma".)	Rome	Italy	Ippodromo delle Capannelle	Simple Plan	40,000 / 40,000	$32,000,000
TOTAL					383,500 / 393,220 (98%)	$32,000,000
Grand Total					1,749,628 / 1,795,608 (97%)	$123,000,000
