= All for Nothing (song) =

Song by Linkin Park featuring Page Hamilton

from the album The Hunting Party and Pro Evolution Soccer 2015
- Released: August 22, 2014
- Recorded: 2013–2014
- Genre: Post-hardcore; rap rock; hard rock
- Length: 3:33
- Label: Warner Bros.; Machine Shop
- Songwriter: Linkin Park
- Producers: Mike Shinoda; Brad Delson

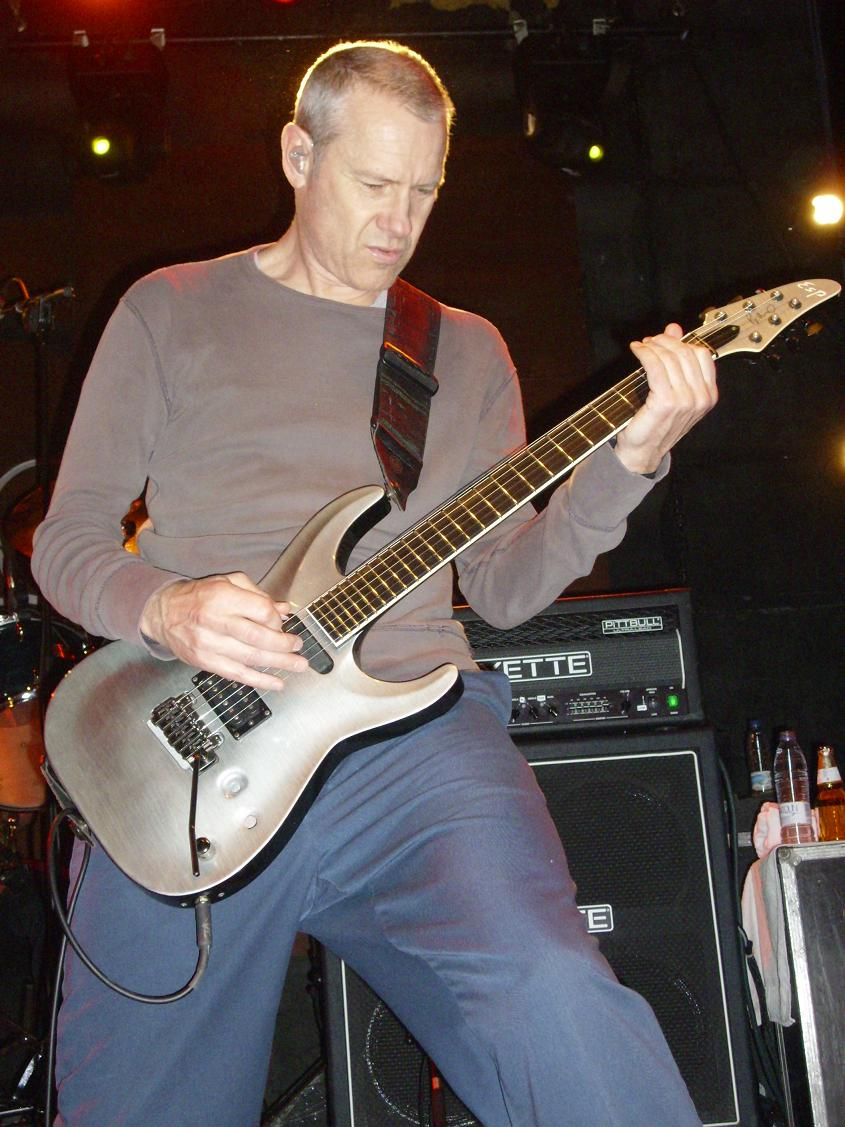
Featured guest Hamilton in 2014

"All for Nothing" is a song by American rock band Linkin Park featuring American guitarist and singer Page Hamilton of alternative metal band Helmet from their sixth studio album, The Hunting Party. The song appears on the album as the second track. It has entered the UK Rock chart at number 23, although it hasn't been released as a single. The song was written by the band and produced by co-lead vocalist Mike Shinoda and lead guitarist Brad Delson. The song is featured in the video game Pro Evolution Soccer 2015. The song was not performed by the band during the album's accompanying The Hunting Party Tour, and would not see a live debut until the From Zero World Tour in 2024.

== Composition ==
"All for Nothing" is explained in an early preview for the album as, "This one, when performed live, will get the crowd moving for sure. With a hip-hop flow in the first verse this quickly turns into almost a punk anthem. The song is relentless and unapologetic, with a stellar guitar solo by Brad Delson. It's no surprise that this heavy tune is hardcore especially since it features a guest spot Helmet vocalist and guitarist Page Hamilton." The song continues its outro into the band's first single from the album, "Guilty All the Same".

== Live performances ==
"All for Nothing" was initially never performed live prior to Bennington's death in July 2017. Following Linkin Park's announced reformation in 2024 with new members Emily Armstrong and Colin Brittain, "All for Nothing" was performed with Hamilton live for the first time at the band's concert at the Globe Life Field in Arlington, Texas on November 8, 2024 as part of the From Zero World Tour, since Hamilton served as an opener with his band Helmet for the concert. Armstrong, the band's new vocalist, sang Bennington's parts of the song.

== Reception ==
In a track-by-track review for the album, by Billboard the song is given positive review and explained as, "The guitars stay heavy, but the drums slow down and swing just enough for Shinoda to bust some nimble rhymes about refusing to obey orders. It doesn't really matter who he's railing against — this is defiance for defiance's sake. That's Helmet's Page Hamilton on the chorus, lending credibility more than anything else."

== Charts ==
Chart performance for "All or Nothing"
Chart (2014)	Peak position
UK Rock & Metal (OCC)	23
