= Wastelands (song) =

Single by Linkin Park

from the album The Hunting Party
- Released: June 1, 2014
- Recorded: 2013–2014
- Genre: Alternative metal; nu metal; rap metal
- Length: 3:10 (radio edit); 3:15 (album version)
- Label: Warner Bros.; Machine Shop
- Songwriter: Linkin Park
- Producers: Mike Shinoda; Brad Delson; Rob Cavallo (co.)

Linkin Park singles chronology
"Until It's Gone" (2014)	"Wastelands" (2014)	"Rebellion" (2014)

Music video
- "Wastelands (Music Video)" on YouTube "Wastelands (Official Lyric Video)" on YouTube

"Wastelands" is a song by American rock band Linkin Park from their sixth studio album, The Hunting Party. The song was written by the band and produced by co-lead vocalist Mike Shinoda and Brad Delson, and co-produced by Rob Cavallo. "Wastelands" was sent to Sirius XM Radio radio stations in airplay on June 1, 2014, and was then released as the third official single on June 2. A 44 seconds long preview of the song was aired prior, and a minute long preview was used in the promotion of UFC on the date of release of the song. Later on the song was used as the theme song for "UFC". The cover art of the single was available three days before its release at SoundCloud. The song can be streamed on Sirius XM. It is also a playable song on the music video game Guitar Hero Live.

== Composition ==
According to Loudwire, "'Wastelands' starts with a hip-hop verse and the song has a lot of groove with heavy drum and bass. The chorus is catchy yet sludgy and has some grit to it. Watch out for the heavy breakdown in the middle of the song. Linkin Park takes you on a sonic roller-coaster ride as they play around with the tempo and ambiance of the song". The song continues its outro into the next track and the second single, "Until It's Gone", from The Hunting Party.

== Live performances ==
The song was debuted in Tucson, AZ during KMFA Day, which was the same date when the preview of the song was aired. The song was played live along with "Guilty All the Same" in which Shinoda raps Rakim's verse on during the performance, and "Until It's Gone". On May 30, 2014 at Rock in Rio, before the song began, while the short version of "Runaway" was being performed at Rock in Rio Lisboa, Mike Shinoda reached into his pocket during the performance and revealed CDs containing "Wastelands", which at time was not released on the internet and was only performed once during KFMA Day. He then tossed them out to fans who attempted to catch them before "Wastelands" was performed by the band, with one fan who got a CD from the drummer Rob Bourdon at a Meet and Greet, releasing the song on YouTube on the same day. This is also the day where the song was leaked online via digital download. Afterwards, the song became a staple during the Carnivores Tour and The Hunting Party Tour, almost always being played after "Runaway" and before "Castle of Glass".

"Wastelands" returned during the One More Light World Tour in 2017, and was the only song from The Hunting Party to survive the transition into the touring for One More Light. The song was always played after "The Catalyst", and before "One Step Closer" or "Burn It Down" (in a pair of shows during the South American leg only).

== Music video ==
The music video for the song was uploaded to Linkin Park's official YouTube account on June 25, 2014. The video features clips of fights in the Ultimate Fighting Championship over the live performance at Rock in Rio Lisboa recorded on May 30, 2014. Prior to the release of the music video, a lyric video was uploaded to the official YouTube account of the band on June 1, 2014.

As of November 2021, the song has 650K views on YouTube.

== Reception ==
In a track-by-track review by Billboard, the song praised Bennington singing about the "wasteland of today" as "one of those timeless and universal declarations of discontent that doesn't have to mean a damn thing."

== Track listing ==
Digital download
No.	Title	Writer(s)	Producer(s)	Length
1.	"Wastelands"	Linkin Park	Mike Shinoda; Brad Delson; Rob Cavallo (co.)	3:15

Promotional single
No.	Title	Writer(s)	Producer(s)	Length
1.	"Wastelands" (Single Edit)	Linkin Park	Shinoda; Delson; Cavallo (co.)	3:10

== Personnel ==
- Chester Bennington – vocals
- Mike Shinoda – rap vocals, piano, rhythm guitar, programming, keyboards
- Brad Delson – lead guitar, programming
- Dave "Phoenix" Farrell – bass guitar, backing vocals
- Joe Hahn – samples, programming
- Rob Bourdon – drums, percussion

== Charts ==
Chart performance for "Wastelands"
Chart (2014)	Peak position
Australia (ARIA)	64
Canada Digital Songs (Billboard)	57
France (SNEP)	76
Hungary (Single Top 40)	17
Portugal (AFP)	29
UK Rock & Metal (OCC)	7
US Hot Rock & Alternative Songs (Billboard)	25

== Release history ==
=== Commercial ===
Region	Date	Format	Label
Worldwide	June 2, 2014	Digital download	Warner Bros.

=== Promotional ===
Region	Date	Radio Format	Label
Canada	June 1, 2014	Modern rock / Alternative rock radio	Warner Bros.; Machine Shop
United States	June 1, 2014	Modern rock / Alternative rock radio	Warner Bros.; Machine Shop
