= The Hunting Party (album) =

2014 studio album by Linkin Park

- Standard edition cover

Studio album by Linkin Park
- Released: June 17, 2014
- Recorded: May 2013 – April 2014
- Studios: Larrabee (Van Nuys, California); EastWest (Hollywood); Glenwood Place (Los Angeles)
- Genres: Alternative metal; nu metal; hard rock; rap rock; rap metal
- Length: 45:12
- Labels: Warner Bros.; Machine Shop
- Producers: Brad Delson; Mike Shinoda

Linkin Park chronology
A Light That Never Comes (Remixes) (2014)	The Hunting Party (2014)	Mall: Music from the Motion Picture (2014)

Vinyl edition cover

Singles from The Hunting Party
- 1. "Guilty All the Same" Released: March 7, 2014; 2. "Until It's Gone" Released: May 6, 2014; 3. "Wastelands" Released: June 1, 2014; 4. "Rebellion" Released: June 4, 2014; 5. "Final Masquerade" Released: June 10, 2014

The Hunting Party is the sixth studio album by American rock band Linkin Park. The album, produced by band members Mike Shinoda and Brad Delson, was released by Warner Bros. Records and Machine Shop on June 17, 2014. It is the first album since Meteora (2003) not to be produced with Rick Rubin, who produced the band's previous three studio albums. The album's title is a contextual metaphor: Linkin Park is the party that is hunting to bring back the energy and soul of rock.

Stylistically, The Hunting Party is a departure from the electronic rock and experimental sound of the band's previous two studio albums, A Thousand Suns (2010) and Living Things (2012) and marks a return to the band's nu metal sound. The album, described by Shinoda as simply "a rock record", serves as a statement by the band against contemporary mainstream and active rock bands, accused by him as "trying to be other bands and playing it safe". Packaged by an artwork by Brandon Parvini based on an original drawing by James Jean, the album took under a year to record and produce, with material being improvisationally written by the band. The album also features guest appearances from Helmet's Page Hamilton, System of a Down's Daron Malakian, Rage Against the Machine's Tom Morello, and Rakim, marking the first time Linkin Park collaborated with other artists on a studio album.

The album was promoted by the band and Warner Bros, with multiple promotional teasers and interviews produced and published in the lead-up to the album's release and listening parties of the album being held worldwide on multiple dates. The band embarked on the Carnivores Tour, a double-headline tour with Thirty Seconds to Mars, as well as The Hunting Party Tour, in support of the album. Five singles from The Hunting Party have been released; "Guilty All the Same" in March 2014, "Until It's Gone" in May 2014, and "Wastelands", "Rebellion" and "Final Masquerade" in June 2014.

The album received generally positive reviews from critics, who praised its return to the heavier rock sound of their older albums. It debuted at number three on the US Billboard 200, and has placed at number four on Revolver's list of "The 20 Best Albums of 2014". The album was certified Platinum in United States for the sales of one million copies.

== Background ==
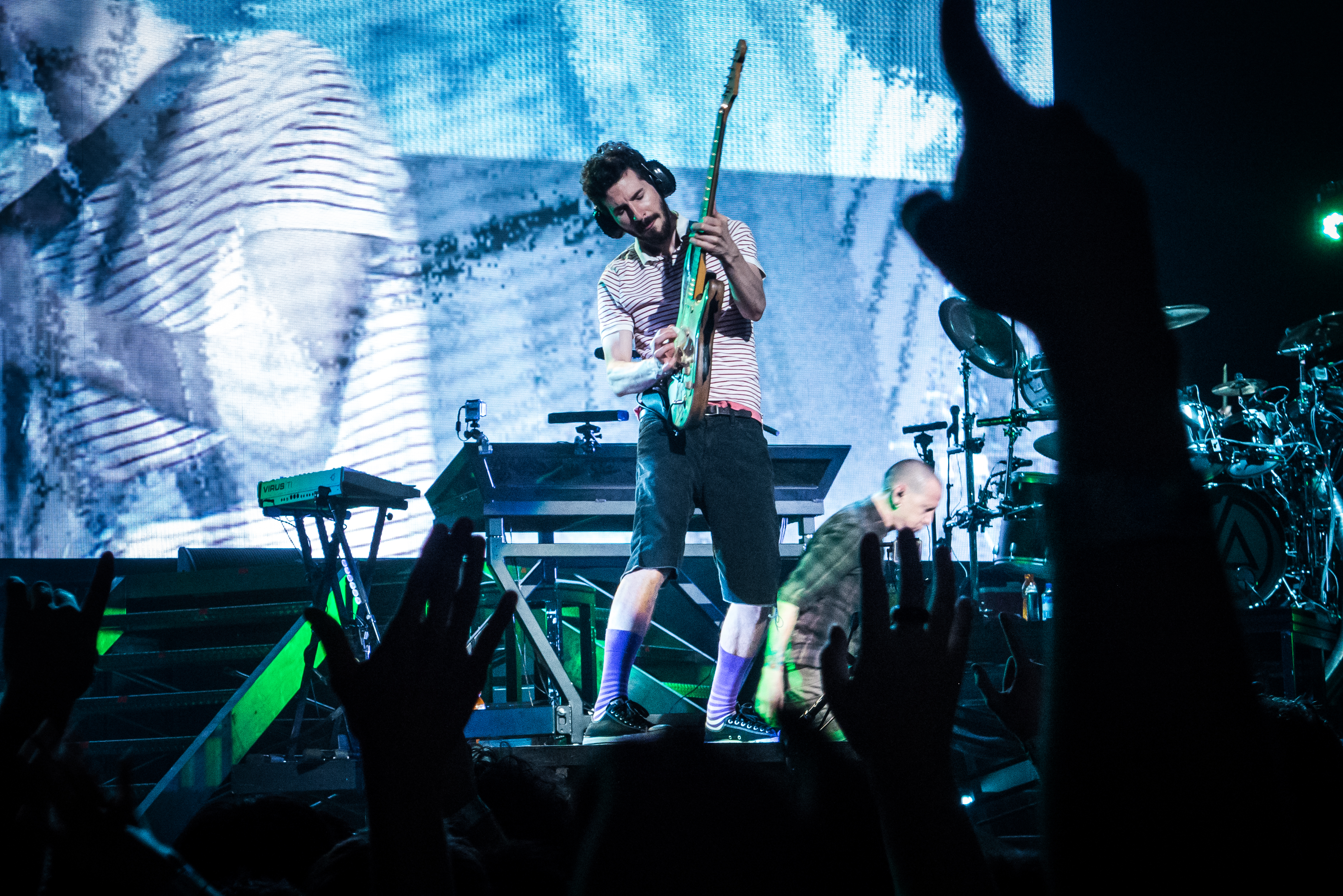
Linkin Park performing at Soundwave 2013, during the Living Things World Tour.

In 2010 and 2012 respectively, Linkin Park released their fourth and fifth studio albums A Thousand Suns and Living Things. The albums, both produced by Rick Rubin and Mike Shinoda, marked a shift in the band's musical direction from a nu metal-oriented sound, recognized with Hybrid Theory (2000) and Meteora (2003), to a more experimental and "cutting edge" sound. The electronica-influenced albums were commercially successful.

Production on the band's sixth studio album began as a result of a series of events in which Shinoda decided to drop the electronic and experimental sound of the band's previous two studio albums. Shinoda had originally recorded and produced demos, which continued the sound of A Thousand Suns and Living Things, for the band's sixth studio album during the band's Living Things World Tour in 2013. He presented the demos to his bandmates, which received positive reception from the rest of the band, and to Rubin, who was also positive towards the demos, though describing them to Shinoda as more "poppy" than he expected. However, Shinoda, after listening to the demos again after the end of the tour, felt a strong negativity towards his material, especially after Rubin's statements. In a Warner Music interview, Shinoda stated that "I don't even believe in this music. This is a mistake; I don't like what I'm making. I kind of went backwards into the process and scrapped all of it and started new stuff."

Following A Thousand Suns and Living Things, albums which were created with leaving behind a sound that was "not new and not cool anymore" in mind, the band's sixth studio album was approached as a return to the band's early sound, with the electronic sounds of their previous two studio albums being dropped in favor of the band's traditional rock instrumentation. Using Hybrid Theory as a template, the band composed and recorded it in context of modern times, in 2014 rather than 2000. Guitarist Brad Delson jokingly stated that the album was an "alternative Hybrid Theory" and "maybe its prequel", with the album being inspired by artists the band listened to before they started their musical career. Shinoda told Rolling Stone about the ideas surrounding The Hunting Party: "We're not 18-year-old kids making a loud record – we're 37-year-old adults making a loud record. And what makes a 37-year-old angry is different than what made us angry back in the day."

== Composition ==
The band took a different method in writing new material for The Hunting Party as opposed to their previous albums. While for all their previous albums they used the traditional method of writing, demoing and rerecording in the studio, songs were instead written and composed in the studio itself, with no material being written or composed beforehand. Delson spoke about the methods used on the album in an interview with Premier Guitar, saying that "Something unintentional might be the coolest sound I make all day, and knowing how to allow those mistakes to happen and to shape them potentially makes for some great music."

The album has been described as alternative metal, nu metal, hard rock, thrash metal, rap rock and rap metal by professional reviewers. Shinoda described the album's sound as a 1990s style of rock record: "It's a Rock record; "it's loud and it's Rock, but not in the sense of what you've heard before, which is more like '90s hardcore-punk–thrash". He described the "weak" status of modern rock in the music industry as an inspiration in recording a heavier rock album; to try to bring the sound of the 1990s back to the forefront. Shinoda criticized the modern state of alternative radio, stating "There's so much stuff that sounds like HAIM or CHVRCHES or Vampire Weekend that I'm full. The thing I'm hungry for is not that. I turn on the rock station in L.A. and it sounds like Disney commercial music." This led to a response from CHVRCHES, with their lead singer Lauren Mayberry calling Shinoda's comment "a pointless dig." Bennington agreed with Shinoda's comments, as he said, "The bands I was listening to when I was growing up were all doing really innovative shit—Jane's Addiction, Alice in Chains, Nirvana... Bands like the Refreshments and the Rembrandts, that music fucking angers me to this day. And the same thing is happening now, where there's all this stuff that feels like the soundtrack to 'Friends' or 'The Wizards of Waverly Place.'"

In an interview with MusicRadar, Delson stated that the album would feature guitar solos, something the band rarely used previously. He further stated that "this is from someone who was quoted early on as saying I hated them. Not that I hated them as a listener; I just don't want to play any; I shirked guitar solos. Early on, I felt as though the songs we were making aesthetically didn't want them. This new batch of songs, to me, always wants solos. I feel like every song has one."

== Recording ==
The Hunting Party was recorded at the Larrabee Sound Studios, located in Hollywood, Los Angeles. During the recording for the band's sixth studio album, the band would spend five or six days a week at the Larrabee Studios working on the record. The Hunting Party was also recorded in part at EastWest Studios, also located in Hollywood. There, drummer Rob Bourdon and Shinoda would record drums and percussion for the album. The band would also record other material for the album at EastWest on occasion.

In an interview with Rolling Stone, Shinoda said that the album was difficult for drummer Rob Bourdon, where he had to push himself to meet the music speed and style. He commented that "It's probably the hardest stuff he's ever played on one of our albums. He had to physically work his way up to it. He had to go running, lift weights, work with a trainer", eventually Bourdon feels that he had become a better drummer at the end of each day after recording. Shinoda later told Q magazine that Bourdon had to seek help from a chiropractor after he had broken his back recording material for the new album. Shinoda told Q that "Rob was killing himself. He played 10 hours a day for seven days straight and blew his back."

Orange, Bogner and ENGL brand amplifiers were used on the record by Delson, providing a "core sound" described by engineer Ethan Mates as "a small collection of core tones to be used in a sonically consistent way throughout the record". Chandler brand amps were also used for overdubs and "higher parts". Delson spoke about his studio setup for The Hunting Party, stating that "It's great to have a setup where I can run combinations of heads and cabs simultaneously to get the most appropriate tone, or do something more straightforward like record just one cabinet with two mikes".

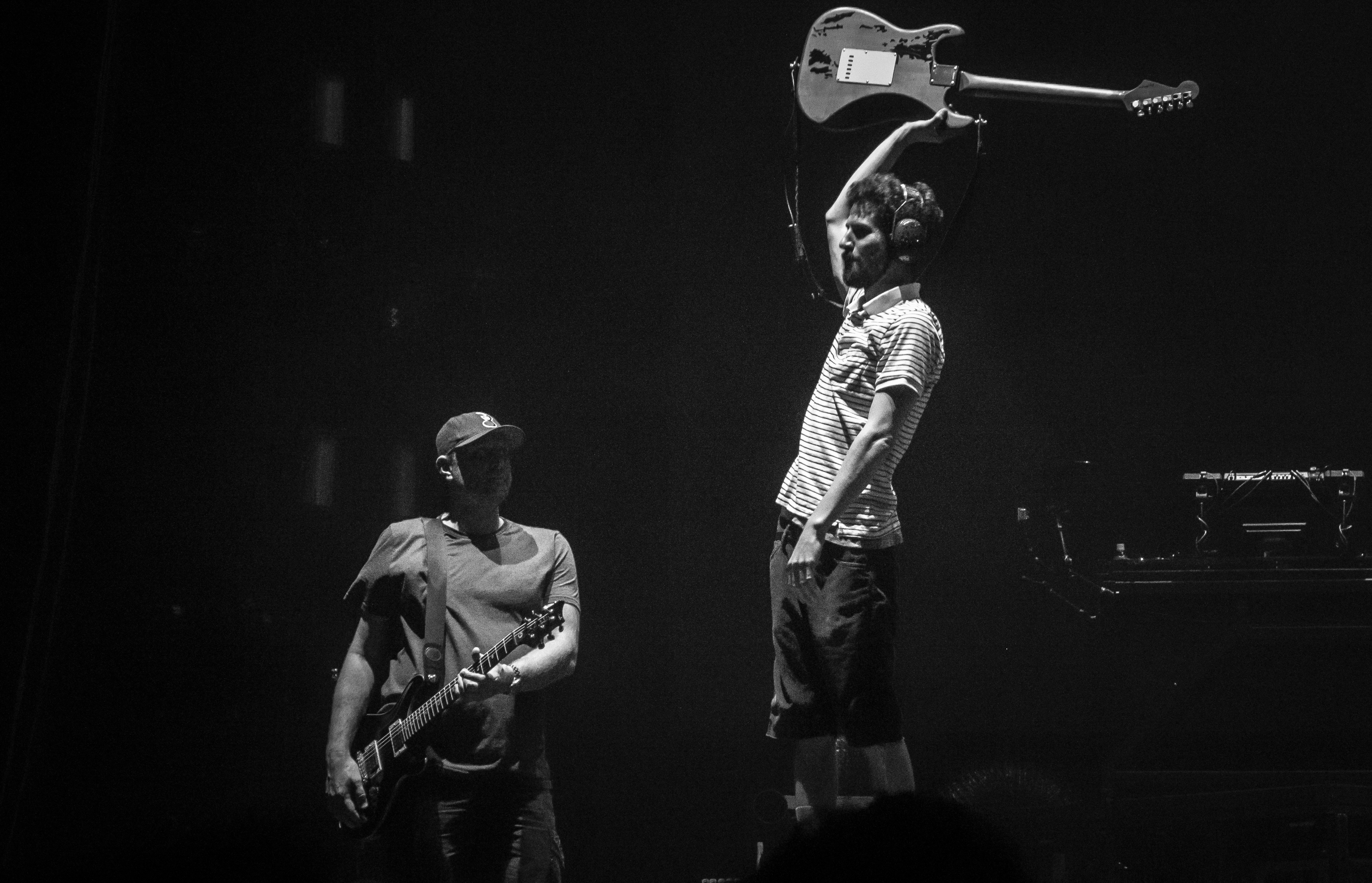
Delson contributed greatly to the production of The Hunting Party.

On the last few records I certainly played guitar in the studio, but I'd been focusing on other instruments. I've been playing guitar since I was 12, and it had become fascinating to learn keyboards, programming, and Pro Tools, which is like an instrument in itself. But these songs are all about rediscovering the guitar and having a lot of fun with it. There's an unpredictability to these songs that lends itself to me just picking up a guitar and playing insanity. Nothing is preplanned. For some of the faster solos I warm up, but not in an overtly methodical way. If I want to record a solo over at a fast tempo, I just noodle on that Strat for an hour until I'm hyper-fast. I don't want to merge onto the highway at 15 miles per hour. I want to be at full speed by the time I get thrown on to it.

— Brad Delson

Lead singer Chester Bennington arrived late in the recording process of the album, having been chosen to replace Scott Weiland in the band Stone Temple Pilots, and then proceeded to record High Rise and tour with the band for most of 2013. When he eventually joined the band in the studio, he was surprised to find the band had reverted to their heavier rock-centric sound. Bennington stated in an interview with Kerrang!: "Mike wrote tons while I was touring with Stone Temple Pilots last year. When I got home, there was a lot for me to catch up with, and he was playing me things and I was like, 'Dude, this is fucking awesome!' I was really surprised how heavy it was".

The album features four guest artists; Rakim from the hip hop duo Eric B. & Rakim on "Guilty All the Same", Page Hamilton from the American alternative metal band Helmet on "All for Nothing", Daron Malakian from System of a Down for the song "Rebellion" and Tom Morello of Rage Against the Machine fame on the song "Drawbar". Bennington commented on the collaborations, stating that "We really felt like if we need to be inspired and move in another direction. I think when we got Page in, Mike had written this chorus and sang it, and his voice had this tone, and it was unlike anything I'd heard from him before. And I was like, "Dude this is crazy, this sounds like a Helmet song! It's cool!" And we were like, "Dude, why don't we see if we can get like Page in here?" You know? And if that's why the song says it's feeling like it should be, then why don't we just go straight to the source".

== Packaging ==
=== Artwork ===
The album cover for The Hunting Party features a 3D modeled artwork by Brandon Parvini, who had previously designed the artworks for Living Things and the band's singles during the album's release cycle. The artwork was based on an original drawing, entitled "Archer", by visual artist James Jean that was created for the album. It is one of many artworks by Jean to be used in the packaging of the album, which also features, in deluxe editions of the album, a lithograph, T-shirt and a 36-page art book by him. Jean's traditional style, notably different to the artwork created for The Hunting Party had been previously described by Dana Jennings of The New York Times as "suffused with a dreamy romanticism and lyricism worthy of Maxfield Parrish, even as Mr. Jean subverts those and other isms."

Linkin Park had professed that they have been fans of James Jean's art for a while, describing discussions between the band and Jean as having "started naturally". Joe Hahn served as a creative director for the artwork of The Hunting Party, instructing Jean to "create a universe inhabited by powerful characters and defined by strange landscapes", with a general concept of having a unique "character" for each track on the album. Delson also contributed ideas of "internal and external struggles", metaphorically depicted on a battlefield, where images such as "flesh tearing and transforming into different forms and brittle shards of crystal erupting from organic matter" would recur. Shinoda explained: "We try to approach our art—packaging, merchandise, tour visuals, videos, anything—in a holistic way. All the parts are interconnected, and by creating great imagery that can be used in multiple contexts, we can immerse the fans in a universe that is consistent and unique to each release. It's always a work in progress, but I feel like we've learned a lot and continue to make it better each time."

James Jean was invited by Shinoda and Delson to listen to the band's rough material created early on during the recording sessions for The Hunting Party. He acknowledged the band's change of musical direction from A Thousand Suns and Living Things, and was inspired by the material to create artworks that were "charged with [the band's] intensity as well as their rationale for that change". However, Joe Hahn banned Jean from listening to any more material after Jean had performed some of the songs from memory on his piano. Jean originally sketched each individual artwork for The Hunting Party in a personal sketchbook, where it felt more intimate and less precious to Jean. The minimality of the images was intentional, as the artworks would eventually be made into 3D-modelled artworks where lighting and texture would be added to each character. 20 artworks were made in the space of a month by Jean for Brandon Parvini and his team to transform into 3D-modelled artworks, with Parvini choosing exactly which artworks would be modelled for The Hunting Party.

=== Title ===
The title of the album, The Hunting Party, is a contextual metaphor. The album, a return to the band's original harder rock-centric sounds, represents the band's desire to not only create something different from other rock bands, but to also bring back the "energy and soul" of rock itself, and that Linkin Park are the party that will hunt for that energy and soul. Shinoda elaborated on the title of the album in an interview with Kerrang! explaining: "We got so sick of other bands trying to be other bands and playing it safe the whole time, so the album name comes from a theory about culture becoming too passive, everyone just standing around waiting for opportunities to come to them instead of going out and getting theirs. I'm aware there are always going to be heavier bands than us, but The Hunting Party is Linkin Park going out and getting it for ourselves." The inspiration for the title came from a news article Shinoda read online about a Japanese writer's concerns about today's growing society. The writer described the young men of today as "herbivores", and explained how they are essentially grazing, waiting for an opportunity to come to them, rather than hunting for it.

== Promotion ==
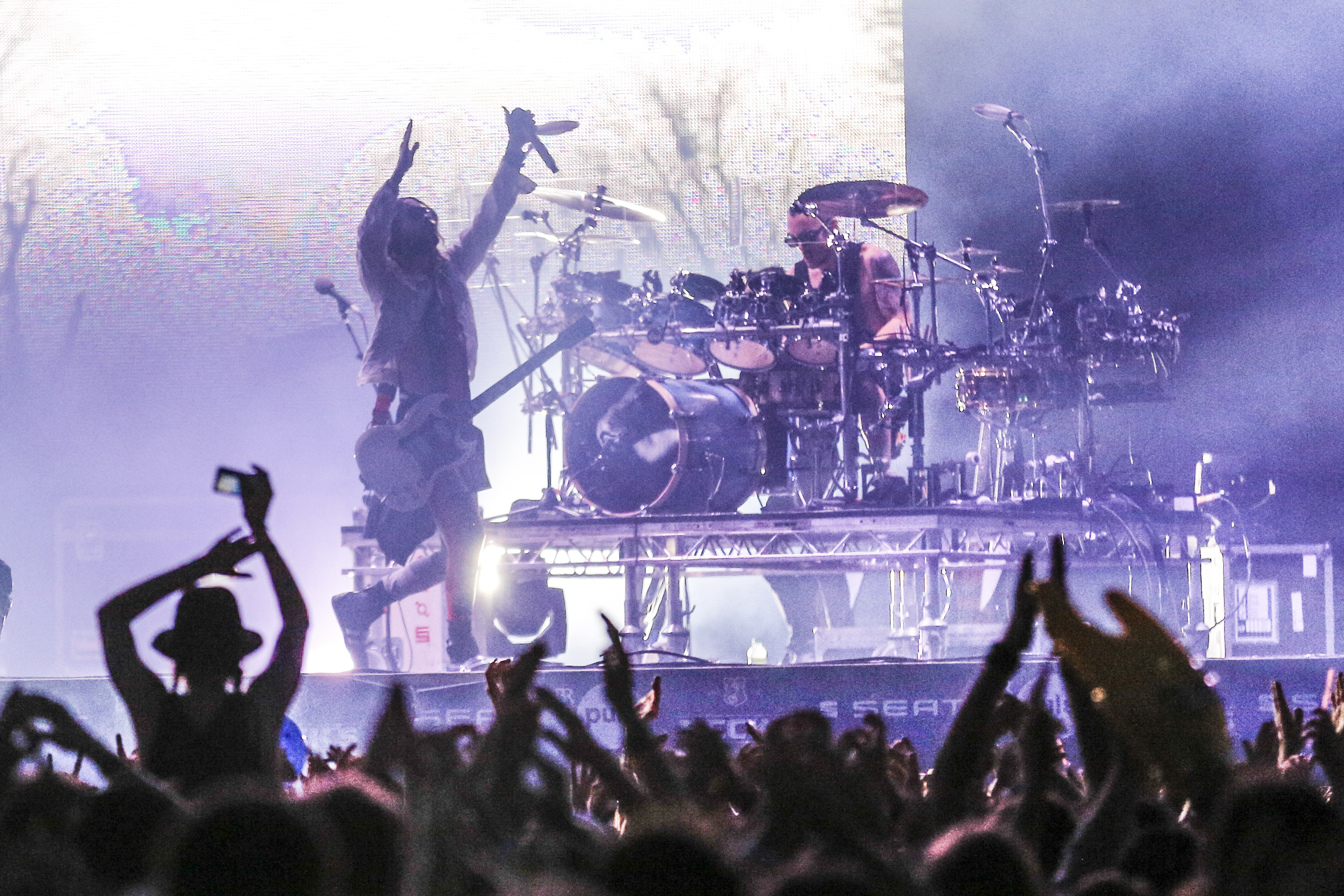
Linkin Park embarked with American rock band Thirty Seconds to Mars on the double-headline Carnivores Tour.

On March 6, 2014, the band premiered "Guilty All the Same", which features Rakim, from the album through Shazam. The track was later released by Warner Bros. on March 7, 2014, as the lead single promoting the then-unannounced sixth studio album by the band. A music video for "Guilty All the Same" also premiered on YouTube on March 25, 2014. The music video, a continuation of the band's collaboration with Xbox, was made entirely with the in-game engine of Team Dakota's 2014 sandbox video game Project Spark. Additionally, the course made for the music video was made openly available by the band, giving players of Project Spark on Microsoft Windows and the Xbox One the opportunity of editing and remixing the course.

While information about Linkin Park's sixth studio album had leaked beforehand, including the album's title and release date, The Hunting Party was officially unveiled by the band and Warner Bros. Records on April 9, 2014. The track listing of the album was additionally unveiled by Shinoda and Linkin Park's management team on April 27, 2014. "Until It's Gone" became the second track to be unveiled, and was released as the album's second single on May 6, 2014. Pre-orders for the album were also opened on the same day, with "Guilty all the Same" and "Until It's Gone" released early on the album's iTunes Store page. A music video for "Until It's Gone" was then released on June 11, 2014. "Wastelands" was released on the iTunes Store on June 1, 2014, and later as a single on June 2. On June 3, 2014, Bennington appeared on Zane Lowe's BBC Radio 1 to premiere the song, "Rebellion". An official lyric video was released alongside a release of the track on the iTunes Store the same day. It was later released as a single on June 4, and was released as the album's fourth retail single on October 13. On June 8, 2014, Linkin Park premiered the third single "Final Masquerade" on MTV.

A listening session for the album took place on May 23, 2014, in Los Angeles. Further listening sessions for Linkin Park Underground members were announced for June 4, 2014, in various locations worldwide. The band, additionally, hosted the tenth and eleventh editions of the LPU summit, a convention for Underground members, during the album cycle. The tenth edition was held at the Darien Lake Performing Arts Center in Darien, New York, on August 21, 2014, and the eleventh edition was held at the Cynthia Woods Mitchell Pavilion in The Woodlands, Texas, on September 5, 2014.

The band's first live performance of The Hunting Party album cycle was on May 24, 2014, at the KMFA Day music festival, in which they headlined. The band performed "Guilty All the Same", "Until It's Gone" and "Wastelands" for the first time. The band also performed as headliners at Rock in Rio Lisboa VI on May 30, 2014. During the performance, Shinoda tossed promotional singles containing the studio version of "Wastelands" out into the open audience, days before the song's official single release. Linkin Park are also set to embark on a double-headline tour of North America with Thirty Seconds to Mars in support of both The Hunting Party and Thirty Seconds to Mars' 2013 album Love, Lust, Faith and Dreams. The tour, dubbed the Carnivores Tour, spanned 25 dates in August and September 2014, with American rock band AFI serving as opening act during the entire tour. The band held another tour named as "The Hunting Party Tour", which started on May 30, 2014. However, some of the shows on the tour were cancelled due to Bennington breaking his leg.

== Critical reception ==
Professional ratings
Aggregate scores
Source	Rating
Metacritic	65/100
Review scores
Source	Rating
AllMusic	3.5/5 stars
Billboard	3.5/5 stars
Consequence of Sound	C−
The Guardian	3/5 stars
Loudwire	4/5 stars
The New Zealand Herald	4/5 stars
NME	6/10
Revolver	4/5
Rolling Stone	2.5/5 stars
USA Today	3/4 stars

According to the review aggregator Metacritic, The Hunting Party received "generally favorable reviews" based on a weighted average score of 65 out of 100 from 15 critic scores. Dave Simpson of The Guardian gave the album a positive review. Upon giving the album three stars, he praised the band's return to their original sound, stating that "Shinoda's desire to make a punk rock record and Bennington's more ethereal electropop segments don't always make comfortable bedfellows, but Rob Bourdon's terrific drumming means the energy never lets up". Despite labeling some tracks of the record like "Until It's Gone" as cliché, he commented positively on the music and writing of others such as "Drawbar" and "Rebellion". He further wrote, "Linkin Park certainly know their audience, and here delicately navigate the gulf between their own aspirations and a fanbase who will celebrate the band's loud return to rocking hard." Chris Schulz of The New Zealand Herald also gave the album a positive review, describing the record as "Loud, spontaneous and free", attributes that, he states, "aren't normally associated with Linkin Park, but The Hunting Party takes just seconds to prove the sixth release from the Californian precision-metal act is a different beast". He continues to compare the album with the band's recent discography, describing their previous three albums as having "sagged with overwrought ballads and pretentious soft-rock", while The Hunting Party "gets on with the task of rap-rocking like it's 1999 all over again."

David Renshaw at NME opined that "It might not kill the Mumford and Butler clones, but The Hunting Party is an energetic effort at least." Renshaw also praises Daron Malakian's guest spot, but considers Tom Morello's contribution a disappointment. AllMusic reviewer Stephen Thomas Erlewine observes "Far from sounding as if they're grasping at straws, Linkin Park seem rejuvenated, proving there is value in the cliché of returning to roots." Dan Epstein from Revolver described the album as "...not only the hardest and heaviest thing they've ever released, but it's also their first album to pack the sort of guitar firepower that would actually appeal to your average headbanger." Epstein concludes by stating that it's proof that bands don't need to get softer in order to mature. At Billboard, Kenneth Partridge states "...these Cali rap-rock commandos go rogue, flinging missiles in all directions. They attack record companies, politicians, rule makers, exes, and anyone else in sight, all the while rediscovering the savage fun of super-loud guitars." Neil McCormick from The Daily Telegraph stated "...it is sleek, exciting and committed enough to suggest there is life in the rock beast yet." Jordan Blum at PopMatters rated it a 5/10, describing it as a "solid album", but considers it "too repetitive, uninspired, and generic", compared to the three previous albums. Rolling Stone reviewer Jon Dolan states that "on Album Six they're back with a retro-neo-aggro sound that would've been too intense for modern-rock radio in 1999...these dudes can still bring it like backward-ball-cap warriors hopped up on Mountain Dew and Dad's fourth divorce."

=== Accolades ===
The Hunting Party was featured in a number of year end "best of" lists. The album also was nominated for the "2014 Rock Album of the Year" by Loudwire, but lost to "Islander"'s Violence & Destruction by a close margin of 0.29% of votes. Whereas the band won the "Best Rock Band of 2014" and "Best Live Act of 2014". The song Rebellion from the album got a nomination for "2014 Rock Song of the Year" where it lost to Three Days Grace's "Painkiller".

Publication	Country	Accolade	Year	Rank
Kerrang!	UK	The Top 50 Rock Albums of 2014	2014	36
Loudwire	United States	The Best Rock Albums of 2014	2014	19
Revolver	United States	The Best Albums of 2014 – So Far	2014	20
Revolver	United States	The 20 Best Albums of 2014	2014	4

== Commercial performance ==
The album debuted at number three on the US Billboard 200 behind Lana Del Rey's Ultraviolence and Sam Smith's In the Lonely Hour, with first-week sales of 110,000 copies in the United States. Although it was the first week of 2014 where three albums sold more than 100,000 copies in the United States, it became Linkin Park's lowest-peaking studio album and their first to not reach number one since Hybrid Theory. In its second week, the album dropped to number nine on the chart, selling 29,000 copies. In its third week, the album sold 16,000 more copies, bringing its total album sales to 155,000 in the United States. As of December 2014, the album had sold 231,150 copies in the United States. Despite its slow sales, the album was certified Platinum in the US, in December 2017.

== Track listing ==
All tracks are written by Linkin Park, except where noted.

The Hunting Party track listing
No.	Title	Writer(s)	Length
1.	"Keys to the Kingdom"		3:38
2.	"All for Nothing" (featuring Page Hamilton)		3:33
3.	"Guilty All the Same" (featuring Rakim)	Linkin Park; William Griffin	5:55
4.	"The Summoning"		1:00
5.	"War"		2:11
6.	"Wastelands"		3:15
7.	"Until It's Gone"		3:53
8.	"Rebellion" (featuring Daron Malakian)	Linkin Park; Daron Malakian	3:44
9.	"Mark the Graves"		5:05
10.	"Drawbar" (featuring Tom Morello)		2:46
11.	"Final Masquerade"	Linkin Park; Emile Haynie	3:37
12.	"A Line in the Sand"		6:35
Total length:			45:12

The Hunting Party Xbox deluxe edition live bonus tracks
No.	Title	Writer(s)	Length
13.	"With You" (live at Home Depot Center)	Bennington; Bourdon; Delson; Hahn; Shinoda; Michael Simpson; John King	3:42
14.	"Lost in the Echo" (live at Home Depot Center)		3:57
15.	"Numb" (live at Home Depot Center)		3:17
16.	"Burn It Down" (live at Home Depot Center)		3:57
Total length:			60:09

Bonus DVD ─ The Hunting Party: Live from Mexico^{[a]}
No.	Title	Writer(s)	Length
1.	"Intro"		2:31
2.	"A Place for My Head"	Bennington; Bourdon; Delson; Farrell; Hahn; Shinoda; Mark Wakefield	2:49
3.	"New Divide"		4:40
4.	"Somewhere I Belong"		4:16
5.	"Points of Authority"	Bennington; Bourdon; Delson; Hahn; Shinoda	3:21
6.	"Lies Greed Misery"		2:28
7.	"Lost in the Echo"		3:55
8.	"What I've Done"		3:37
9.	"Burn It Down"		3:54
10.	"In the End"	Bennington; Bourdon; Delson; Hahn; Shinoda	3:29
11.	"Bleed It Out"		4:51
12.	"One Step Closer"	Bennington; Bourdon; Delson; Hahn; Shinoda	4:10
Total length:			41:21

All tracks are written by Chester Bennington, Rob Bourdon, Brad Delson, Joe Hahn, Mike Shinoda, except where noted.

Limited digital bundle ─ Hybrid Theory: Live at Download Festival 2014
No.	Title	Writer(s)	Length
1.	"Papercut"		3:13
2.	"One Step Closer"		3:13
3.	"With You"	Bennington; Bourdon; Delson; Hahn; Shinoda; Simpson; King	3:34
4.	"Points of Authority"		5:00
5.	"Crawling"		3:29
6.	"Runaway"	Bennington; Bourdon; Delson; Farrell; Hahn; Shinoda; Wakefield	3:16
7.	"By Myself"		3:24
8.	"In the End"		3:40
9.	"A Place for My Head"	Bennington; Bourdon; Delson; Farrell; Hahn; Shinoda; Wakefield	3:44
10.	"Forgotten"	Bennington; Bourdon; Delson; Farrell; Hahn; Shinoda; Wakefield	3:26
11.	"Cure for the Itch"		2:50
12.	"Pushing Me Away"		3:29

Notes

- ^{^a} Live from Mexico is Linkin Park's 2012 live performance in Monterrey, Mexico, originally recorded for MTV World Stage.

== Personnel ==
Linkin Park

- Chester Bennington – vocals, lyrics
- Mike Shinoda – vocals, rhythm guitar, keyboards, synthesizer, production, engineering, creative director, lyrics
- Brad Delson – lead guitar, backing vocals, production, additional lyrics
- Dave "Phoenix" Farrell – bass guitar, backing vocals
- Joe Hahn – sampling, programming, backing vocals
- Rob Bourdon – drums, percussion, backing vocals

Technical

- Rob Cavallo – co-production on "Wastelands"
- Emile Haynie – co-production on "Final Masquerade"
- Ethan Mates – engineering
- Alejandro Baima – engineering assistance
- Brendan Dekora – additional engineering assistance
- Jennifer Langdon – additional engineering assistance
- Andy Wallace – mixing
- Paul Suarez – Pro Tools engineering
- Del Bowers – Pro Tools engineering assistance
- Ryan DeMarti – production coordination
- Josh Newell – digital editing
- Emily Lazar – mastering
- Rich Morales – mastering assistance
- Jerry Johnson – drum technician
- Brandon Parvini – computer graphics, creative direction
- Rickey Kim – creative direction
- Annie Nguyen – art direction/album packaging design
- James Jean – artwork
- Brandon Cox – photography
- Marc VanGool – guitar and studio technician

Additional musicians

- Page Hamilton – additional vocals and guitar on "All for Nothing"
- Rakim – featured vocals on "Guilty All the Same"
- Daron Malakian – additional guitar on "Rebellion"
- Tom Morello – additional guitar on "Drawbar"

== The Hunting Party (Acapellas + Instrumentals) ==
The Hunting Party (Acapellas + Instrumentals)

Studio album by Linkin Park
- Released: August 12, 2014
- Recorded: May 2013 – April 2014 at; Larrabee Sound Studios, EastWest Studios and Glenwood Place Studios (Los Angeles)
- Length: 86:28
- Labels: Warner Bros.; Machine Shop
- Producers: Mike Shinoda; Brad Delson

The Hunting Party (Acapellas + Instrumentals) is the second instrumental and a cappella tracks album performed by Linkin Park, taken from The Hunting Party. The album was released on iTunes and Amazon on August 12, 2014.

=== Track listing ===
No.	Title	Length
1.	"Keys to the Kingdom" (A cappella)	3:39
2.	"All for Nothing" (featuring Page Hamilton, A cappella)	3:34
3.	"Guilty All the Same" (featuring Rakim, A cappella)	5:54
4.	"War" (A cappella)	2:11
5.	"Wastelands" (A cappella)	3:16
6.	"Until It's Gone" (A cappella)	3:53
7.	"Rebellion" (A cappella)	3:44
8.	"Mark the Graves" (A cappella)	5:04
9.	"Final Masquerade" (A cappella)	3:38
10.	"A Line in the Sand" (A cappella)	6:35
11.	"Keys to the Kingdom" (Instrumental)	3:29
12.	"All for Nothing" (featuring Page Hamilton, Instrumental)	3:14
13.	"Guilty All the Same" (Instrumental)	5:54
14.	"The Summoning" (Instrumental)	1:02
15.	"War" (Instrumental)	2:05
16.	"Wastelands" (Instrumental)	3:18
17.	"Until It's Gone" (Instrumental)	3:41
18.	"Rebellion" (featuring Daron Malakian, Instrumental)	3:45
19.	"Mark the Graves" (Instrumental)	5:02
20.	"Drawbar" (featuring Tom Morello, Instrumental)	3:12
21.	"Final Masquerade" (Instrumental)	3:40
22.	"A Line in the Sand" (Instrumental)	6:38
Total length:		1:26:28

== Charts ==
=== Weekly charts ===
Weekly chart performance for The Hunting Party
Chart (2014)	Peak position
Australian Albums (ARIA)	3
Austrian Albums (Ö3 Austria)	2
Belgian Albums (Ultratop Flanders)	3
Belgian Albums (Ultratop Wallonia)	7
Canadian Albums (Billboard)	3
Czech Albums (ČNS IFPI)	1
Danish Albums (Hitlisten)	4
Dutch Albums (Album Top 100)	8
Finnish Albums (Suomen virallinen lista)	4
French Albums (SNEP)	3
German Albums (Offizielle Top 100)	1
Hungarian Albums (MAHASZ)	1
Indian Albums (IMI)	1
Irish Albums (IRMA)	6
Italian Albums (FIMI)	4
Japanese Albums (Oricon)	4
New Zealand Albums (RMNZ)	2
Norwegian Albums (VG-lista)	11
Polish Albums (ZPAV)	3
Portuguese Albums (AFP)	1
Scottish Albums (Official Charts)	4
South African Albums (RISA)	12
South Korean Albums (Circle)	10
South Korean International Albums (Circle)	2
Spanish Albums (Promusicae)	6
Swedish Albums (Sverigetopplistan)	27
Swiss Albums (Schweizer Hitparade)	1
UK Albums (Official Charts)	2
UK Rock & Metal Albums (Official Charts)	1
US Billboard 200	3
US Top Alternative Albums (Billboard)	1
US Top Hard Rock Albums (Billboard)	1
US Top Rock Albums (Billboard)	1

=== Year-end charts ===
Year-end chart performance for The Hunting Party
Chart (2014)	Position
Australian Albums (ARIA)	77
Austrian Albums (Ö3 Austria)	30
Belgian Albums (Ultratop Flanders)	96
Belgian Albums (Ultratop Wallonia)	92
French Albums (SNEP)	111
German Albums (Offizielle Top 100)	17
Hungarian Albums (MAHASZ)	9
Italian Albums (FIMI)	62
Japanese Albums (Oricon)	60
South Korean International Albums (Gaon)	49
Swiss Albums (Schweizer Hitparade)	18
US Billboard 200	67
US Alternative Albums (Billboard)	10
US Hard Rock Albums (Billboard)	2
US Top Rock Albums (Billboard)	12

== Certifications ==
Certifications for The Hunting Party
Region	Certification	Certified units/sales
Austria (IFPI Austria)	Gold	7,500^{*}
Canada (Music Canada)	Gold	40,000^{^}
Germany (BVMI)	Platinum	200,000^{‡}
Hungary (MAHASZ)	Platinum	2,000^{^}
Italy (FIMI)	Gold	25,000^{‡}
Poland (ZPAV)	Gold	10,000^{*}
Switzerland (IFPI Switzerland)	Gold	10,000^{^}
United Kingdom (BPI)	Gold	100,000^{‡}
United States (RIAA)	Platinum	1,000,000^{‡}
^{*} Sales figures based on certification alone.^{^} Shipments figures based on certification alone.^{‡} Sales+streaming figures based on certification alone.

== Release history ==
Region	Date	Format	Label	Catalog no.
Australia	June 13, 2014	CD	Warner Bros.; Machine Shop	
Australia	June 13, 2014	CD box set	Warner Bros.; Machine Shop	
Australia	June 13, 2014	CD+DVD	Warner Bros.; Machine Shop	
Australia	June 13, 2014	Digital download	Warner Bros.; Machine Shop	
Germany	June 13, 2014	CD	Warner Bros.	
Germany	June 13, 2014	CD+DVD	Warner Bros.	
Germany	June 13, 2014	Digital download	Warner Bros.	
India	June 13, 2014	Digital download	Warner Bros.	
Netherlands	June 13, 2014	CD	Warner Bros.	
Netherlands	June 13, 2014	Digital download	Warner Bros.	
Switzerland	June 13, 2014	CD	Warner Bros.	
Switzerland	June 13, 2014	CD+DVD	Warner Bros.	
Switzerland	June 13, 2014	Digital download	Warner Bros.	
Poland	June 16, 2014	CD	Warner	0093624937593
Poland	June 16, 2014	CD+DVD	Warner	0093624936985
United Kingdom	June 16, 2014	CD	Warner Bros.	
United Kingdom	June 16, 2014	CD+DVD	Warner Bros.	
United Kingdom	June 16, 2014	Digital download	Warner Bros.	
South Korea	June 18, 2014	CD	Warner	WKPD-0326
South Korea	June 18, 2014	CD+DVD	Warner	49369-8
South Korea	June 18, 2014	Digital download	Warner	
India	June 17, 2014	CD	Warner	093624937593
United States	June 17, 2014	CD	Warner Bros.; Machine Shop	
United States	June 17, 2014	CD+DVD	Warner Bros.; Machine Shop	9362-49369-8
United States	June 17, 2014	Digital download	Warner Bros.; Machine Shop	
Germany	August 26, 2014	LP	Warner Bros.	
Poland	August 26, 2014	LP	Warner	0093624935711
United States	October 21, 2014	Vinyl	Warner Bros.; Machine Shop	
