= Final Masquerade =

Single by Linkin Park

from the album The Hunting Party
- Released: June 10, 2014
- Recorded: 2013–14
- Genre: Alternative rock; hard rock
- Length: 3:37
- Label: Warner Bros.; Machine Shop
- Songwriters: Linkin Park; Emile Haynie
- Producers: Brad Delson; Mike Shinoda; Emile Haynie (co.)

Linkin Park singles chronology
"Rebellion" (2014)	"Final Masquerade" (2014)	"Darker Than Blood" (2015)

Music video
- "Final Masquerade" on YouTube

"Final Masquerade" is a song by American rock band Linkin Park. The song was originally recorded by the band for their sixth studio album, The Hunting Party, where it appears as the eleventh track on the album and serves as the fifth and final single. The song premiered on MTV on June 8, 2014. The song was produced by Mike Shinoda and Brad Delson, and co-produced by Emile Haynie.

An acoustic version of the song was released for digital download on February 19, 2015.

== Composition ==
"Final Masquerade" has been described as an alternative rock and a hard rock song. In an article from Metal Hammer, it was explained as "more like A Thousand Suns than Hybrid Theory, which Linkin Park gives at their most controlled, meditative, a slowly unfurling, mid-paced anthem built around simmering keyboards, unfussy, low-tempo beats and palm-muted guitar. The song features one of Chester Bennington's finest vocal performances on the album."

MTV described the song as "a sharp, edgy, lushly harmonic heavy-hitter that falls perfectly in line with Linkin Park’s lengthy string of hulking, hooky hits." In an interview with MTV, Shinoda explained:

"I made some ‘alternative pop’ demos that sounded like they would fit in with what radio is currently playing. But then I came across a blog piece entitled ‘Rock Sucks Right Now And It’s Really Depressing,” he said. “It got me thinking. I ended up writing a response to it, and realized that what I had been working on wasn't really what I wanted to be making."

== Music video ==
The official music video for the song, directed by Mark Pellington, was released on July 29, 2014 for premiere on MTV. A lyric video for the song was released earlier, as it debuted through Linkin Park's official Facebook page and in digital download format on June 10, 2014.

As of April 2026, the music video for "Final Masquerade" has over 140 million views on YouTube.

== Reception ==
In the track-by-track review by Billboard, the song is given a positive response and explained as, "Synths and palm-muted guitars carry the mid-tempo verses into a head-nodding hard rock chorus. With that, another love affair ends in epic fashion, and there's even a big stadium sing-along."

== Accolades ==
The song was voted as the second-best rock song on Kerrang!'s Rock 100 list. The song was placed after another Linkin Park song, "In the End".

== Track listing ==
Digital download
No.	Title	Writer(s)	Producer(s)	Length
1.	"Final Masquerade"	Linkin Park	Brad Delson; Mike Shinoda; Emile Haynie (co.)	3:37

CD
No.	Title	Writer(s)	Producer(s)	Length
1.	"Final Masquerade"	Linkin Park	Brad Delson; Mike Shinoda; Emile Haynie (co.)	3:37
2.	"Until It's Gone" (Live)	Linkin Park	Brad Delson; Mike Shinoda	3:50

Promotional single
No.	Title	Writer(s)	Length
1.	"Final Masquerade" (Acoustic)	Linkin Park	3:50

== Personnel ==
Linkin Park

- Chester Bennington – lead vocals
- Rob Bourdon – drums, percussion
- Brad Delson – lead guitar, backing vocals
- Dave "Phoenix" Farrell – bass guitar, backing vocals
- Joe Hahn ("Mr. Hahn") - samples, programming
- Mike Shinoda – backing vocals, rhythm guitar, keyboards

== Charts ==
Chart performance for "Final Masquerade"
Chart (2014)	Peak position
Australia (ARIA)	43
Austria (Ö3 Austria Top 40)	65
Belgium (Ultratop 50 Flanders)	44
Belgium (Ultratop 50 Wallonia)	46
Canada Hot 100 (Billboard)	85
Czech Republic Airplay (ČNS IFPI)	74
Denmark (Tracklisten)	34
France (SNEP)	45
Germany (GfK)	70
Hungary (Single Top 40)	5
Italy (FIMI)	34
New Zealand (Recorded Music NZ)	30
Portugal (AFP)	22
Spain (Promusicae)	35
Switzerland (Schweizer Hitparade)	64
UK Singles (OCC)	106
UK Rock & Metal (OCC)	2
US Bubbling Under Hot 100 (Billboard)	15
US Digital Song Sales (Billboard)	47
US Hot Rock & Alternative Songs (Billboard)	18
US Rock & Alternative Airplay (Billboard)	30
US Alternative Airplay (Billboard)	32
US Mainstream Rock (Billboard)	35

== Release history ==
Release dates and formats for "Final Masquerade"
Region	Date	Format	Label	Ref.
Worldwide	June 10, 2014	Digital download	Warner Bros.; Machine Shop	
India	June 10, 2014	Digital download	Warner Bros.	
Italy	August 1, 2014	Contemporary hit radio	Warner Bros.	
Germany	September 20, 2014	CD	Warner Bros.	
United States	November 11, 2014	Modern rock radio	Warner Bros.; Machine Shop	
Worldwide	February 21, 2015	Promotional single	Warner Bros.; Machine Shop	
