= Until It's Gone (Linkin Park song) =

Single by Linkin Park

from the album The Hunting Party
- Released: May 6, 2014
- Recorded: 2013–2014
- Genre: Alternative rock; electronic rock; gothic rock
- Length: 3:53 (album version); 3:41 (single version)
- Label: Warner Bros.; Machine Shop
- Songwriter: Linkin Park
- Producers: Mike Shinoda; Brad Delson

Linkin Park singles chronology
"Guilty All the Same" (2014)	"Until It's Gone" (2014)	"Wastelands" (2014)

Alternative cover
- CD cover

Music video
- "Until It's Gone" on YouTube

"Until It's Gone" is a song written by American rock band Linkin Park. The song was originally recorded by the band for their sixth studio album, The Hunting Party, where it appears as the seventh track on the album. Produced by Mike Shinoda and Brad Delson, the track also appears on the single of the same name, which was released by Warner Bros. Records and Machine Shop on May 6, 2014. The single is the second to be released in promotion of The Hunting Party. The single is also included in the music for the action-adventure video game Transformers: Rise of the Dark Spark, which was released on June 24, 2014.

== Background and release ==
"Until It's Gone"
"Until it's Gone" features experimental rock-centric sounds that would otherwise differ from the band's earlier works.

In a preview for the album by Rolling Stone, the song was explained as, "Until It's Gone" kicks off with the sort of warbling synth effect that was the group's calling card on their 2000 breakthrough debut, Hybrid Theory, but builds into a brooding, textured gloom rocker that reminds listeners, via singer Chester Bennington, that "[you] don't know what you've got until it's gone." In another preview by Loudwire the single is explained as "it's a more mid-tempo track with softer lyrics provided by Chester Bennington, who really shows his vocal versatility. The dreamy and atmospheric sounds are enough to whisk you away but Bennington brings you back down to earth as he belts out their take on a familiar chorus." The song continues its outro into The Hunting Party's eighth track and fourth single, "Rebellion" with System of a Down guitarist, Daron Malakian.

== Composition ==
"Until It's Gone" is described to be an alternative rock, electronic rock and gothic rock song. Lyrically, the song is about a failed relationship lead vocalist Chester Bennington has been in. AltWire explains it as a "beginning with a synth line similar to 'Numb' from the 2003 album Meteora, taking a sharp turn to an unexpected brooding goth rock anthem, proving to be one of the songs on the 6-track sampler of The Hunting Party in recent memory with a choir-like backing vocals and intense orchestral backdrops that stays and impacts after 'it's gone.'"

== Reception ==
In a track-by-track review by Billboard, the song was given a positive response and explained as "So returns the warped sonar synth effect heard on hits like 'Numb', and while it arrives in the opening seconds amid a rush of heavy guitars, 'Until It's Gone' quickly turns into a philosophical electro-rock mood piece. The buildup of blips in the bridge hints at a coming bass drop, but then the guitars kick back in, and Bennington belts out his clichéd lyrics for the middle schoolers in the cheap seats who don't know any better."

== Music video ==
A lyric video to accompany the track was premiered on YouTube on May 5, 2014. Directed by Austin Saya, the three-minute video was shot in Los Angeles, California. An official music video was then released on June 11, 2014, directed by Joe Hahn. The video was premiered on the band's official Facebook page, and is now uploaded on their official YouTube channel. The video received a nomination at MTV Video Music Awards 2014 in the category for "Best Rock Video".

As of May 2025, the music video for "Until It's Gone" has over 48 million views on YouTube.

== Track listing ==
Digital download
No.	Title	Writer(s)	Producer(s)	Length
1.	"Until It's Gone"	Linkin Park	Brad Delson; Mike Shinoda	3:41

CD (B00K7N2I00)
No.	Title	Writer(s)	Producer(s)	Length
1.	"Until It's Gone"	Linkin Park	Delson; Shinoda	3:41
2.	"Guilty All the Same" (featuring Rakim)	Linkin Park; William Griffin	Delson; Shinoda	5:55
Total length:				9:36

== Personnel ==
Linkin Park

- Chester Bennington – lead vocals
- Mike Shinoda – backing vocals, rhythm guitar, keyboards
- Brad Delson – lead guitar
- Dave "Phoenix" Farrell – bass guitar, backing vocals
- Joe Hahn – sampling, programming
- Rob Bourdon – drums, percussion

Technical personnel

- Ethan Mates – engineering

== Charts ==
=== Weekly charts ===
Weekly chart performance for "Until It's Gone"
Chart (2014)	Peak position
Australia (ARIA)	58
Austria (Ö3 Austria Top 40)	33
Belgium (Ultratop 50 Flanders)	84
Canada Rock (Billboard)	39
Czech Republic Airplay (ČNS IFPI)	22
France (SNEP)	104
Germany (GfK)	24
Scotland (OCC)	71
Switzerland (Schweizer Hitparade)	23
UK Singles (OCC)	78
UK Rock & Metal (OCC)	1
US Bubbling Under Hot 100 (Billboard)	15
US Hot Rock & Alternative Songs (Billboard)	17
US Rock & Alternative Airplay (Billboard)	16

=== Year-end charts ===
Year-end chart performance for "Until It's Gone"
Chart (2014)	Position
US Hot Rock & Alternative Songs (Billboard)	75
US Rock & Alternative Airplay (Billboard)	45

== Release history ==
Release dates and formats for "Until It's Gone"
Region	Date	Format	Label	Ref.
Worldwide	May 6, 2014	Digital download	Warner Bros.	
India	May 6, 2014	Digital download	Warner Bros.	
Italy	May 9, 2014	Contemporary hit radio	Warner Bros.	
United States	May 13, 2014	Modern rock radio	Warner Bros.; Machine Shop	
Germany	May 30, 2014	CD	Warner Bros.	
Switzerland	May 30, 2014	CD	Warner Bros.	
