= Guilty All the Same =

Single by Linkin Park featuring Rakim

from the album The Hunting Party
- Released: March 7, 2014
- Genre: Heavy metal; hard rock; rap metal
- Length: 5:55 (album version); 3:52 (radio edit)
- Label: Warner Bros.; Machine Shop
- Songwriters: Linkin Park; William Griffin
- Producers: Brad Delson; Mike Shinoda

Linkin Park singles chronology
"A Light That Never Comes" (2013)	"Guilty All the Same" (2014)	"Until It's Gone" (2014)

Rakim singles chronology
"Walk These Streets" (2009)	"Guilty All the Same" (2014)

Music video
- "Guilty All the Same" on YouTube "Guilty All the Same" (lyric video) on YouTube

"Guilty All the Same" is a song by American rock band Linkin Park. The song was recorded by the band for their sixth studio album The Hunting Party, serving as both the lead single and third track. The track features American rapper Rakim. The track premiered on March 6, 2014, on commercial mobile service Shazam, and was released as a single by Warner Bros. Records on March 7, 2014. The song was self-produced after the band decided not to have a producer for the album.

== Composition ==
"Guilty All the Same"
A 30 second sample of the second verse and chorus of "Guilty All the Same".

In an interview with Radio.com, Shinoda and Bennington explained that this song "...seemed like the perfect song to reintroduce the band."

"A few months ago I was making some demos and writing this stuff and it sounded like something that you could play on the radio," Shinoda explained. "I listen to a lot of indie music… and I was listening to the demos and thought, I don't want to make any of that music. What is it that's not out there right now that I'm all about, that I'm fired up about that is a void? It ended up being this new material."

In that same interview, regarding the addition of Rakim, Shinoda wanted to surprise people and was "spitballing" the idea of getting Rakim, one of Shinoda's idols growing up, on the track. When the band's engineer revealed that he knew one of Rakim's people, he reached out to him, leading to Rakim coming over to the studio and, according to Bennington, "crush that section" (verse over the bridge). Shinoda was originally going to rap in the bridge off the song, but thought that it would be too predictable and wanted another rapper to do it instead, and managed to get into contact with Rakim through their musical engineer.

The track features a long instrumental intro and is driven by aggressive guitars and drums, with lead singer Chester Bennington using angsty yet clean vocals, while guest rapper Rakim raps his own verse over a hip hop-tinged bridge. Alternatively, it has been described as demonstrating a rap metal style similar to that of the band's earlier albums, Hybrid Theory and Meteora by Music Feeds. It has also been described as a return to their hard rock and heavy metal roots for the band by Zach McEntire of KXRK. Al Kooper observed it as "plain old heavy metal".

== Reception ==
Tarun Mazumdar of International Business Times gave the song a positive review, claiming "the vocals nicely complement the entire instrumentation", and praises Rakim's rapping during the breakdown. Andy Walsh at Renowned for Sound gave the song 3.5 stars out of 5 stars, calling the heaviness of the song a "welcome return". He concludes with hoping it's a sign for things to come. In the track by track review by Billboard, the song is given a positive response and explained as "The fellas are justifiably psyched to have hip-hop legend Rakim on this track, so they preface his arrival with more than a minute of dramatic guitar buildup. At first, the bobbing and weaving riffage suggests a boxer readying for the bell, but then the group segues into quasi-symphonic metal mode, and we're galloping into Bennington's verses."

== Music video ==
The music video for "Guilty All the Same" is a collaboration between Linkin Park and Microsoft's Project Spark, giving the fans the opportunity of editing it and remixing it as they will. In Linkin Park's version of the game, the protagonist is a character haunted by guilt. The player navigates the character through a dark, slightly sinister environment that threatens to devour him as he tries to flee from the forces of his own guilt. The level resembles a mashup between the racing mechanic of Temple Run and the noir art style of Badland. The better the player performs, the richer the soundtrack for the song.

As of May 2025, the music video for "Guilty All the Same" has over 5.5 million views on YouTube.

== Track listing ==
Digital download
No.	Title	Writer(s)	Producer(s)	Length
1.	"Guilty All the Same" (featuring Rakim)	Linkin Park; William Griffin	Brad Delson; Mike Shinoda	5:55

US promotional single
No.	Title	Writer(s)	Producer(s)	Length
1.	"Guilty All the Same" (radio edit)	Linkin Park; Griffin	Delson; Shinoda	3:52

UK promotional CD single
No.	Title	Writer(s)	Producer(s)	Length
1.	"Guilty All the Same" (featuring Rakim, album version)	Linkin Park; Griffin	Delson; Shinoda	5:55
2.	"Guilty All the Same" (shorter edit)	Linkin Park; Griffin	Delson; Shinoda	3:53

== Personnel ==
=== Linkin Park ===
- Chester Bennington – lead vocals
- Mike Shinoda – piano, rhythm guitar, keyboards, programming
- Brad Delson – lead guitar, programming
- Rob Bourdon – drums, percussion
- Dave "Phoenix" Farrell – bass guitar, backing vocals
- Joe Hahn ("Mr. Hahn") – samples, programming

=== Additional musicians ===
- Rakim – rap vocals

== Charts ==
=== Weekly charts ===
Weekly chart performance
Chart (2014)	Peak position
Austria (Ö3 Austria Top 40)	48
Canada Rock (Billboard)	23
Finland Airplay (Radiosoittolista)	53
France (SNEP)	116
Germany (GfK)	32
Switzerland (Schweizer Hitparade)	50
UK Singles (OCC)	138
UK Rock & Metal (OCC)	3
US Bubbling Under Hot 100 Singles (Billboard)	17
US Hot Rock & Alternative Songs (Billboard)	19
US Rock Airplay (Billboard)	8

=== Year-end charts ===
Year-end chart performance
Chart (2014)	Position
US Hot Rock & Alternative Songs (Billboard)	54
US Rock Airplay (Billboard)	31

== Release history ==
Release dates and formatS
Region	Date	Format	Label	Ref.
United States	March 7, 2014	Digital download	Warner Bros.; Machine Shop	
India	March 7, 2014	Digital download	Warner Bros.	
Italy	March 7, 2014	Contemporary hit radio	Warner Bros.	
United Kingdom	March 7, 2014	CD single promo	Warner Bros.	
