= List of songs recorded by Linkin Park =

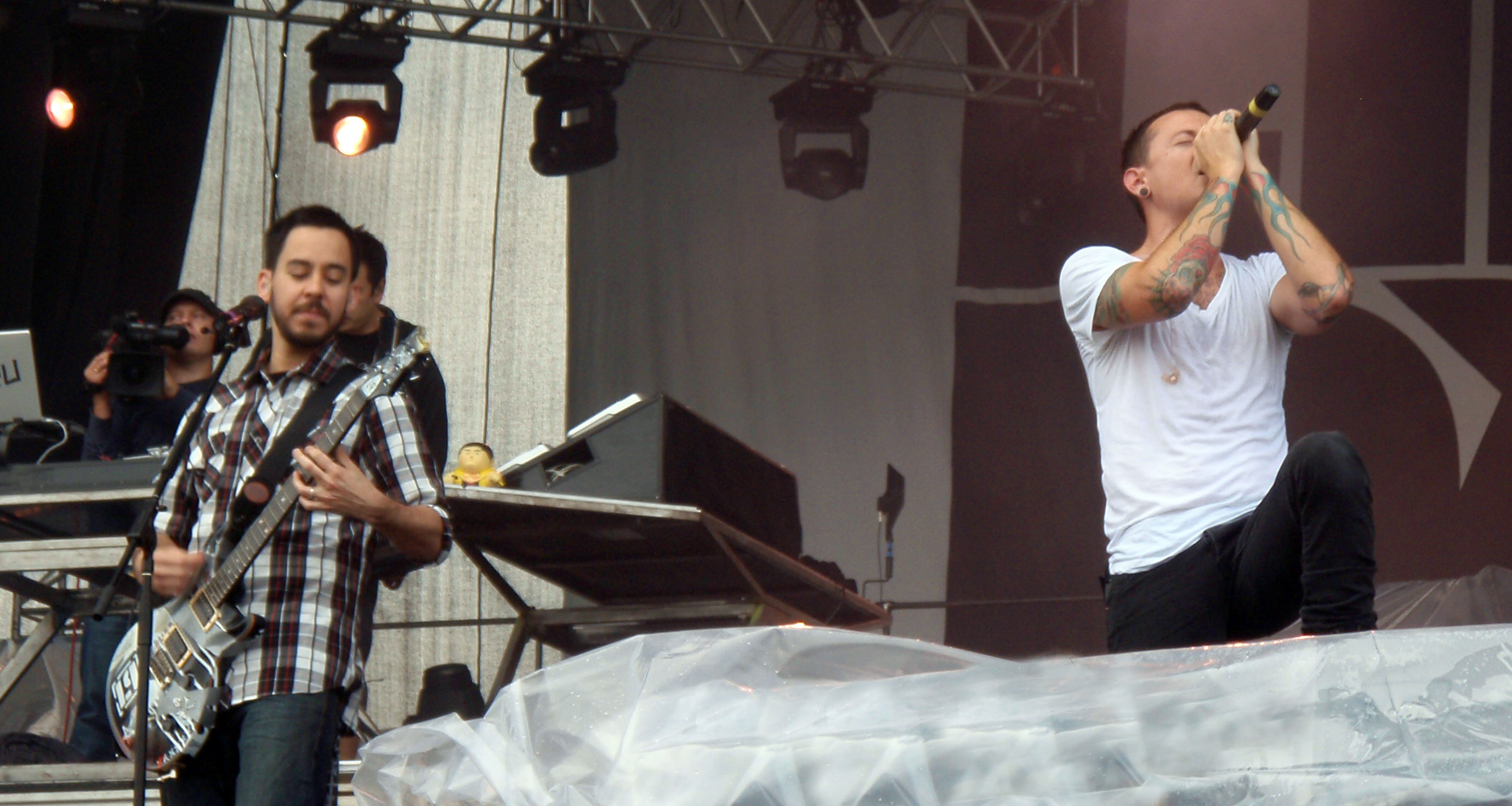
Linkin Park performing at Sonisphere Festival 2009

American rock band Linkin Park has recorded material for eight studio albums, the most recent being From Zero, in 2024. The band was formed in Los Angeles, California in 1996 by high school friends Mike Shinoda, Rob Bourdon and Brad Delson. The group soon expanded into a six-piece when they added Joe Hahn, Dave "Phoenix" Farrell and Mark Wakefield to the line-up. Mark Wakefield was replaced by lead vocalist Chester Bennington prior to the release of the Hybrid Theory EP. After facing numerous rejections from several major record labels, Linkin Park turned to Jeff Blue for additional help. After failing to catch Warner Bros. Records attention on three previous attempts, Jeff Blue, now the vice president of Warner Bros. Records, helped the band sign a deal with the company in 1999. The band released its breakthrough album, Hybrid Theory, the following year. The album spawned four singles, "One Step Closer", "Crawling", "Papercut", and "In the End". The album included a total of twelve songs, with two additional special edition tracks available in Japan. Later in 2002, the band released a remix album, Reanimation, which would include works from Hybrid Theory and non-album tracks. Reanimation debuted on July 30, 2002, featuring the likes of Black Thought, Jonathan Davis, Aaron Lewis and many others. Reanimation claimed the second spot on the Billboard 200 and sold nearly 270,000 copies during its debut week. The remix album included twenty remixed songs, mainly hip hop-influenced.

Following the success of the two releases, the band released Meteora in early 2003. Meteora spawned five singles, "Somewhere I Belong", "Faint", "Numb", "From the Inside" and "Breaking the Habit", which received significant radio attention. The album included twelve songs which included some non-single hits like "Session" and "Lying from You". "Lying from You" peaked on the Alternative Songs charts. "Session", an instrumental track from the album, was nominated for a Grammy Award for Best Rock Instrumental Performance in 2004. The band then released a mashup CD/DVD set, "Collision Course", with rapper Jay-Z on November 30, 2004. It reached number 1 on the Billboard 200 upon its release. The extended set contained six songs recorded overnight. The song "Dirt off Your Shoulder/Lying from You", being a non-single, charted in the UK single charts. Linkin Park returned to the recording studios in 2006 to work on new material. To produce the album, the band chose producer Rick Rubin. Despite initially stating the album would debut sometime in 2006, it was delayed until 2007. Warner Bros. Records officially announced that the band's third studio album, Minutes to Midnight, would be released on May 15, 2007 in the United States. After spending fourteen months working on the album, the band members opted to further refine their album by removing five of the original seventeen tracks. Minutes to Midnight sold over 625,000 copies in its first week, making it one of the most successful debut-week albums in recent years. The album also took the top spot on the Billboard charts. The album included the singles "What I've Done", "Shadow of the Day", "Bleed It Out", "Given Up" and "Leave Out All the Rest". The album contained politically-concerned and environmentally-concerned songs such as "Hands Held High", "No More Sorrow" and "What I've Done".

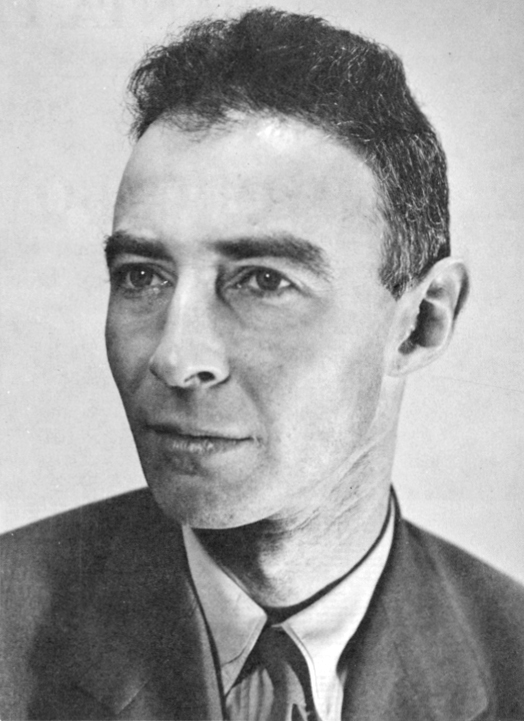
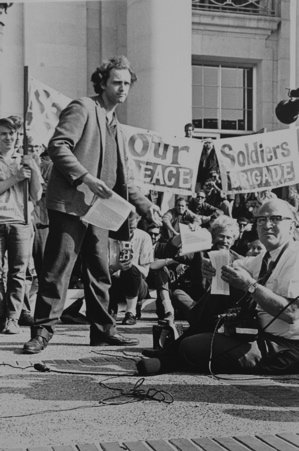
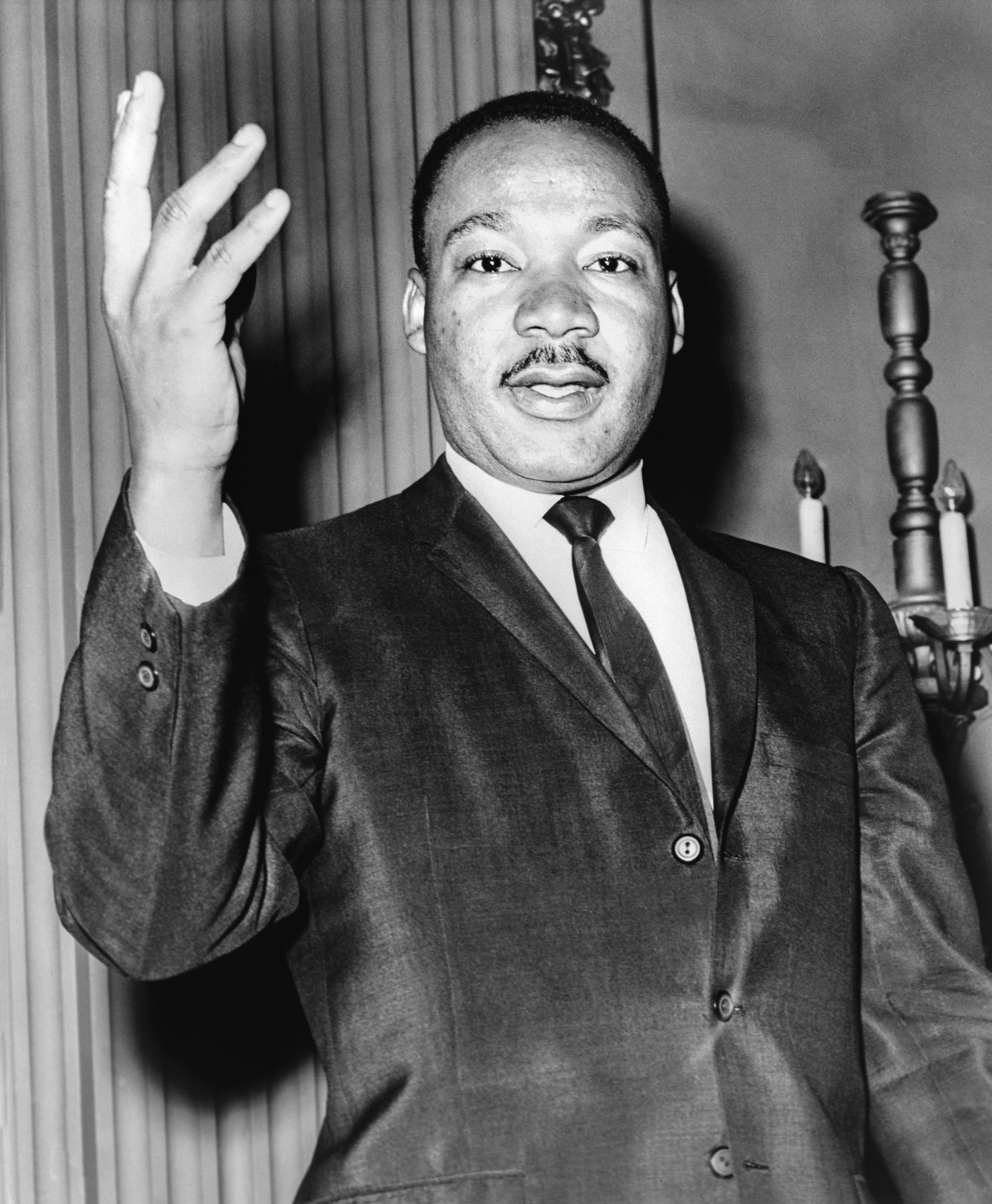
Samples of notable speeches of (left to right) J. Robert Oppenheimer, Mario Savio and Martin Luther King Jr. were used in A Thousand Suns.

In May 2009, Linkin Park announced they were working on a fourth studio album, which was planned to be released in 2010. Mike Shinoda told IGN that the new album would be 'genre-busting', while building off of elements in Minutes to Midnight. He also mentioned that the album would be more experimental and "hopefully more cutting-edge". Chester Bennington also addressed the media to confirm Rick Rubin would return to produce the new album. The band later revealed that the album would be called A Thousand Suns. While working on the new album, Linkin Park worked with film composer Hans Zimmer to produce the score for Transformers: Revenge of the Fallen. The band released a single for the movie, titled "New Divide". Joe Hahn created a music video for the song, featuring clips from the film. On June 22, Linkin Park played a short set in Westwood Village after the premier of the movie. After completing work for Transformers: Revenge of the Fallen, the band returned to the studio to finalize their album. The album featured four singles, "The Catalyst", "Waiting for the End", "Burning in the Skies" and "Iridescent". For the next album, the band again started recording in 2011, and the album Living Things was released in June 2012. The album sold about 223,000 copies during its debut week, reaching No. 1 on the US Album Charts. Linkin Park's single "Castle of Glass" was nominated for 'Best Song in a Game' at the 2012 Spike Video Game Awards. The band also performed at the award ceremony on December 7 but lost the award to "Cities" by Beck. The album featured four singles, "Burn It Down", "Lost in the Echo", "Powerless" and "Castle of Glass". On August 10, 2013, the band collaborated with American musician Steve Aoki to record the song "A Light That Never Comes" for Linkin Park's online puzzle-action game LP Recharge (short for Linkin Park Recharge), which was launched on Facebook and the official LP Recharge website on September 12, 2013. On the day of the game's release, Linkin Park made a post on their Facebook explaining that the song used to promote the game would be included on a new remix album, Recharged. The band also worked on the soundtrack for the film Mall, which was directed by Joe Hahn.

In 2014, the band released an album, The Hunting Party, which features a more raw and loud sound compared to their other albums. The album is the first one to have featuring artists like Page Hamilton of Helmet, Rakim, Daron Malakian of System of a Down and Tom Morello of Rage Against the Machine. The album spawned five singles, "Guilty All the Same", "Until It's Gone", "Wastelands", "Rebellion" and "Final Masquerade".

In 2017, the band released their most recent album One More Light, which features a drastic sound change. The album was described as pop, pop rock, electropop, and electronic rock. The album features Pusha T, Stormzy, and Kiiara. The album spawned three singles, "Heavy", "Talking to Myself", and "One More Light". This is the last album to feature lead singer Chester Bennington before his death in July 2017, and drummer Rob Bourdon, who would depart the band prior to their 2024 reunion.

The band reformed in 2024 with the addition of Emily Armstrong as lead vocalist and Colin Brittain as the band's drummer. The eighth Linkin Park album, From Zero, was released on November 15, 2024, with four new singles: "The Emptiness Machine", "Heavy Is the Crown", "Over Each Other", and "Two Faced". Two further singles "Up From the Bottom" and "Unshatter" were released leading up to the release of the deluxe edition of the album on May 16, 2025.

== Songs ==
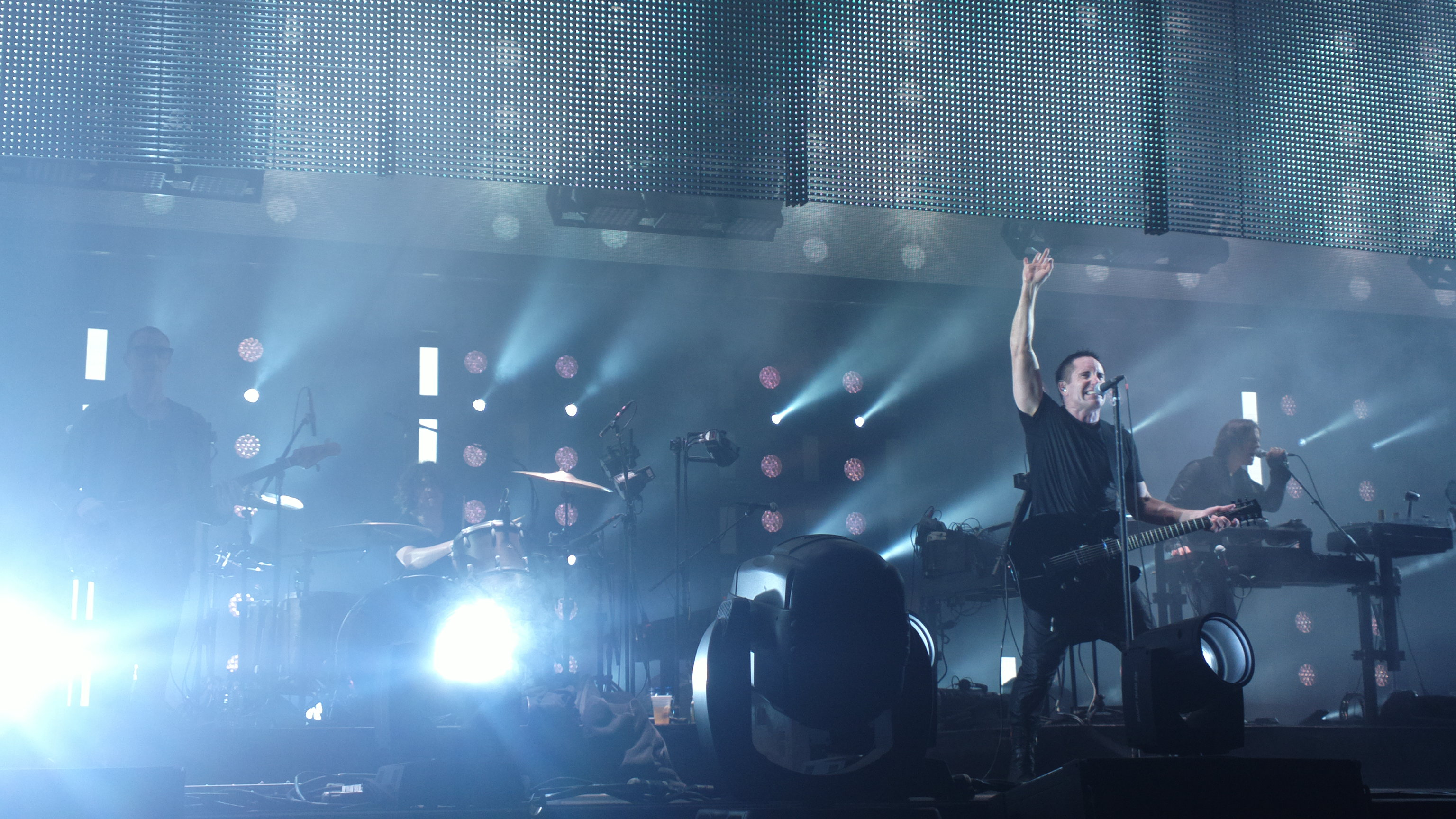
Linkin Park covered the song "Wish" by Nine Inch Nails, which appears on LP Underground 4.0.

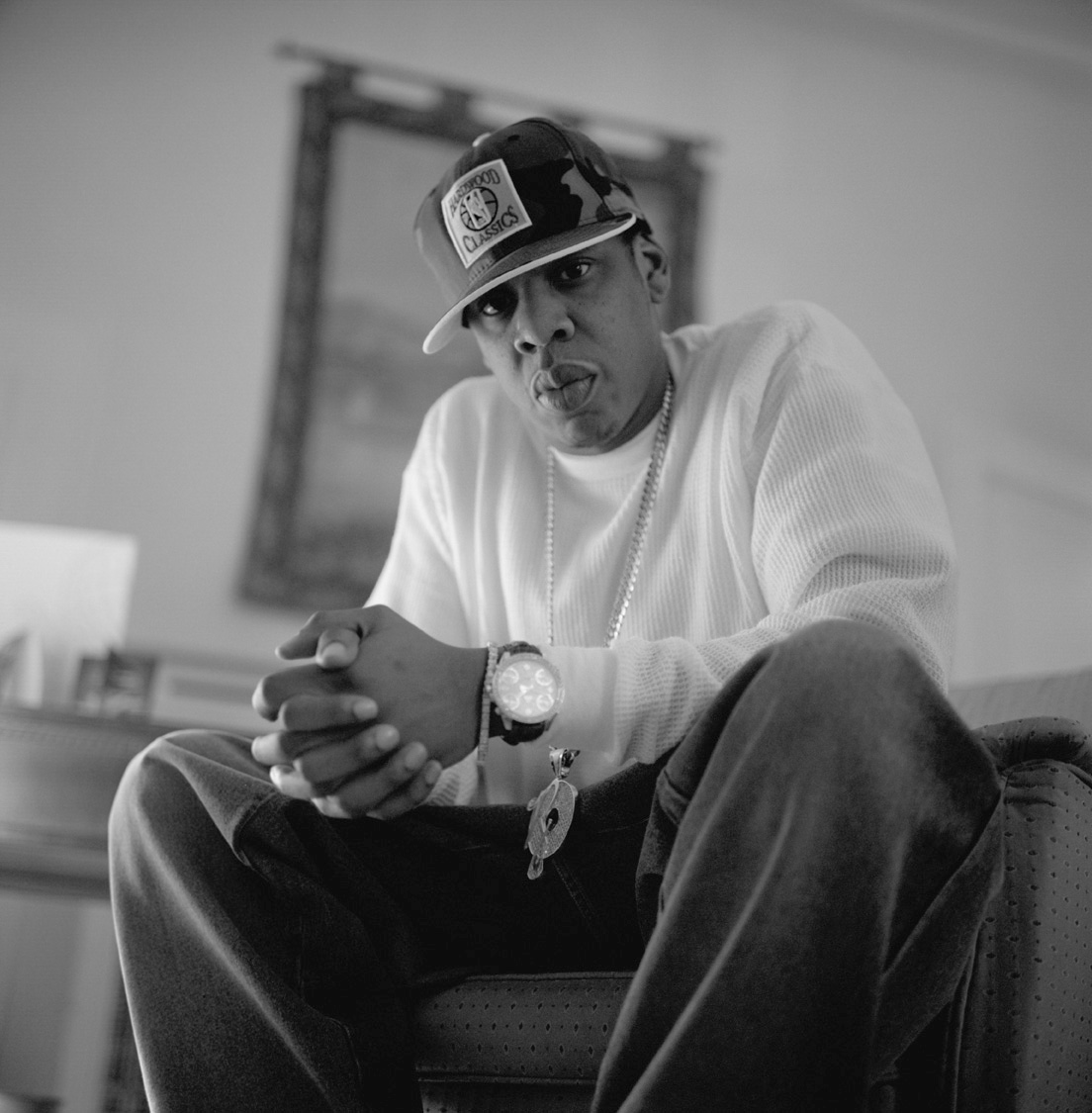
Linkin Park and Jay-Z recorded a mashup EP Collision Course.

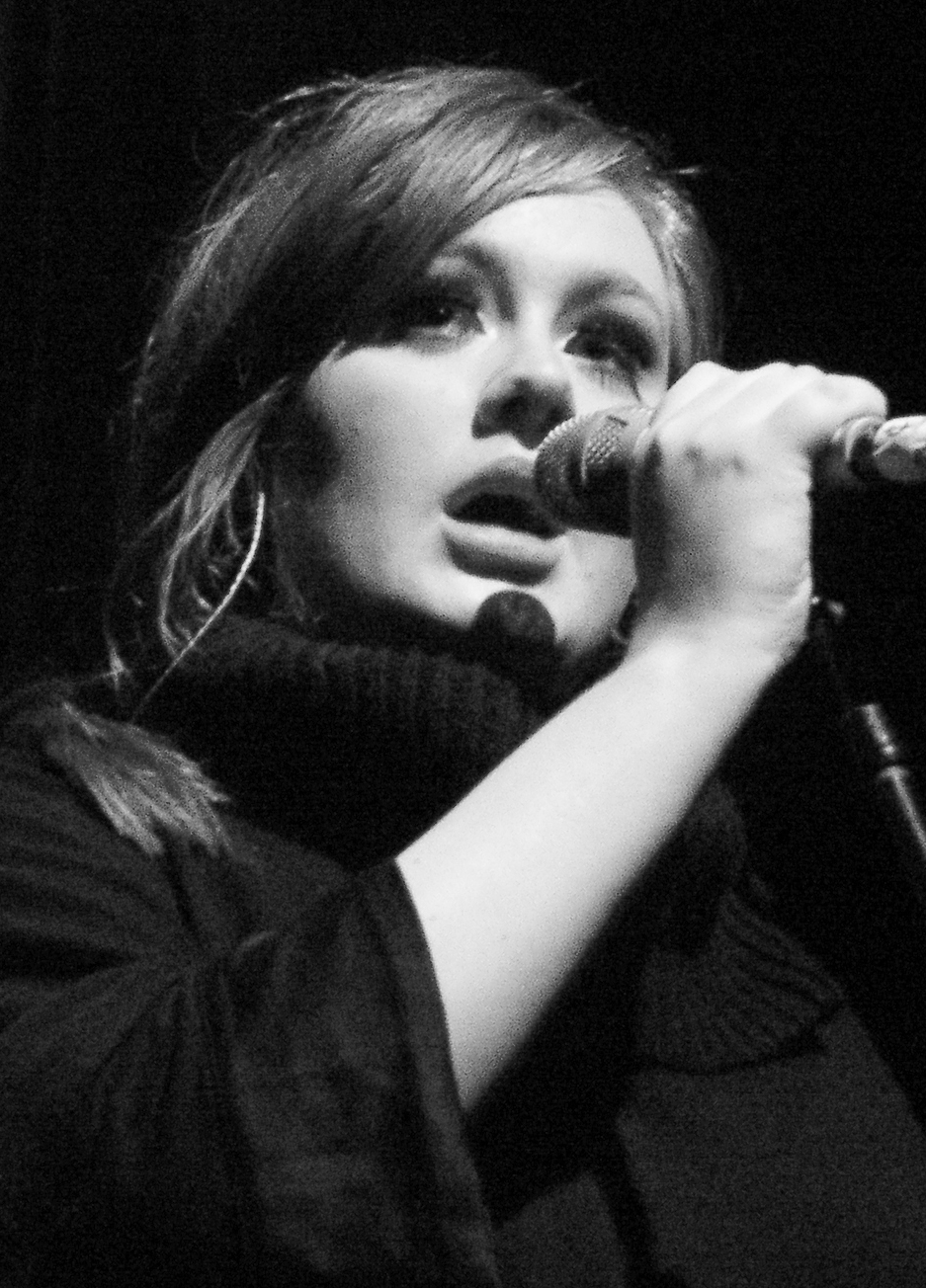
Linkin Park covered the song "Rolling in the Deep" by Adele which appears on iTunes Festival.

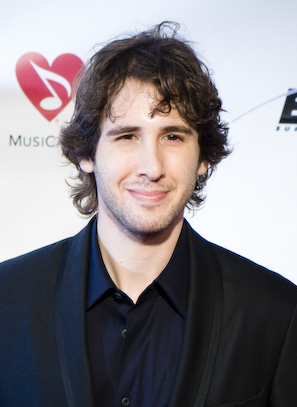
Josh Groban covered the song "My December" by Linkin Park which appears on Closer.

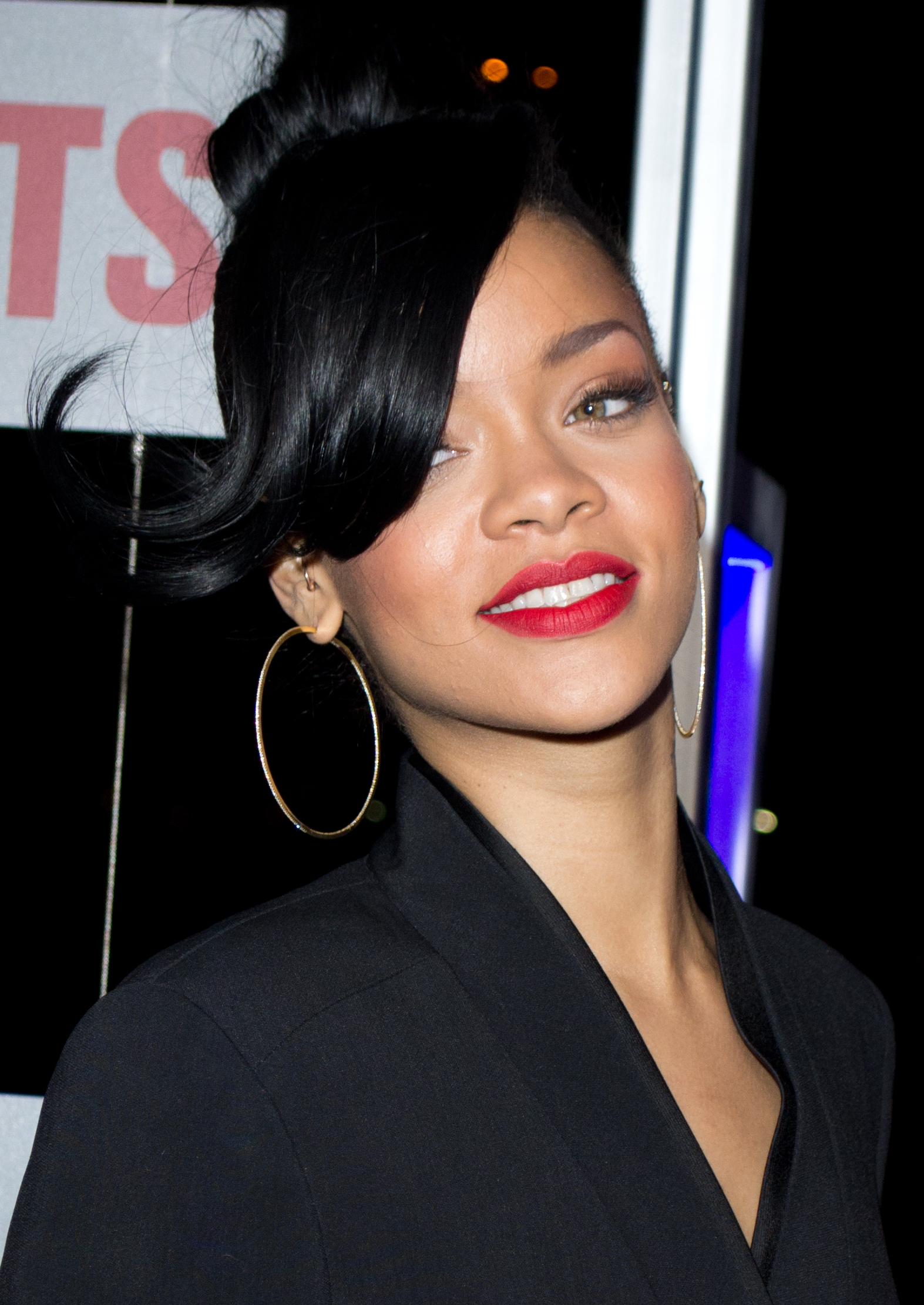
Mike Shinoda of the band covered the song "Umbrella" by Rihanna.

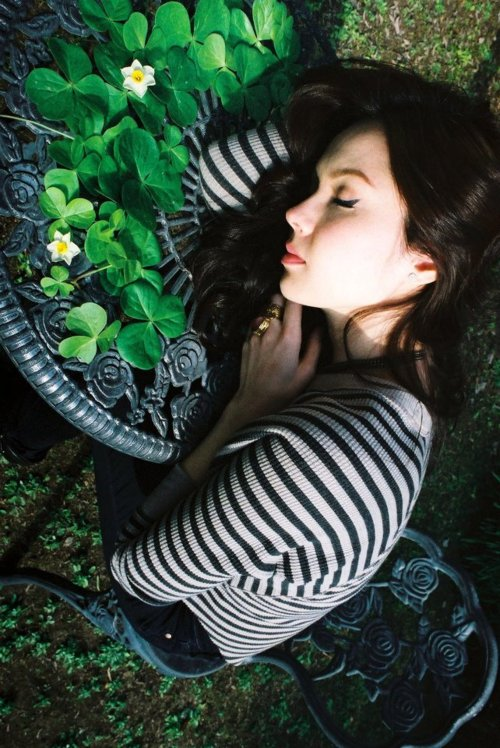
Marié Digby covered the song "What I've Done" by Linkin Park which appears on Start Here.

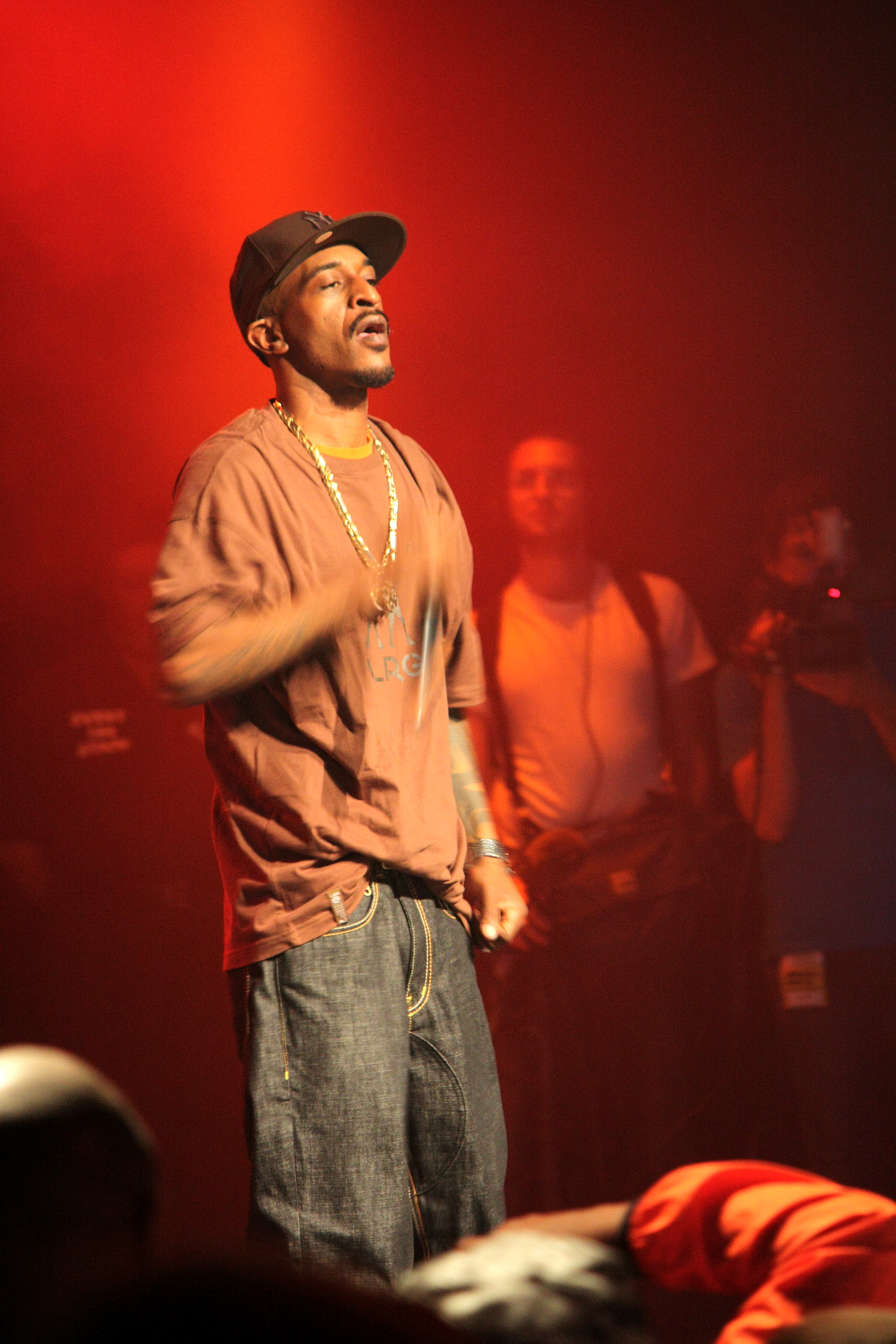
American rapper Rakim from the hip hop duo Eric B. & Rakim co-wrote the song "Guilty All the Same" and gave featuring vocals on it.

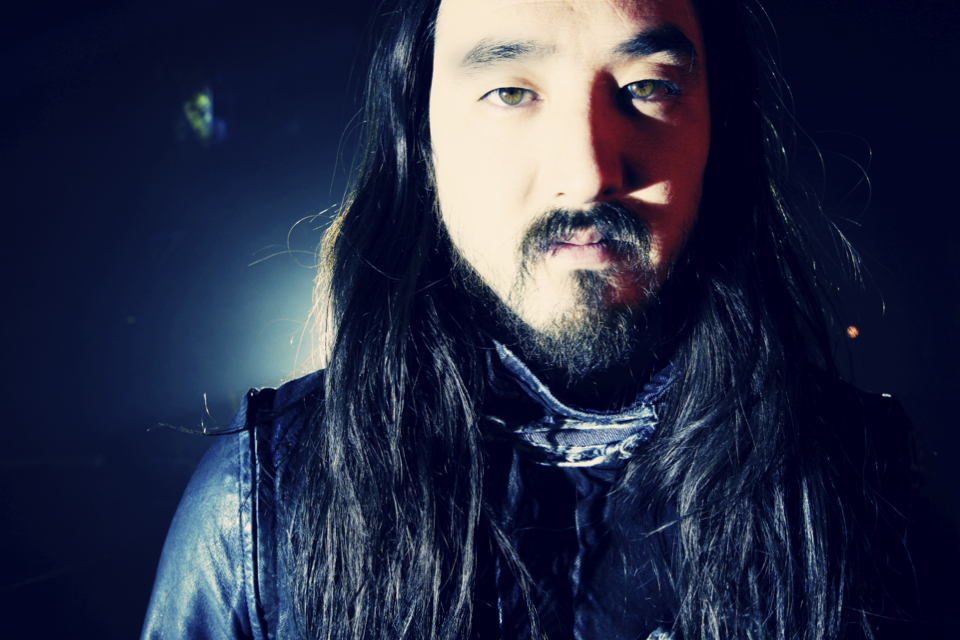
American electro house musician Steve Aoki collaborated with the band on the singles "A Light That Never Comes" and "Darker Than Blood".

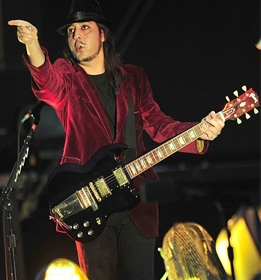
Armenian-American musician Daron Malakian from rock band System of a Down co-wrote the single "Rebellion" and provided additional guitar on the song.

Key
†	Indicates single release
#	Indicates promotional single release

Year	Title	Album	Writer(s)
1997	Dialate	Xero (Sampler Tape)	Mike Shinoda, Mark Wakefield
1997	Deftest	Xero (Sampler Tape)	Mike Shinoda, Mark Wakefield
1997	Stick N' Move	Xero (Sampler Tape)	Mike Shinoda, Mark Wakefield
1997	Rhinestone	Xero (Sampler Tape)	Xero
1997	Reading My Eyes	Xero (Sampler Tape)	Xero
1997	Fuse	Xero (Sampler Tape)	Xero
1998	Closing	Rapology 12	Xero
1998	Drop	Rapology 13	Mike Shinoda, Joe Hahn
1998	Fiends	Rapology 14	Xero (feat. Emcee 007)
1998	Pictureboard (Note: A song that was recorded in 1998 which the band reportedly couldn't previously release due to sampling issues.)		
1999	Carousel	Hybrid Theory (EP)	Mike Shinoda, Joe Hahn, Brad Delson, Chester Bennington, Rob Bourdon
1999	Technique (short)	Hybrid Theory (EP)	Mike Shinoda, Joe Hahn
1999	Step Up	Hybrid Theory (EP)	Mike Shinoda, Joe Hahn, Brad Delson
1999	And One	Hybrid Theory (EP)	Mike Shinoda, Joe Hahn, Brad Delson, Chester Bennington, Rob Bourdon
1999	High Voltage	Hybrid Theory (EP)	Mike Shinoda, Joe Hahn, Brad Delson
1999	Part of Me (Note: An untitled instrumental track begins at 9:58)	Hybrid Theory (EP)	Mike Shinoda, Joe Hahn, Brad Delson, Chester Bennington, Rob Bourdon
1999	A Place for My Head (Esaul)	Hybrid Theory (2-track Demo)	Hybrid Theory
1999	By Myself (Demo)	Hybrid Theory (2-track Demo)	Hybrid Theory
1999	Plaster ("One Step Closer" Demo)	Hybrid Theory (6-track Demo)	Hybrid Theory
1999	Papercut (Demo)	Hybrid Theory (6-track Demo)	Hybrid Theory
1999	Crawling (Demo)	Hybrid Theory (6-track Demo)	Hybrid Theory
1999	Points Of Authority (Demo)	Hybrid Theory (6-track Demo)	Hybrid Theory
1999	Dust Brothers ("With You" Demo)	Hybrid Theory (6-track Demo)	Hybrid Theory
1999	Untitled ("In The End" Demo)	Hybrid Theory 8-track Demo	Hybrid Theory
1999	SuperXero ("By Myself" Demo)	Hybrid Theory 8-track Demo	Hybrid Theory
1999	Points and Authority (Demo)	Hybrid Theory 8-track Demo	Hybrid Theory
1999	Crawling (Demo)	Hybrid Theory 8-track Demo	Hybrid Theory
1999	She Couldn't (Demo)	Hybrid Theory 8-track Demo	Hybrid Theory
1999	Carousel (Demo)	Hybrid Theory 8-track Demo	Hybrid Theory
1999	Part of Me (Demo)	Hybrid Theory 8-track Demo	Hybrid Theory
1999	And One (Demo)	Hybrid Theory 8-track Demo	Hybrid Theory
2000	Papercut †	Hybrid Theory	Linkin Park
2000	One Step Closer †	Hybrid Theory	Linkin Park
2000	With You	Hybrid Theory	Linkin Park, The Dust Brothers
2000	Points of Authority #	Hybrid Theory	Linkin Park
2000	Crawling †	Hybrid Theory	Linkin Park
2000	Runaway	Hybrid Theory	Linkin Park, Mark Wakefield
2000	By Myself	Hybrid Theory	Linkin Park
2000	In the End †	Hybrid Theory	Linkin Park
2000	A Place for My Head	Hybrid Theory	Linkin Park, Mark Wakefield, Dave Farrell
2000	Forgotten	Hybrid Theory	Linkin Park, Mark Wakefield, Dave Farrell
2000	Cure for the Itch	Hybrid Theory	Linkin Park
2000	Pushing Me Away	Hybrid Theory	Linkin Park
2000	My December (Note: Included in the Japanese edition of the album)	Hybrid Theory	Mike Shinoda
2000	High Voltage (Note: Included in the Japanese edition of the album)	Hybrid Theory	Linkin Park
2002	Opening	Reanimation	Mike Shinoda
2002	Pts.OF.Athrty †	Reanimation	Linkin Park, Jay Gordon
2002	Enth E ND #	Reanimation	Linkin Park, KutMasta Kurt and Motion Man.
2002	[Chali]	Reanimation	Linkin Park
2002	FRGT/10 #	Reanimation	Linkin Park, Alchemist and Chali 2na
2002	P5hng Me A*wy #	Reanimation	Mike Shinoda, Stephen Richards
2002	Plc.4 Mie Hæd	Reanimation	Linkin Park, Amp Live and Zion I
2002	X-Ecutioner Style	Reanimation	Linkin Park, Sean C, Roc Raida and Black Thought
2002	H! Vltg3	Reanimation	Linkin Park, Evidence, Pharoahe Monch and DJ Babu
2002	[Riff Raff]	Reanimation	Linkin Park
2002	Wth>You	Reanimation	Linkin Park, Aceyalone
2002	Ntr\Mssion	Reanimation	Linkin Park
2002	Ppr:Kut	Reanimation	Linkin Park, DJ Cheapshot, Jubacca, Rasco and Planet Asia
2002	Rnw@y	Reanimation	Linkin Park, Backyard Bangers and Phoenix Orion
2002	My<Dsmbr	Reanimation	Linkin Park, Mickey P. and Kelli Ali
2002	[Stef]	Reanimation	Linkin Park
2002	By_Myslf	Reanimation	Linkin Park, Josh Abraham
2002	Kyur4 Th Ich	Reanimation	Linkin Park
2002	1Stp Klosr	Reanimation	Linkin Park, The Humble Brothers and Jonathan Davis
2002	Krwlng	Reanimation	Linkin Park, Aaron Lewis
2002	A.06	LP Underground 2.0	Linkin Park
2002	Dedicated (Demo 1999)	LP Underground 2.0	Mike Shinoda, Brad Delson, Joe Hahn, Chester Bennington
2003	Foreword	Meteora	Linkin Park
2003	Don't Stay	Meteora	Linkin Park
2003	Somewhere I Belong †	Meteora	Linkin Park
2003	Lying from You #	Meteora	Linkin Park
2003	Hit the Floor	Meteora	Linkin Park
2003	Easier to Run	Meteora	Linkin Park
2003	Faint †	Meteora	Linkin Park
2003	Figure.09	Meteora	Linkin Park
2003	Breaking the Habit †	Meteora	Linkin Park
2003	From the Inside †	Meteora	Linkin Park
2003	Nobody's Listening	Meteora	Linkin Park
2003	Session	Meteora	Linkin Park
2003	Numb †	Meteora	Linkin Park
2004	Sold My Soul to Yo Mama	LP Underground 4.0	Joe Hahn, Chester Bennington, Mike Shinoda
2004	Standing in the Middle (Note: Performed by Motion Man featuring Mike Shinoda)	LP Underground 4.0	Mike Shinoda
2004	Dirt off Your Shoulder/Lying from You	Collision Course	Jay-Z and Linkin Park
2004	Big Pimpin'/Papercut	Collision Course	Jay-Z and Linkin Park
2004	Jigga What/Faint	Collision Course	Jay-Z and Linkin Park
2004	Numb/Encore †	Collision Course	Jay-Z and Linkin Park
2004	Izzo/In the End	Collision Course	Jay-Z and Linkin Park
2004	Points of Authority/99 Problems/One Step Closer	Collision Course	Jay-Z and Linkin Park
2004	Numb/Encore (Bonus Beat)	Numb/Encore	Jay-Z and Linkin Park
2006	Announcement Service Public	LP Underground 6.0	Linkin Park
2006	Qwerty †	LP Underground 6.0	Linkin Park
2007	Wake	Minutes to Midnight	Linkin Park
2007	Given Up †	Minutes to Midnight	Linkin Park
2007	Leave Out All the Rest †	Minutes to Midnight	Linkin Park
2007	Bleed It Out †	Minutes to Midnight	Linkin Park
2007	Shadow of the Day †	Minutes to Midnight	Linkin Park
2007	What I've Done †	Minutes to Midnight	Linkin Park
2007	Hands Held High	Minutes to Midnight	Linkin Park
2007	No More Sorrow #	Minutes to Midnight	Linkin Park
2007	Valentine's Day	Minutes to Midnight	Linkin Park
2007	In Between	Minutes to Midnight	Linkin Park
2007	In Pieces	Minutes to Midnight	Linkin Park
2007	The Little Things Give You Away	Minutes to Midnight	Linkin Park
2007	No Roads Left (Note: Included in the European and Japanese Tour Edition Tour of the album)	Minutes to Midnight	Linkin Park
2008	You Ain't Gotsta Gotsta	mmm... Cookies: Sweet Hamster Like Jewels From America! (Underground 8.0)	Linkin Park
2008	Bubbles	mmm... Cookies: Sweet Hamster Like Jewels From America! (Underground 8.0)	Linkin Park
2008	No Laundry	mmm... Cookies: Sweet Hamster Like Jewels From America! (Underground 8.0)	Linkin Park
2008	Da Bloos	mmm... Cookies: Sweet Hamster Like Jewels From America! (Underground 8.0)	Linkin Park
2008	PB n' Jellyfish	mmm... Cookies: Sweet Hamster Like Jewels From America! (Underground 8.0)	Linkin Park
2008	26 Lettaz in da Alphabet	mmm... Cookies: Sweet Hamster Like Jewels From America! (Underground 8.0)	Linkin Park
2008	Lockjaw (Note: An instrumental demo completed with Pro Tools 8, and later the song was given to LPU 8 members as a holiday downloadable gift)	Non-album track	Mike Shinoda, Rob Bourdon
2009	New Divide †	Transformers: Revenge of the Fallen	Linkin Park
2009	A-Six (Original Long Version 2002)	LP Underground 9: Demos	Linkin Park
2009	Faint (Demo 2002)	LP Underground 9: Demos	Linkin Park
2009	Sad (By Myself Demo 1999)	LP Underground 9: Demos	Linkin Park
2009	Fear (Leave Out All the Rest Demo 2006)	LP Underground 9: Demos	Linkin Park
2009	Figure.09 (Demo 2002)	LP Underground 9: Demos	Linkin Park
2009	Stick and Move (Runaway Demo 1998)	LP Underground 9: Demos	Linkin Park, Mark Wakefield
2009	Across the Line (Unreleased Demo 2007)	LP Underground 9: Demos	Linkin Park
2009	Drawing (Breaking the Habit Demo 2002)	LP Underground 9: Demos	Linkin Park
2009	Drum Song (Little Things Give You Away Demo 2006)	LP Underground 9: Demos	Linkin Park
2010	Not Alone †	Download to Donate for Haiti	Linkin Park
2010	The Requiem	A Thousand Suns	Linkin Park
2010	The Radiance	A Thousand Suns	Linkin Park
2010	Burning in the Skies †	A Thousand Suns	Linkin Park
2010	Empty Spaces	A Thousand Suns	Linkin Park
2010	When They Come for Me	A Thousand Suns	Linkin Park
2010	Robot Boy	A Thousand Suns	Linkin Park
2010	Jornada del Muerto	A Thousand Suns	Linkin Park
2010	Waiting for the End †	A Thousand Suns	Linkin Park
2010	Blackout #	A Thousand Suns	Linkin Park
2010	Wretches and Kings #	A Thousand Suns	Linkin Park, Mario Savio
2010	Wisdom, Justice, and Love	A Thousand Suns	Linkin Park, Martin Luther King Jr.
2010	Iridescent †	A Thousand Suns	Linkin Park
2010	Fallout	A Thousand Suns	Linkin Park
2010	The Catalyst †	A Thousand Suns	Linkin Park
2010	The Messenger	A Thousand Suns	Linkin Park
2010	A Thousand Suns: The Full Experience (Note: Included in the iTunes Deluxe Edition of the album)	A Thousand Suns	Linkin Park
2010	Blackbirds (Note: Included in the iTunes Deluxe Edition of the album)	A Thousand Suns	Linkin Park
2010	Unfortunate (Unreleased Demo 2002)	Underground X: Demos	Linkin Park
2010	What We Don't Know (Unreleased Demo 2007)	Underground X: Demos	Linkin Park
2010	Oh No (Points of Authority Demo)	Underground X: Demos	Linkin Park
2010	I Have Not Begun (Unreleased Demo 2009)	Underground X: Demos	Linkin Park
2010	Pale (Unreleased Demo 2006)	Underground X: Demos	Linkin Park
2010	Pretend to Be (Unreleased Demo 2008)	Underground X: Demos	Linkin Park
2010	Divided (Unreleased Demo 2005)	Underground X: Demos	Linkin Park
2010	What I've Done (M. Shinoda Remix)	Underground X: Demos	Linkin Park
2010	Coal (Unreleased Demo 1997)	Underground X: Demos	Linkin Park
2010	Halo (Unreleased Demo 2002)	Underground X: Demos	Linkin Park
2011	Issho Ni	Download to Donate: Tsunami Relief	Linkin Park
2011	Pay Yo Respektz		Dave "Phoenix" Farrell, Mike Shinoda
2011	YO (MTM Demo)	Underground Eleven	Linkin Park
2011	Slip (1998 Unreleased Hybrid Theory Demo)	Underground Eleven	Linkin Park, Mark Wakefield
2011	Soundtrack (Meteora Demo)	Underground Eleven	Linkin Park
2011	In the End (Demo)	Underground Eleven	Linkin Park
2011	Program (Meteora Demo)	Underground Eleven	Linkin Park
2011	Bang Three (What I've Done Original Demo)	Underground Eleven	Linkin Park
2011	Robot Boy (Test Mix, Optional Vocal Take)	Underground Eleven	Linkin Park
2011	Broken Foot (Meteora Demo)	Underground Eleven	Linkin Park
2011	Esaul (A Place for My Head Demo)	Underground Eleven	Linkin Park, Mark Wakefield
2011	Blue (1998 Unreleased Hybrid Theory Demo)	Underground Eleven	Linkin Park
2012	Lost in the Echo †	Living Things	Linkin Park
2012	In My Remains	Living Things	Linkin Park
2012	Burn It Down †	Living Things	Linkin Park
2012	Lies Greed Misery #	Living Things	Linkin Park
2012	I'll Be Gone	Living Things	Linkin Park
2012	Castle of Glass †	Living Things	Linkin Park
2012	Victimized	Living Things	Linkin Park
2012	Roads Untraveled	Living Things	Linkin Park
2012	Skin to Bone	Living Things	Linkin Park
2012	Until It Breaks	Living Things	Linkin Park
2012	Tinfoil	Living Things	Linkin Park
2012	Powerless †	Living Things	Linkin Park
2012	Homecoming (Minutes to Midnight Demo)	LP Underground 12.0	Linkin Park
2012	Points of Authority (Demo)	LP Underground 12.0	Linkin Park
2012	Clarity (Minutes to Midnight Demo)	LP Underground 12.0	Linkin Park
2012	Asbestos (Minutes to Midnight Demo)	LP Underground 12.0	Linkin Park
2012	Bunker (Minutes to Midnight Demo)	LP Underground 12.0	Linkin Park
2012	So Far Away (Unreleased 1998)	LP Underground 12.0	Linkin Park
2012	Pepper (Meteora Demo)	LP Underground 12.0	Linkin Park
2012	Debris (Minutes to Midnight Demo)	LP Underground 12.0	Linkin Park
2012	Ominous (Meteora Demo)	LP Underground 12.0	Linkin Park
2012	Forgotten (Demo)	LP Underground 12.0	Linkin Park, Mark Wakefield
2012	Bruiser	StageLight Demos EP	Linkin Park
2012	Space Station	StageLight Demos EP	Linkin Park
2012	Complimentary	StageLight Demos EP	Linkin Park
2012	Loop Jam 1	StageLight Demos EP	Linkin Park
2012	Loop Jam 2	StageLight Demos EP	Linkin Park
2013	A Light That Never Comes †	Recharged	Linkin Park, Steve Aoki
2013	Castle of Glass (M. Shinoda Remix)	Recharged	Linkin Park
2013	Lost in the Echo (Killsonik Remix)	Recharged	Linkin Park
2013	Victimized (M. Shinoda Remix)	Recharged	Linkin Park
2013	I'll Be Gone (Vice Remix) (featuring Pusha T) #	Recharged	Linkin Park, Pusha T
2013	Lies Greed Misery (Dirtyphonics Remix)	Recharged	Linkin Park
2013	Roads Untraveled (Rad Omen Remix) (featuring Bun B)	Recharged	Linkin Park, Bun B
2013	Powerless (Enferno Remix)	Recharged	Linkin Park
2013	Burn It Down (Tom Swoon Remix)	Recharged	Linkin Park
2013	Until It Breaks (Datsik Remix)	Recharged	Linkin Park
2013	Skin to Bone (Nick Catchdubs Remix) (featuring Cody B. Ware & Ryu)	Recharged	Linkin Park, Cody B. Ware, Ryu
2013	I'll Be Gone (Schoolboy Remix)	Recharged	Linkin Park
2013	Until It Breaks (Money Mark Headphone Remix)	Recharged	Linkin Park
2013	A Light That Never Comes (Rick Rubin Reboot)	Recharged	Linkin Park
2013	Burn It Down (Paul van Dyk Remix) (Note: Included in the album as a pre-order bonus track)	Recharged	Linkin Park
2013	Basquiat (2007 Demo)	LP Underground XIII	Linkin Park
2013	Holding Company (2011 Demo)	LP Underground XIII	Linkin Park
2013	Primo (I'll Be Gone - Longform 2010 Demo)	LP Underground XIII	Linkin Park
2013	Hemispheres (2011 Demo)	LP Underground XIII	Linkin Park
2013	Cumulus (2002 Demo)	LP Underground XIII	Linkin Park
2013	Pretty Birdy (Somewhere I Belong 2002 Demo)	LP Underground XIII	Linkin Park
2013	Universe (2006 Demo)	LP Underground XIII	Linkin Park
2013	Apaches (Until It Breaks Demo, No. 1)	LP Underground XIII	Linkin Park
2013	Foot Patrol (Until It Breaks Demo, No. 2)	LP Underground XIII	Linkin Park
2013	Three Band Terror (Until It Breaks Demo, No. 3)	LP Underground XIII	Linkin Park
2013	Truth Inside a Lie (By Ryan Giles) [LPU Sessions 2013]	LP Underground XIII	Ryan Giles
2013	Change (By Beta State) [LPU Sessions 2013]	LP Underground XIII	Matt McDonald, Ryan Hernandez, Justin Kastner, Adrian Robinson
2014	Keys to the Kingdom	The Hunting Party	Linkin Park
2014	All for Nothing (featuring Page Hamilton)	The Hunting Party	Linkin Park
2014	Guilty All the Same (featuring Rakim) †	The Hunting Party	Linkin Park, Rakim
2014	The Summoning	The Hunting Party	Linkin Park
2014	War	The Hunting Party	Linkin Park
2014	Wastelands †	The Hunting Party	Linkin Park
2014	Until It's Gone †	The Hunting Party	Linkin Park
2014	Rebellion (featuring Daron Malakian) †	The Hunting Party	Linkin Park, Daron Malakian
2014	Mark the Graves	The Hunting Party	Linkin Park
2014	Drawbar (featuring Tom Morello)	The Hunting Party	Linkin Park
2014	Final Masquerade †	The Hunting Party	Linkin Park
2014	A Line in the Sand	The Hunting Party	Linkin Park
2014	White Noise #	Mall (soundtrack)	Chester Bennington, Dave Farrell, Joe Hahn, Mike Shinoda
2014	Jeff Walks	Mall (soundtrack)	Chester Bennington, Dave Farrell, Joe Hahn, Mike Shinoda
2014	Mall Blueprint	Mall (soundtrack)	Chester Bennington, Dave Farrell, Joe Hahn, Mike Shinoda
2014	Jeff Makes Observations	Mall (soundtrack)	Chester Bennington, Dave Farrell, Joe Hahn, Mike Shinoda
2014	Barry's Story	Mall (soundtrack)	Chester Bennington, Dave Farrell, Joe Hahn, Mike Shinoda
2014	Mal RX7	Mall (soundtrack)	Chester Bennington, Dave Farrell, Joe Hahn, Mike Shinoda
2014	Changing Room Tease	Mall (soundtrack)	Chester Bennington, Dave Farrell, Joe Hahn, Mike Shinoda
2014	Danny in Police Car - Mal Gears Up	Mall (soundtrack)	Chester Bennington, Dave Farrell, Joe Hahn, Mike Shinoda
2014	Mal Gives Barry Second Chance - Mal Unloads	Mall (soundtrack)	Chester Bennington, Dave Farrell, Joe Hahn, Mike Shinoda
2014	Mall Carnage - Mal Stalked	Mall (soundtrack)	Chester Bennington, Dave Farrell, Joe Hahn, Mike Shinoda
2014	It Goes Through	Mall (soundtrack)	Chester Bennington, Dave Farrell, Joe Hahn, Mike Shinoda
2014	Cops Arrive	Mall (soundtrack)	Chester Bennington, Dave Farrell, Joe Hahn, Mike Shinoda
2014	Danny's Lucky Day	Mall (soundtrack)	Chester Bennington, Dave Farrell, Joe Hahn, Mike Shinoda
2014	Jeff Philosophizes to Donna	Mall (soundtrack)	Chester Bennington, Dave Farrell, Joe Hahn, Mike Shinoda
2014	Jeff and Donna Connect	Mall (soundtrack)	Chester Bennington, Dave Farrell, Joe Hahn, Mike Shinoda
2014	Jeff Trips in the Mirror	Mall (soundtrack)	Chester Bennington, Dave Farrell, Joe Hahn, Mike Shinoda
2014	Adele and Danny In the Backseat	Mall (soundtrack)	Chester Bennington, Dave Farrell, Joe Hahn, Mike Shinoda
2014	Mal vs. Helicopter	Mall (soundtrack)	Chester Bennington, Dave Farrell, Joe Hahn, Mike Shinoda
2014	Devil's Drop	Mall (soundtrack)	Chester Bennington, Dave Farrell, Joe Hahn, Mike Shinoda
2014	TV Comes to Life - Mal and Jeff	Mall (soundtrack)	Chester Bennington, Dave Farrell, Joe Hahn, Mike Shinoda
2014	The Last Line	Mall (soundtrack)	Chester Bennington, Dave Farrell, Joe Hahn, Mike Shinoda
2014	Danny Goes Home	Mall (soundtrack)	Chester Bennington, Dave Farrell, Joe Hahn, Mike Shinoda
2014	Dancer	Mall (soundtrack)	Chester Bennington, Dave Farrell, Joe Hahn, Mike Shinoda
2014	Aubrey One (2009 Demo)	LP Underground XIV	Linkin Park
2014	Malathion+Tritonus (2008 Berlin Demo)	LP Underground XIV	Linkin Park
2014	Berlin One, Version C(2009 Demo)	LP Underground XIV	Linkin Park
2014	Blanka (2008 Demo)	LP Underground XIV	Linkin Park
2014	Heartburn (2007 Demo)	LP Underground XIV	Linkin Park
2014	Breaking the Habit Original Mike (2002 Demo)	LP Underground XIV	Linkin Park
2014	Dave Sbeat feat. Joe	LP Underground XIV	Dave Farrell, Joe Hahn
2014	Froctagon (2009 Demo)	LP Underground XIV	Linkin Park
2014	Rhinoceros (2002 Demo)	LP Underground XIV	Linkin Park
2014	After Canada (2005 Demo)	LP Underground XIV	Linkin Park
2015	Final Masquerade (acoustic) #		Linkin Park
2015	Animals (2011 Demo)	LP Underground 15	Linkin Park
2015	Basil (2008 Demo)	LP Underground 15	Linkin Park
2015	Pods 1 of 3 (1998 Demo)	LP Underground 15	Linkin Park
2015	Pods 2 of 3 (1998 Demo)	LP Underground 15	Linkin Park
2015	Pods 3 of 3 (1998 Demo)	LP Underground 15	Linkin Park
2015	Chance of Rain (2006 Demo)	LP Underground 15	Linkin Park
2015	TooLeGit (2010 Demo)	LP Underground 15	Linkin Park
2016	Grudgematch (2009 Demo)	LP Underground 15	Linkin Park
2016	Hurry (1999 Demo)	LP Underground 15	Linkin Park
2016	Grr (1999 Demo)	LP Underground 15	Linkin Park
2016	Attached (2003 Demo)	LP Underground 15	Linkin Park
2016	Chair (1999 Demo)	LP Underground 15	Linkin Park
2016	The Catalyst (2010 Demo)	LP Underground Sixteen	Linkin Park
2016	Can't Hurt Me (2014 Demo)	LP Underground Sixteen	Linkin Park
2016	Dark Crystal (2015 Demo)	LP Underground Sixteen	Linkin Park
2016	Air Force One (2015 Demo)	LP Underground Sixteen	Linkin Park
2016	Bleed It Out (2007 Demo)	LP Underground Sixteen	Linkin Park
2016	Consequence A (2010 Demo)	LP Underground Sixteen	Linkin Park
2016	Consequence B (2010 Demo)	LP Underground Sixteen	Linkin Park
2016	Lies Greed Misery (2010 Demo)	LP Underground Sixteen	Linkin Park
2016	Burberry (2015 Demo)	LP Underground Sixteen	Linkin Park
2016	Symphonies of Light Reprise (2010 Demo)	LP Underground Sixteen	Linkin Park
2017	Nobody Can Save Me	One More Light	Brad Delson, Mike Shinoda, Jon Green
2017	Good Goodbye (feat. Pusha T and Stormzy) #	One More Light	Brad Delson, Mike Shinoda, Jesse Shatkin, Stormzy, Pusha T
2017	Talking to Myself †	One More Light	Brad Delson, Mike Shinoda, Ilsey Juber, J.R. Rotem
2017	Battle Symphony #	One More Light	Brad Delson, Mike Shinoda, Jon Green
2017	Invisible #	One More Light	Mike Shinoda, Justin Parker
2017	Heavy (feat. Kiiara) †	One More Light	Chester Bennington, Brad Delson, Mike Shinoda, Julia Michaels, Justin Tranter
2017	Sorry for Now	One More Light	Mike Shinoda
2017	Halfway Right	One More Light	Chester Bennington, Brad Delson, Mike Shinoda, Ross Golan, Michael Keenan
2017	One More Light †	One More Light	Mike Shinoda, Eg White
2017	Sharp Edges	One More Light	Brad Delson, Mike Shinoda, Ilsey Juber
2017	Looking For An Answer		Mike Shinoda
2020	Dialate (Xero demo)	Hybrid Theory (20th Anniversary Edition)	Mike Shinoda, Mark Wakefield, Clifford Smith, Robert Fitzgerald Diggs, Corey Woods
2020	Pictureboard	Hybrid Theory (20th Anniversary Edition)	Brad Delson, Joe Hahn, Mike Shinoda, Mark Wakefield, Barry Eugene White
2020	She Couldn't	Hybrid Theory (20th Anniversary Edition)	Chester Bennington, Brad Delson, Mike Shinoda, Milo Berger, Erik Meltzer, Joe Thomas, Lance Quinn, Brad Baker, Donnie Lewis, Yasiin Bey
2020	Could Have Been	Hybrid Theory (20th Anniversary Edition)	Chester Bennington, Brad Delson, Mike Shinoda
2020	Reading My Eyes (Xero demo)	Hybrid Theory (20th Anniversary Edition)	Mike Shinoda, Mark Wakefield
2020	Rhinestone (Xero demo)	Hybrid Theory (20th Anniversary Edition)	Brad Delson, Joe Hahn, Mike Shinoda, Mark Wakefield
2020	Esaul (Xero demo)	Hybrid Theory (20th Anniversary Edition)	Brad Delson, Joe Hahn, Mike Shinoda, Mark Wakefield
2020	Stick N Move (demo)	Hybrid Theory (20th Anniversary Edition)	Mike Shinoda, Mark Wakefield
2020	Carousel (demo)	Hybrid Theory (20th Anniversary Edition)	Chester Bennington, Rob Bourdon, Brad Delson, Joe Hahn, Mike Shinoda
2020	Points of Authority (demo)	Hybrid Theory (20th Anniversary Edition)	Chester Bennington, Rob Bourdon, Brad Delson, Joe Hahn, Mike Shinoda
2020	Crawling (demo)	Hybrid Theory (20th Anniversary Edition)	Chester Bennington, Rob Bourdon, Brad Delson, Joe Hahn, Mike Shinoda
2020	SuperXero ("By Myself" demo)	Hybrid Theory (20th Anniversary Edition)	Chester Bennington, Brad Delson, Mike Shinoda
2023	Lost	Meteora (20th Anniversary Edition)	Linkin Park
2023	Fighting Myself	Meteora (20th Anniversary Edition)	Linkin Park
2023	More The Victim	Meteora (20th Anniversary Edition)	Linkin Park
2023	Massive	Meteora (20th Anniversary Edition)	Linkin Park
2023	Healing Foot	Meteora (20th Anniversary Edition)	Linkin Park
2023	A6 (Meteora20 demo)	Meteora (20th Anniversary Edition)	Linkin Park
2023	Cuidado ("Lying from You" demo)	Meteora (20th Anniversary Edition)	Linkin Park
2023	Husky ("Hit the Floor" demo)	Meteora (20th Anniversary Edition)	Linkin Park
2023	Interrogation ("Easier to Run" demo)	Meteora (20th Anniversary Edition)	Linkin Park
2023	Faint (Meteora20 demo)	Meteora (20th Anniversary Edition)	Linkin Park
2023	Plaster 2 ("Figure.09" demo)	Meteora (20th Anniversary Edition)	Linkin Park
2023	Shifter ("From the Inside" demo)	Meteora (20th Anniversary Edition)	Linkin Park
2023	Wesside	Meteora (20th Anniversary Edition)	Linkin Park
2023	Resolution	Meteora (20th Anniversary Edition)	Linkin Park
2023	Lost (2002 Mix)	Meteora (20th Anniversary Edition) [Deluxe CD Edition]	Linkin Park
2024	Friendly Fire	Papercuts (Singles Collection 2000–2023)	Mike Shinoda, Brad Delson, Jon Green
2024	The Emptiness Machine	From Zero	Linkin Park
2024	From Zero (Intro)	From Zero	Linkin Park
2024	Casualty	From Zero	Linkin Park
2024	Two Faced	From Zero	Linkin Park
2024	Cut the Bridge	From Zero	Linkin Park, Bea Miller, Nick Long
2024	Heavy Is the Crown	From Zero	Linkin Park, Mike Elizondo
2024	Over Each Other	From Zero	Linkin Park, Jon Green, Matias Mora
2024	Overflow	From Zero	Linkin Park, Mike Elizondo, Teddy Swims, Jake Torrey
2024	Stained	From Zero	Linkin Park, Cal Shapiro
2024	IGYEIH	From Zero	Linkin Park, Nick Long
2024	Good Things Go	From Zero	Linkin Park, Jake Torrey
2025	Up From the Bottom	From Zero (Deluxe Edition)	Linkin Park
2025	Unshatter	From Zero (Deluxe Edition)	Linkin Park
2025	Let You Fade	From Zero (Deluxe Edition)	Linkin Park
