= Download to Donate for Haiti V2.0 =

Compilation album by Various Artists
- Released: January 11, 2011
- Recorded: 2010–2011
- Genre: Alternative rock; soft rock
- Length: 37:43:41
- Label: Warner Bros. Records, Machine Shop
- Producer: Mike Shinoda; Enrique Iglesias (co.)

Linkin Park non-studio album chronology
A Decade Underground (2010)	Download to Donate for Haiti V2.0 (2011)	Download to Donate: Tsunami Relief (2011)

Download to Donate for Haiti V2.0 is a sequel of the compilation album Download to Donate for Haiti by various artists. This is also for the benefit of the 2010 Haiti earthquake, but was released on January 11, 2011. This album was released via Download to Donate.

== Background ==
The Music for Relief official website announced an updated version/sequel of Download to Donate for Haiti, called Download to Donate for Haiti V2.0, which was released on January 11, 2011. Some of the tracks from the first Download to Donate for Haiti were included in the album. The cause has raised more than $26,000. The donations support Artists for Peace and Justice, charity: water, Direct Relief, Partners In Health and the United Nations Foundation, as well as reconstruction and the delivery of food, water and medical care in Haiti.

On February 22, 2011, Linkin Park members Chester Bennington, Brad Delson, Joe Hahn and Rob Bourdon joined United Nations Secretary General Ban Ki-moon in a Facebook Town Hall discussion on their continued work on raising efforts on awareness of Haiti. Fans were also encouraged to participate in the Download to Donate campaign.

The songs were no longer available for download after December 10, 2011. Music for Relief selected the Haitian Education and Leadership Program, or HELP, a program that gives higher education to young Haitians, as the final beneficiary of funds raised through Download to Donate for Haiti V2.0. Music for Relief still accepts donations for Haiti.

== Track listing ==
#	Title	Performer(s)	Length
1	"Still" (Acoustic, Vancouver Sessions)	Alanis Morissette	5:33
2	"The Ballad of Allo Guru"	Allo Guru	4:47
3	"The Ladder"	Andrew Belle	4:02
4	"Destroying to Save"	Arbouretum	5:08
5	"Trails"	Asobi Seksu	4:00
6	"Shoulder Full of You"	Blitzen Trapper	2:17
7	"Hammer"	Blue King Brown featuring Voodoo Dred and Lady Nadee	3:41
8	"Plath Heart"	Braids	4:26
9	"Cellophane"	Caribou	3:06
10	"Gebre"	Caribou	4:07
11	"Sea Rea"	Caribou	3:45
12	"Selfish Boy"	Caribou	5:16
13	"The Dauphin"	Caribou	4:36
14	"Yusef"	Caribou	1:58
15	"100 Other Lovers"	DeVotchKa	3:25
16	"Gargoyle" (Live)	Dinosaur Jr.	6:11
17	"It Must Be Love"	Enrique Iglesias	3:44
18	"The Rush"	Everest	4:02
19	"Firecracker"	Frazey Ford	3:47
20	"National Anthem" (Quickie Mart Remix)	Freddie Gibbs	4:04
21	"Yours Forever"	Generationals	3:07
22	"Jonah"	Guster	3:23
23	"A Quiet Place"	Home Video	3:51
24	"Anyone's Guess"	Hyena	3:24
25	"Times Like These" (Live from Red Rocks)	Jack Johnson	2:37
26	"Feast of the Heart" (KCRW.com Presents)	Jesca Hoop	3:26
27	"Never Let Me Down"	Kenna (produced by Mike Shinoda and Chad Hugo)	3:13
28	"Desperate Girls and Stupid Boys" (Live from the KIIS Community Council)	Kimberly Caldwell	3:26
29	"Catholic Boys"	Kitten	3:39
30	"New Thing" (Live)	Lake Trout	4:43
31	"Riddle" (Live)	Lake Trout	4:37
32	"Say Something" (Live)	Lake Trout	7:09
33	"Stutter" (Live)	Lake Trout	4:52
34	"Wave of Mutilation" (Live)	Lake Trout	3:19
35	"Take My Hand" (Live from the John Lennon Educational Tour Bus)	Langhorne Slim	3:20
36	"Single Girls"	Laura Jansen	3:36
37	"Come Now"	Liars	5:02
38	"Not Alone"	Linkin Park	4:12
39	"The Catalyst" (Keaton Hashimoto Remix)	Linkin Park	2:52
40	"Resurrection"	Kenna featuring Lupe Fiasco (produced by Mike Shinoda)	4:07
41	"Faster"	Matt Nathanson	3:25
42	"Gold Guns Girls" (Mike Shinoda Remix)	Metric	5:12
43	"Look Away"	Mickey Hart	5:59
44	"Louisiana Land"	OK Go	3:36
45	"Chocolate"	One Eskimo	4:04
46	"Iryna"	Paul Cary	3:43
47	"Too Too Fast" (Say Hi Remix)	Ra Ra Riot	2:42
48	"We Fell" (Dosh Remix)	S. Carey	4:33
49	"Give Me Something"	Scars On 45	3:22
50	"Mother Maria"	Slash featuring Beth Hart	5:27
51	"Red Eyes"	Switchfoot	4:50
52	"The Wind Blows" (Skrillex Remix)	The All-American Rejects	4:57
53	"Slipstream" (Slimmed Down Mix)	The Crystal Method featuring Jason Lytle	5:30
54	"A Dream Within a Dream" (Nalepa Remix)	The Glitch Mob	5:40
55	"A Dream Within a Dream" (Skeet Skeet Remix)	The Glitch Mob	4:14
56	"Animus Vox" (EPROM Remix)	The Glitch Mob	4:17
57	"Bad Wings" (Deru Remix)	The Glitch Mob	4:21
58	"Bad Wings" (Kastle Remix)	The Glitch Mob	4:38
59	"Bad Wings" (Them Jeans Remix)	The Glitch Mob	4:48
60	"Between Two Dreams" (Machinedrum Convergence)	The Glitch Mob	5:58
61	"Between Two Points" (Comma Remix)	The Glitch Mob	5:54
62	"Between Two Points (Jogger Remix)	The Glitch Mob	4:06
63	"Between Two Points" (King Britt Remix)	The Glitch Mob	6:25
64	"Between Two Points" (SPL Remix)	The Glitch Mob	6:39
65	"Between Two Points" (St. Andrew Remix)	The Glitch Mob	6:41
66	"Drive It Like You Stole It" (Mindelixir Remix)	The Glitch Mob	6:00
67	"Drive It Like You Stole It" (Mirko Kosmos Remix)	The Glitch Mob	4:07
68	"Drive It Like You Stole It" (Pawn Remix)	The Glitch Mob	4:19
69	"Fistful of Silence" (ESKMO Remix)	The Glitch Mob	5:08
70	"Fortune Days" (DJ Vadim Remix)	The Glitch Mob	3:58
71	"Fortune Days" (Virtual Boy Remix)	The Glitch Mob	4:55
72	"How to Be Eaten by a Woman" (Adam.01 Remix)	The Glitch Mob	5:58
73	"How to Be Eaten by a Woman" (Camo UFOs Remix)	The Glitch Mob	5:00
74	"How to Be Eaten by a Woman (Mr. Projectile Remix)	The Glitch Mob	3:46
75	"How to Be Eaten by a Woman (Salva Remix)	The Glitch Mob	6:29
76	"How to Be Eaten by a Woman" (St. Andrew Remix)	The Glitch Mob	6:41
77	"Starve the Ego, Feed the Soul" (R/D Remix)	The Glitch Mob	6:16
78	"We Swarm" (Beats Antique Remix)	The Glitch Mob	5:55
79	"We Swarm" (Chris De Luca Remix)	The Glitch Mob	7:41
80	"We're All One"	The Grouch	2:53
81	"Wood and Wire" (Sonic Session)	Thrice	2:53
82	"Unity" (Live)	Trevor	7:03
83	"Color of Sin"	Vanaprasta	4:22
84	"Leaving on the 5th"	Voxhaul Broadcast	3:40
85	"O.N.E." (Demo version)	Yeasayer	5:55
86	"Always"	Zion I	2:34
