= Download to Donate: Tsunami Relief =

Compilation album by Various Artists
- Released: March 22, 2011
- Recorded: 2010–2011
- Genre: Alternative rock, electronic rock, acoustic rock, pop
- Length: 103:41
- Label: Warner Bros., Machine Shop
- Producer: Mike Shinoda; Enrique Iglesias (co.)

Linkin Park non-studio album chronology
Download to Donate for Haiti V2.0 (2011)	Download to Donate: Tsunami Relief (2011)	Recharged (2013)

Download to Donate: Tsunami Relief (sometimes known as Download to Donate for Japan) is a compilation of songs by Music for Relief from different artists in which the proceeds went to Save the Children that helped the victims of the 2011 Tōhoku earthquake and tsunami. The third Download to Donate compilation album, it was launched on March 22, 2011 through Warner Bros. Records and Machine Shop Records. The songs were no longer available for download as of June 7, 2011.

== Track listing ==
#	Title	Performer(s)	Length
1	"21 and Up"	The Red Jumpsuit Apparatus	3:05
2	"Hallucinations"	Angels & Airwaves	4:40
3	"Best Places to Be a Mom"	Taking Back Sunday	3:32
4	"Bright Lights" (Live)	Placebo	3:30
5	"Dr. Jekkyl & Mr. Fame"	Black Cards	3:20
6	"Home"	B'z	4:14
7	"Take It Easy" (Live)	Surfer Blood	4:25
8	"Running Away" (Acoustic)	Hoobastank	3:38
9	"Shed Some Light" (Acoustic, Live)	Shinedown	4:42
10	"Song for a Soldier"	Sara Bareilles	3:38
11	"How He Loves" (Live)	Flyleaf	4:06
12	"Right Here" (Live)	Staind	4:27
13	"Sleazy" (Kesha cover)	Ben Folds	3:19
14	"Relief Next to Me" (Live)	Tegan and Sara	3:49
15	"Starlight" (Live)	Slash featuring Myles Kennedy	6:03
16	"Colorblind" (Live)	Counting Crows	3:49
17	"Man on the Moon" (Live)	R.E.M.	6:04
18	"GMB"	Talib Kweli	5:06
19	"Rhythm of Love" (Live)	Plain White T's	3:25
20	"Self Control"	Elliott Yamin	2:22
21	"Witchcraft" (Live)	Pendulum	4:20
22	"Saturday Night Again"	Patrick Stump	3:45
23	"Addicted" (Remix)	Enrique Iglesias	8:31
24	"Issho Ni"	Linkin Park	3:51
25	"Running with a Gun"	Slightly Stoopid	2:59
26	"The Hell Song" (Live)	Sum 41	3:41
