= WN =

WN may refer to:

- WN postcode area, North West England
- Southwest Airlines (IATA code WN)
- WeatherNation TV
- White nationalism
- White noise (disambiguation)
- Wikinews, a defunct news wiki
- World News Network (WN.com), a news aggregator service
- Willesden Traction Maintenance Depot, a railway depot in London, England
- Wisconsin Northern Railroad (reporting mark WN)
- WordNet, a semantic lexicon for the English language
- World News (disambiguation)
- Web novel
- WN catalogue, a catalogue of works by Frédéric Chopin
- Tungsten nitride, an inorganic compound with formula WN
- .wn, the default extension for documents in the WriteNow word processor's native file format
- Willie Nelson (born 1933), American country musician
- Welsh Not
