= Peter Mensah =

Ghanaian-British actor

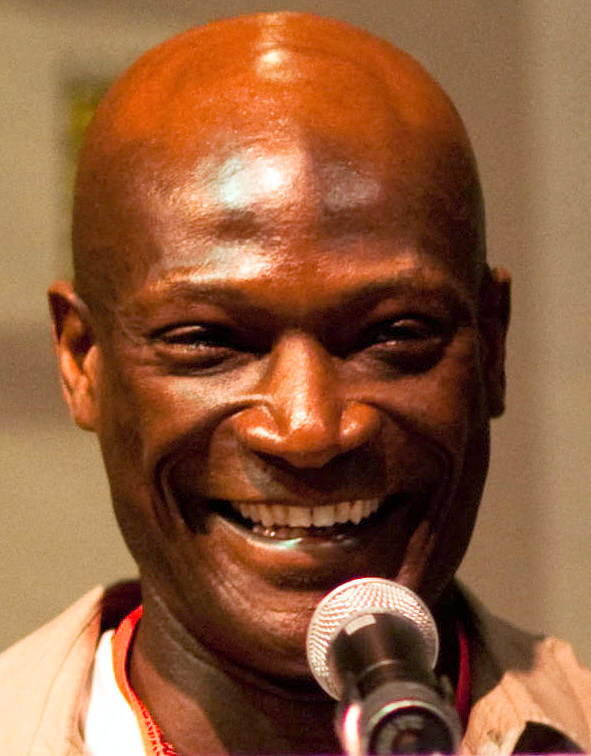
- ComicCon Spartacus Press Release 2009
- Born: 27 August 1959 (age 67); Chiraa, Bono Region, Ghana
- Citizenship: Ghana; United Kingdom
- Occupation: Actor
- Years active: 1995–present

Peter Mensah (born 27 August 1959) is a Ghanaian-born British-raised Canadian-American actor. He is best known for his role as Oenomaus on the Starz television series Spartacus (2010–2013). He has also appeared in such films as Tears of the Sun, Hidalgo, The Incredible Hulk, 300, Avatar, and Gladiator II.

== Early life ==
Mensah was born in Chiraa, Ghana, and comes from an academic family. He was born to parents from the Brong Ahafo Region, and moved to Hertfordshire, England, with his father, Peter Osei Mensah, an architect engineer, his mother, a writer, and two younger sisters at a young age. Mensah began practicing martial arts at the age of six.

Though he had done drama in school, Mensah originally studied engineering, and arrived in Canada as an engineer for British Gas, developing gas fields at Morecambe Bay.

== Career ==
Mensah's film credits include Avatar, 300, Hidalgo, Tears of the Sun, Jason X, Harvard Man, Bless the Child and The Incredible Hulk. He also stars in the short film The Seed, produced and directed by Linkin Park's DJ Joe Hahn. He has made television appearances in Star Trek: Enterprise, Tracker, Witchblade, Blue Murder, Relic Hunter, Earth: Final Conflict, Highlander: The Raven, and La Femme Nikita. He was a member of the repertory cast of the A&E Network series A Nero Wolfe Mystery and Terminator: The Sarah Connor Chronicles.

He voiced and provided his likeness for Sgt. Zach Hammond in EA's video game Dead Space.

Mensah played the character Oenomaus in Spartacus and was on the Spartacus Panel at Comic Con 2009 and 2011. He had a recurring role in the fifth season of True Blood.

He is the voice of Predaking, the dragon-like leader of the Predacons in Transformers: Prime.

== Filmography ==
=== Film ===
Year	Title	Role	Notes	Ref.
1999	Striking Poses	Hunky Receptionist		
2000	Bruiser	Skinhead		
2000	Bless the Child	Good Samaritan Janitor		
2000	The Perfect Son	Tall Gay Basher		
2001	Harvard Man	Cyrill The Butler		
2001	Jason X	Sgt. Brodski		
2002	Triggerman	Boxer		
2002	Cypher	Vault Security Guard		
2003	Tears of the Sun	Commander Samuel Terwase		
2004	Hidalgo	Jaffa		
2006	The Seed		Short film	
2006	300	Persian Messenger		
2008	The Incredible Hulk	General Joe Greller		
2009	Avatar	Horse clan leader Akwey	Cameo	
2014	300: Rise of an Empire	Persian Messenger		
2016	The Second Sound Barrier	Thelonious Courage as The Powerhouse	Short film	
2016	Kevin Hart: What Now?	African Dictator		
2018	The Scorpion King: Book of Souls	Nebserek	Direct-to-video	
2019	Rise	Governor Gaddo		
2021	Snake Eyes	Blind Master		
2022	The Devil Conspiracy	Archangel Michael		
2024	Gladiator II	Jugurtha		
2025	Trust	Kroft		

=== Television ===
Year	Title	Role	Notes	Ref.
1999	The Golden Spiders: A Nero Wolfe Mystery	Mort Erwin	TV movie, pilot for the series Nero Wolfe	
2000	Enslavement: The True Story of Fanny Kemble	Quaka	TV movie	
2000	Relic Hunter	Witch Doctor	Episode: "Cross OF Voodoo"	
2000	Deep in The City	Lang	Episode: "Gorky Parkette"	
2001	Blue Murder	Marlon Anderson	2 episodes	
2001	A Nero Wolfe Mystery	Receptionist, Arthur	Episodes: "The Doorbell Rang", "Over My Dead Body" Pt.1/Pt.2	
2001–02	Witchblade	Hecter "Moby" Mobius	3 episodes	
2002	Tracker	Marak	Episode: "Native Son"	
2002	Conviction	T-Bone	TV movie	
2005	Star Trek: Enterprise	Daniel Greaves	2 episodes	
2008	Terminator: The Sarah Connor Chronicles	General Perry	2 episodes	
2010	Spartacus: Blood and Sand	Oenomaus / Doctore	Main cast	
2011	Spartacus: Gods of the Arena	Oenomaus / Doctore	Main cast	
2012	Spartacus: Vengeance	Oenomaus / Doctore	Main cast	
2012	True Blood	Kibwe		
2013	Transformers: Prime	Predaking (voice)	Recurring role (season 3)	
2013	Transformers Prime Beast Hunters: Predacons Rising	Predaking (voice)	TV movie	
2013	Burn Notice	Marco Cabral	Episode: "Nature of the Beast"	
2015–16	Sleepy Hollow	Hidden One		
2017–18	Midnight, Texas	Lemuel Bridger	Main role	
2018	Agents of S.H.I.E.L.D.	Qovas	Recurring role (season 5); 6 episodes	
2019	Departure	Levi Hall	Main cast (season 1)	

=== Video games ===
Year	Title	Role	Ref.
2008	Dead Space	Zach Hammond	
