= Download to Donate for Haiti =

2010 compilation album by various artists

Compilation album by Various Artists
- Released: January 19, 2010
- Recorded: 2010
- Genres: Alternative rock; electronic rock; acoustic rock; pop
- Length: 53:11
- Labels: Machine Shop; Warner Bros.
- Producer: Mike Shinoda Enrique Iglesias (co.)

Singles from Download to Donate for Haiti
- 1. "Not Alone" Released: January 19, 2010

Download to Donate for Haiti is a compilation album by various artists. It was released on January 19, 2010 through Machine Shop and Warner Bros. Records. The album was produced by Mike Shinoda and co-produced by Enrique Iglesias. American rock band Linkin Park started a project called Music for Relief in 2005, which has done relief work for the Indian Ocean tsunami in 2004, the 2010 Haiti earthquake, the 2011 Tōhoku earthquake and tsunami and Hurricane Sandy in 2012. Linkin Park released a single for the album titled as "Not Alone", which was recorded for their third studio album Minutes to Midnight, as the first and introductory track on this album. The single was released almost after two years of the release of the album, due to the release of their fourth album A Thousand Suns. This album is one of the albums released via Download to Donate.

In 2011, a sequel to the album, titled Download to Donate for Haiti V2.0, was released.

== Background ==
The project was started by Music for Relief, who is working alongside United Nations Foundation, Habitat for Humanity and the Dave Matthews Band's BAMA Works to provide food, water, medical supplies and sustainable housing for those affected by the 2010 Haiti earthquake. Mike Shinoda and Enrique Iglesias promoted the compilation on Larry King Live. The compilation has raised around $270,000 with 115,000 downloads.

== Track listing ==
#	Title	Performer(s)	Length
1	"Not Alone"	Linkin Park	4:12
2	"Mother Maria"	Slash featuring Beth Hart	5:35
3	"Never Let Me Down"	Kenna (produced by Mike Shinoda and Chad Hugo)	3:13
4	"Heroes"	Peter Gabriel	4:02
5	"Still" (Acoustic, Vancouver Sessions)	Alanis Morissette	5:33
6	"Resurrection"	Kenna featuring Lupe Fiasco (produced by Mike Shinoda)	4:07
7	"We Are One"	Hoobastank	4:47
8	"The Wind Blows" (Skrillex Remix)	The All-American Rejects	4:57
9	"It Must Be Love"	Enrique Iglesias	3:45
10	"Typical Situation" (Live)	Dave Matthews Band	12:58
11	"Make Tomorrow Today"	Peter Gabriel	4:10
12	"Slipstream" (Slimmed Down Mix)	The Crystal Method featuring Jason Lytle	5:30
13	"Gold Guns Girls (Mike Shinoda Remix)	Metric	5:12
14	"Times Like These" (Live from Red Rocks)	Jack Johnson	2:37
15	"Butterfly"	Weezer featuring Allison Allport	2:52
16	"Gargoyle" (Live)	Dinosaur Jr.	6:11
17	"Look Away"	Mickey Hart	5:58
18	"Jonah"	Guster	3:23
