= White Noise (Linkin Park song) =

2014 single by members of Linkin Park and Deadsy

Promotional single by Linkin Park and Alec Puro

from the album Mall: Music from the Motion Picture
- Released: October 17, 2014
- Recorded: 2013–2014
- Genre: Nu metal; alternative metal
- Length: 3:05
- Label: Warner Bros.; Machine Shop.
- Songwriters: Chester Bennington; Dave Farrell; Joe Hahn; Mike Shinoda
- Producer: Mike Shinoda

"White Noise" is a song by American rock musicians Chester Bennington, Dave Farrell, Joe Hahn, and Mike Shinoda of Linkin Park, and Alec Puro of Deadsy. Warner Bros. Records and Machine Shop Records released it on October 17, 2014.

The song promoted the 2014 American drama film Mall, based on Eric Bogosian’s novel of the same name. It is one of four unreleased Linkin Park demos included in the film’s soundtrack.

== Background ==
Linkin Park wrote “White Noise” as an unreleased demo during sessions for their sixth studio album, The Hunting Party. On October 15, 2014, the band announced that the song would feature in the opening credits of Mall. Two days later, the song became available for free download on the film’s official website as the first promotional single. Joe Hahn, in an interview, noted that he completed the film’s score before the band began recording The Hunting Party.

Due to the early DVD release of the film in France, half of “White Noise” leaked online, alongside three other unreleased demos: “It Goes Through,” “Devil’s Drop,” and “The Last Line,” known during production as “Luna,” “Warm Spell,” and “Ammosick,” respectively. The song retained its original title from the recording sessions. Although “White Noise” served as a promotional single, the film’s score focused more on the other three demos. “The Last Line” appeared on YouTube and as a digital download under the title “Mall: Theme Song.”

== Composition ==
Loudwire describes “White Noise” as featuring a distinctive toy piano sound in parts, with Chester Bennington’s intense vocals and a fast-paced tempo. At the film’s premiere, Mike Shinoda explained that Hahn selected ten unreleased Linkin Park demos from their career to form the basis of the soundtrack. He described Hahn’s choices as “raw” and “stream-of-consciousness” pieces, ideal for the film’s music.

Gary Graff, writing for 101 WRIF, noted that “White Noise” did not appear on The Hunting Party. Hahn, making his directorial debut with Mall after his short film The Seed, chose unreleased demos from Linkin Park’s earlier albums for the soundtrack, finding them a natural fit for the project.

There's three songs on the score that fit really well with what's going on and actually brought those particular themes to life as it pertains to those characters, and they resonated so much that they became themes throughout the film. So if you notice there's...a little piano that reoccurs that sounds like a kid's piano each time you see him. With different characters there's melodies or sound designs that correspond each time those things happen.

— Joe Hahn

== Track listing ==
Digital download
No.	Title	Writer(s)	Producer(s)	Length
1.	"White Noise"	Chester Bennington; Dave Farrell; Joe Hahn; Mike Shinoda	Mike Shinoda	3:05

== Release history ==
Region	Date	Format	Label
Worldwide	October 17, 2014	Digital download	Warner Bros.; Machine Shop.
