= Not Alone (Linkin Park song) =

Single by Linkin Park

from the album Download to Donate for Haiti
- Released: January 19, 2010
- Recorded: 2006–2010
- Length: 4:12
- Label: Warner Bros.; Machine Shop
- Songwriter: Linkin Park
- Producers: Mike Shinoda; Enrique Iglesias (co.)

Linkin Park singles chronology
"New Divide" (2009)	"Not Alone" (2010)	"The Catalyst" (2010)

Music video
- "Not Alone" on YouTube

"Not Alone" is a song written and recorded by American rock band Linkin Park from the compilation album, Download to Donate for Haiti. It was released as a charity single on January 19, 2010; accompanied by a music video released on February 19, 2010.

== Background ==
"Not Alone" was originally written for the band's third studio album Minutes to Midnight; unhappy with it, the members decided to shelve the song alongside thirty others. Upon the 2010 Haiti Earthquake which resulted in millions of lives affected by the tragedy, the band were motivated to revisit and finish "Not Alone" to be released as a charity single for those affected by the earthquake. "Not Alone" was released as the only single from the charity album Download to Donate for Haiti V2.0. The band's bassist Dave Farrell later visited Haiti in a humanitarian aid with the UN Foundation in April 2011.

== Composition ==
The song is a ballad with lyrics featuring themes such as solidarity and overcoming hardships. It blends the band's Alternative Rock sound with softer vibes and electronic sounds.

== Music video ==
The music video for "Not Alone" was released on YouTube on February 19, 2010 and was directed by Bill Boyd.

The music video contains United Nations footage during and the aftermath of the tragedy from those affected by the earthquake. During the video, it shows intertwining video footage of Linkin Park recording and composing on the song for the compilation album as the band's single: Chester Bennington recording the vocals, Mike Shinoda and Brad Delson composing the song while in recording session with the rest of the band, Rob Bourdon working on the drums, Dave "Phoenix" Farrell on the bass guitars, and Joe Hahn on the synthesizer.

== Track listing ==
Digital single
No.	Title	Producer(s)	Length
1.	"Not Alone"	Rick Rubin; Mike Shinoda	4:12

== Personnel ==
Linkin Park

- Chester Bennington – lead vocals
- Rob Bourdon – drums, percussion
- Brad Delson – guitars
- Dave "Phoenix" Farrell – bass guitars
- Joe Hahn – samplers, turntables
- Mike Shinoda – backing vocals, keyboards

== Release history ==
Release dates and formats for "Not Alone"
Region	Date	Format	Label	Ref.
Worldwide	January 19, 2010	Digital download	Warner Bros.; Machine Shop	
