= White Noise =

White noise is primarily a signal or sound with a flat frequency spectrum.

White Noise may also refer to:

== Literature ==
- White Noise (novel), a 1985 novel by Don DeLillo
- White Noise (play), a 2019 play by Suzan-Lori Parks

== Film and television ==
- White Noise, a 2004 film starring Rahul Bose
- White Noise (2005 film), a horror thriller film starring Michael Keaton
  - White Noise: The Light, the 2007 sequel
- White Noise (2020 film), a documentary film
- White Noise (2022 film), a black comedy film directed by Noah Baumbach based on the 1985 DeLillo book
- White Noise (The Morning Show), an episode of the American television series The Morning Show
- White Noise, a fictional character from The Venture Bros. episode "Powerless in the Face of Death" (2006)

== Music ==
- White Noise (band), an English electronic music band
- White Noise Records, an American record label
- The White Noise, an American post-hardcore music group
- White Noise: A Cautionary Musical, a rock musical, based on the real-life band Prussian Blue
- White Noise, a Scottish rock band formed by Doogie White

=== Albums ===
- White Noise (Cop Shoot Cop album), 1991
- White Noise (Gary Numan album), 2008
- White Noise (PVRIS album), or the title song, 2014
- White Noise (The Living End album), 2008
- Sound of White Noise, a 1993 album by Anthrax
- White Noise, a 2002 album by Alpinestars
- White Noise, a 2017 album by Noah Gundersen
- White Noise, a 2007 EP by David Sneddon

=== Songs ===
- "White Noise" (Disclosure song), 2013
- "White Noise" (Linkin Park song), 2014
- "White Noise" (The Living End song), 2008
- "White Noise" (Will Wood song), 2022
- "White Noise", by Antarctigo Vespucci from Love in the Time of E-Mail, 2018
- "White Noise", by Dawn of Solace from Flames of Perdition, 2022
- "White Noise", by Erra from Impulse, 2011
- "White Noise (백색소음)", by Exo from Ex'Act, 2016
- "White Noise", by FEMM from Femm-Isation, 2014
- "White Noise", by Holly Humberstone from Cruel World, 2026
- "White Noise", by James Marriott from Are We There Yet?, 2023
- "White Noise", by Lorna Shore from Psalms, 2015
- "White Noise", by Mogwai from Hardcore Will Never Die, but You Will, 2011
- "White Noise", by Steven Page from Discipline: Heal Thyself, Pt. II, 2018

== Other uses ==
- White noise machine, privacy and sleep aid that makes use of white noise or similar masking signals
- White Noise, name of the supporters group of the New Zealand national football team, All Whites
