= Mall (soundtrack) =

2014 soundtrack album

Mall: Music from the Motion Picture

Soundtrack album by Chester Bennington, Dave Farrell, Joe Hahn, Mike Shinoda and Alec Puro
- Released: December 12, 2014
- Recorded: 2011–2014
- Genre: Alternative rock; electronic rock; electronica; soundtrack; film score
- Length: 47:12
- Label: Warner Bros., Machine Shop
- Producer: Mike Shinoda, Joe Hahn, Alec Puro, Rick Rubin

Linkin Park chronology
The Hunting Party (2014)	Mall: Music from the Motion Picture (2014)	One More Light (2017)

Mall: Music from the Motion Picture is the original motion picture soundtrack for the 2014 American drama film Mall, consisting of songs written, recorded and performed by Chester Bennington, Dave Farrell, Joe Hahn and Mike Shinoda (from American rock band Linkin Park) with Alec Puro, drummer of American industrial rock band Deadsy. It was released through Warner Bros. and Machine Shop on December 12, 2014. The soundtrack was produced by Mike Shinoda and Brad Delson, along with Rob Cavallo and Bill Boyd, who both served as executive producers.

== Background ==
The music for the film was composed by Deadsy drummer Alec Puro and Linkin Park members Chester Bennington, Dave "Phoenix" Farrell, Joe Hahn and Mike Shinoda. The soundtrack for The Seed, the first installment by Hahn, contains three songs. One of them was "There They Go" by Fort Minor (originally from its studio debut album, The Rising Tied) played during the credits, and the other two were untitled and were played while the fighting scenes. It was rumored that the soundtrack for this film would have a few songs by Linkin Park and some would be from their new studio album The Hunting Party, but it was however proven to be false. The soundtrack for the film was released under the Warner Bros. and Machine Shop record labels on December 12, 2014.

In a tweet-out session, Joe answered the question about the score: "The movie is done! The score is finished! And we are putting it out to distributors and see who's going to put it out. So it's going to come soon." A song named as "It Goes Through", which Shinoda provides lead vocals on for the 2-minute trailer that was released on May 28, 2014, in promotion for Mall, was featured in the movie trailer, which could be the first single from the soundtrack of the film.

On September 16, 2014, the song "The Last Line" (originally known as "Ammosick"), under the name "Mall (Theme song)", was released through YouTube along with the download. This was also shared on the official page of the film.

On October 15, 2014, the band confirmed that the song "White Noise" is featured during the opening credits of Mall. On October 17, 2014, the song was available for free in digital download formatted in its entire length through the official Mall website. The song was released as a promotional single as a free download also at the website of the band. The song is also available on the band's official YouTube channel.

== Recording ==
The songs and score for the soundtrack were all recorded for the soundtrack from 2011 to 2013. The band recorded the soundtrack in parallel of recording their fifth studio album, Living Things (2012). The soundtrack was also recorded parallel to their second remix album Recharged (2013), and some sessions for their sixth studio album The Hunting Party (2014). Some songs were remastering of the demos by the band, which they had previously recorded.

The song "Devil's Drop" (originally known as "Warm Spell") was a demo during the recording sessions of Living Things, "It Goes Through" (originally known as "Luna") was one of the demos for the recordings of the EP written and composed by Shinoda for Dell's LP Stagelight, "White Noise" was a demo during the recording sessions of The Hunting Party, and "The Last Line" was a demo from the band's third studio album Minutes to Midnight (2007), but was worked on for their fourth studio album A Thousand Suns (2010), which is now released in digital download format, as it was confirmed on the official Facebook page to Mall.

== Track listing ==
All tracks are written by Joe Hahn and Alec Puro, except where noted; all songs produced by Hahn and Puro, except where noted.

MALL (Music from the Motion Picture)
No.	Title	Writer(s)	Producer(s)	Length
1.	"White Noise"	Chester Bennington, Joe Hahn, Dave Farrell, Mike Shinoda	Shinoda	3:05
2.	"Jeff Walks"			1:00
3.	"Mall Blueprint"			1:15
4.	"Jeff Makes Observations"			2:17
5.	"Mal RX7" (Instrumental)	Chester Bennington, Dave Farrell, Joe Hahn, Mike Shinoda	Shinoda	1:10
6.	"Barry's Story"			0:59
7.	"Changing Room Tease"			1:20
8.	"Danny in Police Car - Mal Gears Up"			1:43
9.	"Mal Gives Barry Second Chance - Mal Unloads"			2:29
10.	"Mall Carnage - Mal Stalked"			3:17
11.	"It Goes Through"	Chester Bennington, Dave Farrell, Joe Hahn, Mike Shinoda	Shinoda	3:15
12.	"Cops Arrive"			1:27
13.	"Danny's Lucky Day"			2:28
14.	"Jeff Philosophizes to Donna"			1:08
15.	"Jeff and Donna Connect"			0:54
16.	"Jeff Trips in the Mirror"			0:42
17.	"Adele and Danny in the Backseat"			2:35
18.	"Mal vs. Helicopter"			1:08
19.	"Devil's Drop"	Chester Bennington, Dave Farrell, Joe Hahn, Mike Shinoda	Shinoda	3:00
20.	"TV Comes to Life - Mal and Jeff"			4:20
21.	"The Last Line"	Chester Bennington, Dave Farrell, Joe Hahn, Mike Shinoda	Rick Rubin, Shinoda	3:41
22.	"Danny Goes Home"			1:41
23.	"Dancer" (Instrumental)	Chester Bennington, Dave Farrell, Joe Hahn, Mike Shinoda	Shinoda	3:18
Total length:				47:12

== Credits ==
- Music and performance by Chester Bennington, Dave Farrell, Joe Hahn, Mike Shinoda & Alec Puro
- Score produced by Mike Shinoda, Joe Hahn and Alec Puro
- Executive in Charge of Music for Paragon Pictures: Erika Hampson
- Music supervisor: The Collective
- Album compiled by M.P.S.E., Irl Sanders
- Art direction and design by Frank Maddocks
- Music recorded and mixed by Shie Rozow
- Music production services: Etan Mates
- Supervising music editor: Shie Rozow
- Additional music by Alaina Blair
- Music preparation: Ryan Neil
- Music contractors: Ryan Neil (from The Collective)
- Engineering: Ethan Mates
- Engineering assistants: Jennifer Langdon, Brendan Dekora and Alejandro Baima
- Synth programming: Mike Shinoda
- Mixing: Neal Avron
- Mastering: Emily Lazar, Brian "Big Bass" Gardner
- Mastering assistance: Rich Morales
- Lead vocals: Mike Shinoda
- Backing vocals: Mike Shinoda
- Vocals: Chester Bennington
- Guitars: Mike Shinoda
- Bass guitar: Dave "Phoenix" Farrell
- Drums: Alec Puro
- Turntables: Joe Hahn
- Keyboards: Mike Shinoda
- Sampling and programming: Joe Hahn and Mike Shinoda

== Release history ==
Region	Date	Format	Label
Australia	December 12, 2014	Digital download	Warner Bros. Records
Germany	December 12, 2014	Digital download	Warner Bros. Records
India	December 12, 2014	Digital download	Warner Bros. Records
Switzerland	December 12, 2014	Digital download	Warner Bros. Records
United Kingdom	December 12, 2014	Digital download	Warner Bros. Records
United States	December 12, 2014	Digital download	Warner Bros. Records, Machine Shop
Germany	December 15, 2014	DVD bundle	Warner Bros. Records
United States	December 15, 2014	DVD bundle	Warner Bros. Records/Machine Shop
