= Beta State =

American alternative rock band

- Origin: San Francisco, California, U.S.
- Genre: Alternative rock
- Years active: 2009-present
- Label: Machine Shop
- Spinoff of: Strata
- Members: Matt McDonald; Adrian Robison; Justin Kastner
- Past members: Ryan Hernandez
- Website: www.betastatemusic.com

Beta State is an American alternative rock band from the San Francisco Bay Area. Formed on September 1, 2009, with former members of Strata, they have gone on to release two full-length albums titled Stars and #Friendship and have opened for major acts such as Linkin Park, Green Day, The Strokes, Neon Trees, Airborne Toxic Event, Cage The Elephant, Florence + The Machine, Bush, Bad Religion, Mumford and Sons, Foster The People, Young The Giant, Manchester Orchestra, Awolnation, Innerpartysystem, and Dredg.

Beta State got the attention of Linkin Park's co-lead vocalist Mike Shinoda by working their way backstage and handing Shinoda an iPod Touch with all of their music pre-loaded onto the device. Shinoda blogged about it on his website saying they know "How to get attention the right way", referencing how they have never been given a demo from a band in this way.

Later on Beta State would end up recording a song with Linkin Park at Red Bull Studios, being featured on Linkin Park's LP Underground XIII record with their song "Change".
