= Machine Shop Records =

- Parent company: Machine Shop co.; Warner Music Group
- Founded: 2001 (as The Shinoda Imprint)
- Founder: Mike Shinoda; Brad Delson
- Status: Active
- Distributors: Warner Records (US); Warner Music Group (Int)
- Genre: Hip hop; underground hip hop; alternative metal; nu metal
- Country of origin: United States
- Location: Los Angeles, California
- Official website: machineshop.co

Machine Shop Records, also known as Machine Shop Recordings, is a record label founded by American rock band Linkin Park members Brad Delson and Mike Shinoda in 2001. The record label has released singles and albums in genres including rock, hip hop, underground hip hop, alternative rock and nu metal.

The label has signed several artists prior to their mainstream breakthroughs, including Holly Brook (whose name was later changed to Skylar Grey), Styles of Beyond, No Warning and Shinoda's side project Fort Minor.

== History ==
=== 1999–2002: Early years ===
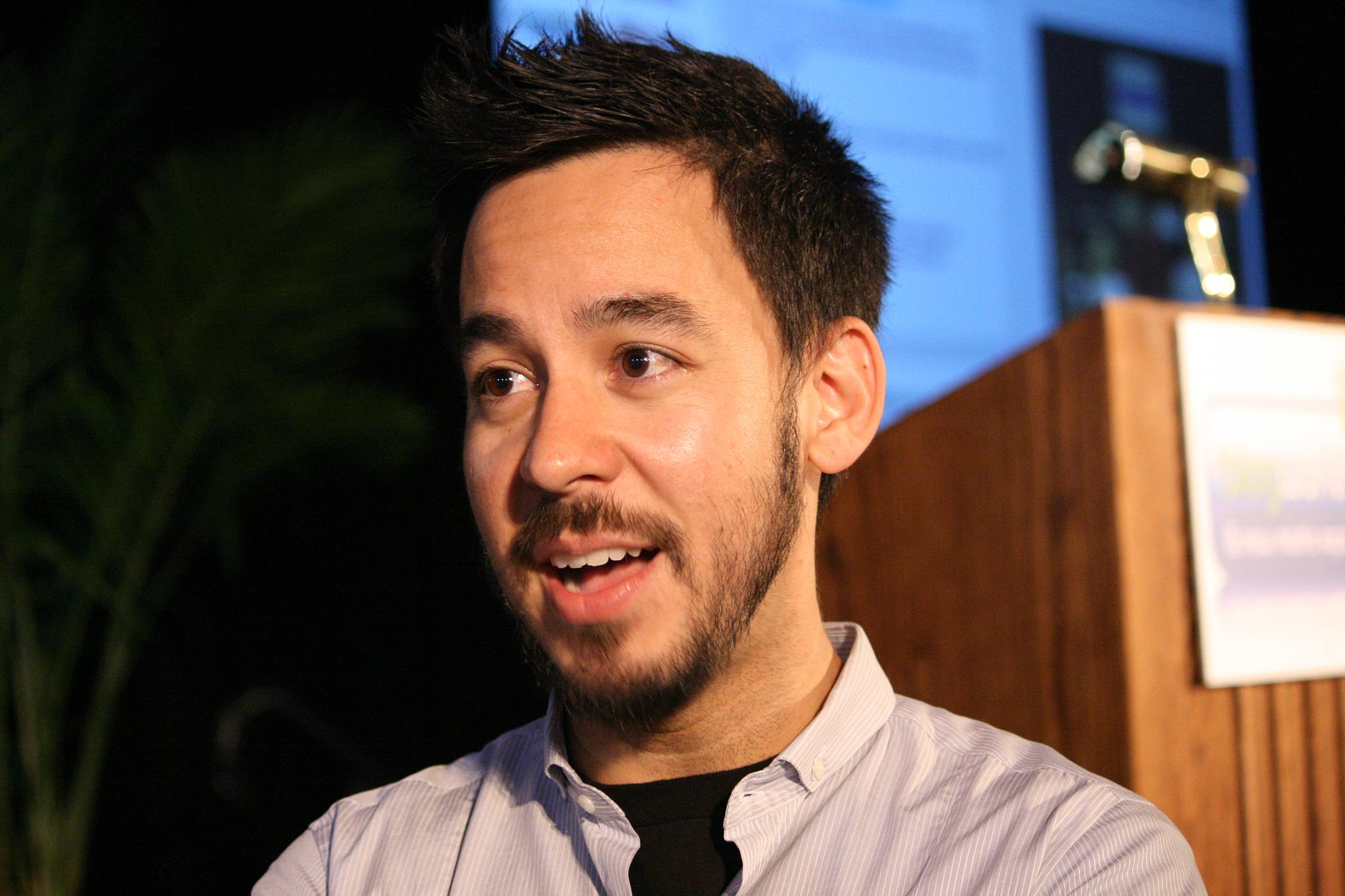
American multi instrumentalist Mike Shinoda - founder of Machine Shop Records - in 2008.

The label was originally known as The Shinoda Imprint, named after Mike Shinoda. Machine Shop was born in drummer Rob Bourdon's living room in 1999 when the band was packing CDs and stickers into boxes to send to their very first fans. The label only had the potential to release the extended plays for the band's fan club annually. Shinoda wanted to release albums of Linkin Park under the label, but the albums were already managed by the parent company Warner Bros. Records, and managing the albums on his alone basis was a difficult job. The first release under the label was for the fan club, LP Underground 2.0, which was released on November 18, 2002. The label also made available some enhanced features, such as T-shirts, sticker, key-chain, a band picture, guitar pick and membership card. The album was co produced by Don Gilmore with Shinoda. On November 17, 2003, the label released another extended play for the LPU fan club, entitled LP Underground 3.0, which featured the unreleased songs in the live album Live in Texas (which was released on November 18, 2003, through the record label).

=== 2003–07: Mainstream success ===
The label was later renamed to Machine Shop after the involvement of the band members in the work. Brad Delson took over the work as an A&R representative of the label. The label got the breakthrough success after the release of the overnight recorded collaborative EP by Jay-Z and Linkin Park, entitled Collision Course, which was released under the collaboration of labels, Roc-A-Fella, Warner Bros. and Machine Shop. The EP was released on November 30, 2004. The EP was certified as Platinum in America. Later the label signed artists like No Warning, Simplistic and LNDN. Suffer, Survive became the first non-Linkin Park album and non shared label album to be released under the label. It was released on October 19, 2004. The album featured only 10 songs. The songs like, Dirtier Than the Next, Bad Timing and Hopeless Case gave a breakthrough success to the band and indirectly to the label. On November 18, 2003, the live album by Linkin Park Live in Texas was released under the label and Warner Bros. which was also certified as Platinum. It was also released as a DVD which featured Chester Bennington breaking Brad Delson's guitar. At the end of the concert, Joe Hahn threw a piece of his equipment on the stage floor.

On November 22, 2005, the label again marked its success on releasing the album The Rising Tied by Fort Minor which was a side project by the founder Shinoda. Under the success of the album many artists like Styles of Beyond and Holly Brook were signed in the label. Holly Brook released two independent EPs Holly Brook EP and Sony CONNECT Sets under the label, whereas Styles of Beyond indirectly released singles in which they were featured through the project of Fort Minor. The singles by Fort Minor like Petrified/Remember the Name gave success to S.O.B. and Fort Minor. The breakthrough single Where'd You Go featuring Holly Brook marked number four on the Billboard Hot 100 making it the best ever debut song by any One-Hit-Wonder. The label meanwhile was also releasing EPs for Linkin Park Underground, and in addition it also released an EP for the fan club of Fort Minor, Militia. The label also released mixtapes like We Major and Razor Tag. The signing of S.O.B. brought the group back into the spotlight and marked success. On May 23, 2006, the label released Like Blood Like Honey by Holly Brook which was her debut album, which gave her the spot of #23 of U.S. Heat charts. In 2006, the label again gained spotlight after the single Numb/Encore by Linkin Park & Jay-Z won the Grammy Award for Best Rap/Sung Collaboration. On October 10, 2005, the label released a mixtape of its own which was named as Machine Shop Mixtape. It featured Various Artists like Taproot, Papa Roach, Deftones and many others.

=== Hiatus: 2007–2009 ===
Mike Shinoda has stated on his blog that, as of January 2009, Machine Shop Recordings will be on hiatus due to disagreements between the label and its parent company Warner Bros. Records. On 23 May 2010 Shinoda stated a new release was likely, suggesting that they are looking to the UK for new releases. The label then released the album only in America. The label then signed out artists like Holly Brook and Styles of Beyond, due to disagreements with Warner Bros. Records. Although there weren't many releases during this course of time, the label missed the release of the album Out of Ashes by Dead By Sunrise (a side project of Linkin Park vocalist Chester Bennington).

=== After hiatus: 2009–present ===
The first release by the label after hiatus is Download to Donate like Download to Donate for Haiti, Download to Donate for Haiti V2.0 and Download to Donate: Tsunami Relief. This project was handled by Shinoda and Enrique Iglesias. The first big release after hiatus is A Thousand Suns by Linkin Park which was released on September 14, 2010. The album landed on the top of Billboard 200 marking the return to the mainstream success of label. later the success was Living Things, Recharged and The Hunting Party which marked mainstream success in United States. In 2013 the label again released a non-Linkin Park album Resurrection of the Wolf only in US, No Warning after the band reunited. The label also released soundtrack album Mall. The label releases the singles by the band only in the United States, the release in other countries is released under the parent label. The label also released The Hunting Party outside the US for the first time after hiatus in Australia.

== Artists ==
=== Current acts ===
Act	Year signed	Releases under Machine Shop	Description
Linkin Park	2001	20	American rock band from Agoura Hills, California. They are the first artist signed under the label.
Dean DeLeo	2005	—	American guitarist known for his work with American rock band Stone Temple Pilots. He is also known for his role in the short-lived bands Talk Show and Army of Anyone. He became the second solo artist to sign under the label after Fort Minor, although he never released his own albums.
No Consequence	2009	3	Group inspired by the founder of the label Mike Shinoda.
LNDN	2011	2	Group from Chicago. Released two albums as a collaboration with Nass.
No Warning	2003	2	A hardcore punk band from Toronto, Ontario, Canada. The group became the second group to get signed under the label
Ryan Giles	2013	1	A solo artist who works with different bands and worked with Linkin Park on the track Truth Inside a Lie.
Beta State	2013	2	A four-piece San Francisco band formed in 2009. They have been working hard to break into mainstream success, playing for the likes of Linkin Park, The Strokes, Florence and the Machine, Young the Giant, Cage the Elephant, and The Manchester Orchestra.
Linkin Park Underground	2001	16	The official fan club of Linkin Park. They release a CD annually only for the fans of the band.
Fort Minor	2005	4	Side project by Mike Shinoda, which was on hiatus. It released a single under the label in June, 2015 titled "Welcome".

=== Former acts ===
Act	Years on the label	Releases under Machine Shop	Description
Styles of Beyond	2005–2007	1	Underground hip-hop group which was on hiatus until their departure in 2013.
Holly Brook	2005–2009	3	Solo artist who worked with Shinoda on the song "Where'd You Go".
Simplistic	2002–2005	1	A rock band from Sacramento California who signed the first development deal with Machine Shop Recordings in 2002. The band recorded an EP produced by Mike Shinoda in 2003. Simplistic's 4 song EP, "The Impact of Crashing" helped to acquire the label's distribution deal from Warner Brothers, but never received distribution itself. Despite recording more than 75 original songs between the EP and in their own studio in Sacramento, the band was never funded to release an album on the label. In 2004 while interviewing producers for the album, the group recorded a song with Danny Lohner (Nine Inch Nails / A Perfect Circle), but then disbanded in 2005 due to personal and creative differences.
The Rosewood Fall	2006	1	The group is now defunct.

=== Current producers ===
- Mike Shinoda
- Brad Delson
- Rob Cavallo

=== Past producers ===
- Rick Rubin
- Scoop DeVille
- DJ Green Lantern
- DJ Cheapshot
- Vin Skully
- Jay-Z

== Discography ==
The following is the list of all albums released through Machine Shop Records and distributed by Warner Bros. Records. Any additional record label involved are specified.

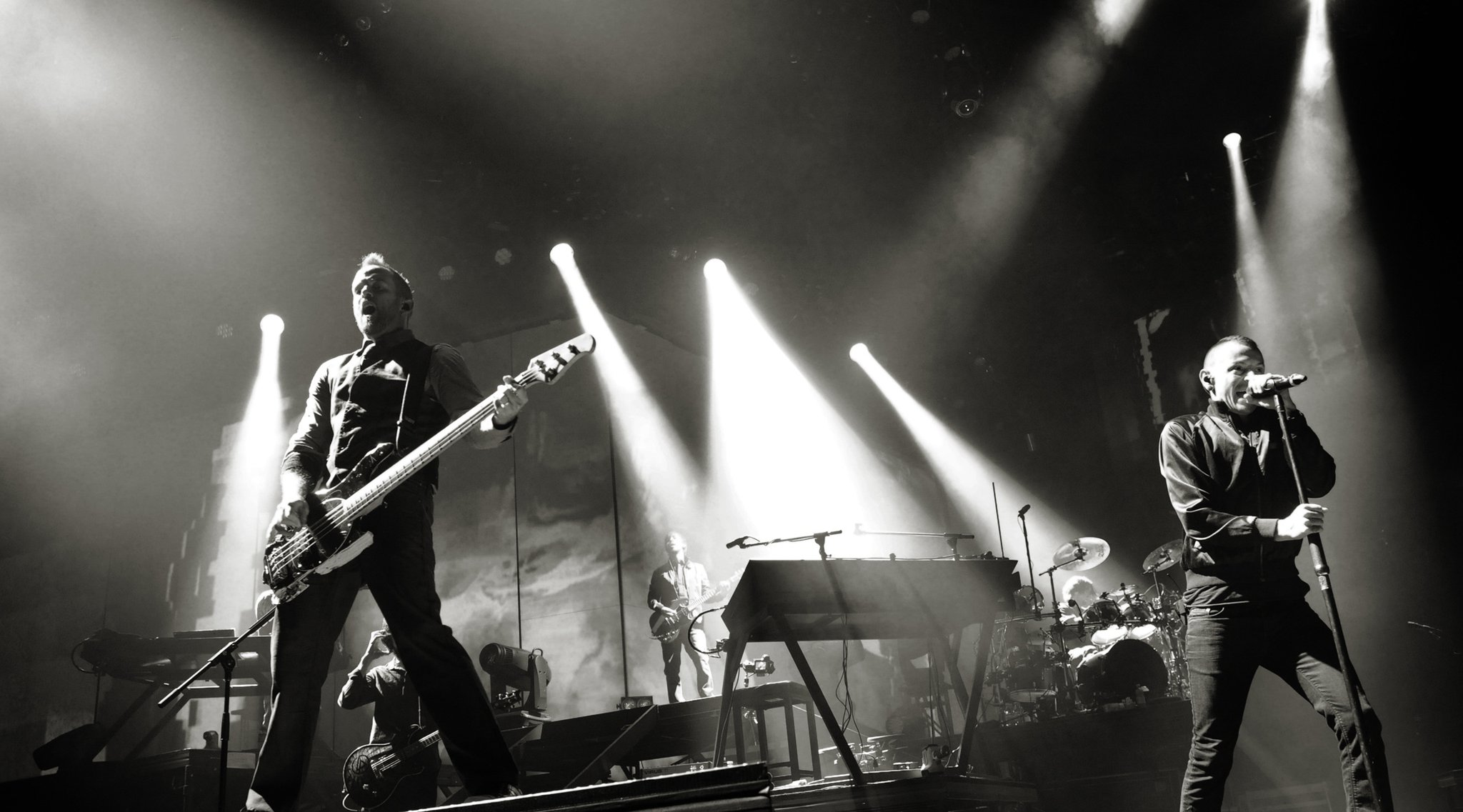
Linkin Park has got a total of 20 releases under the label.

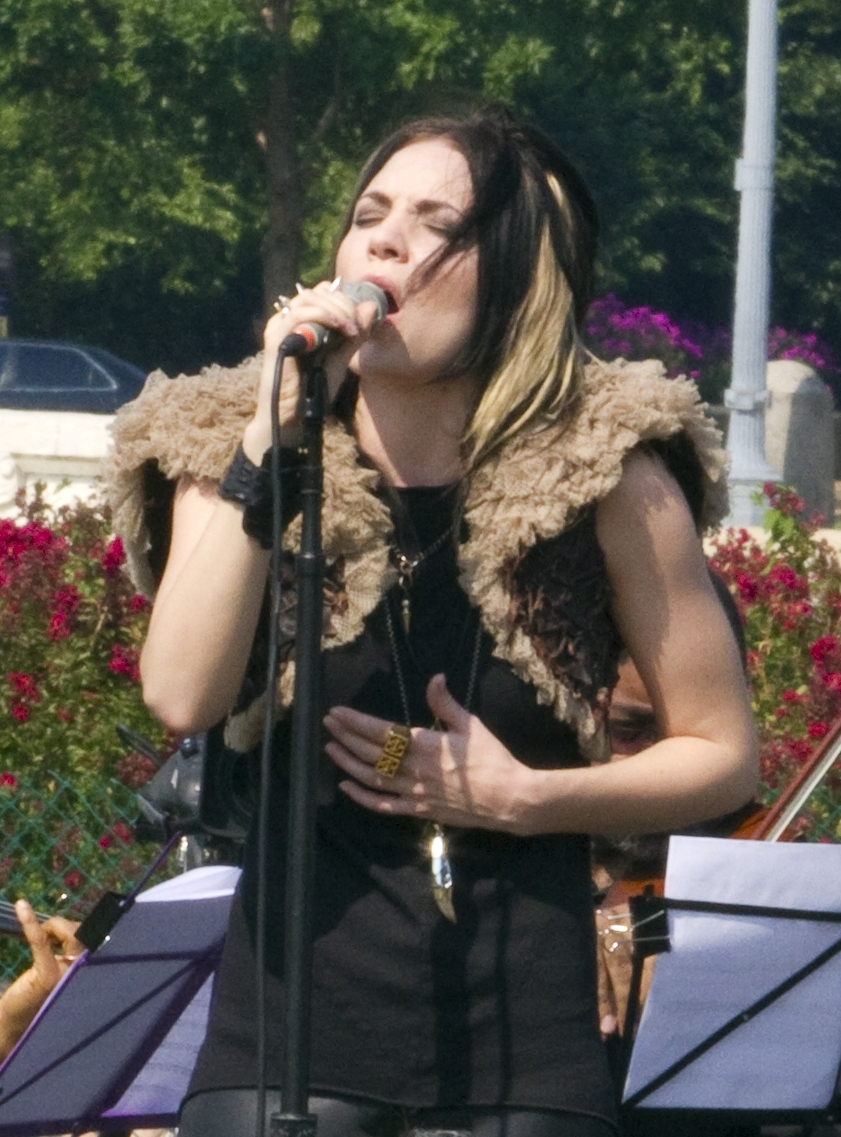
Skylar Grey released three albums on the label before leaving Machine Shop in 2009.

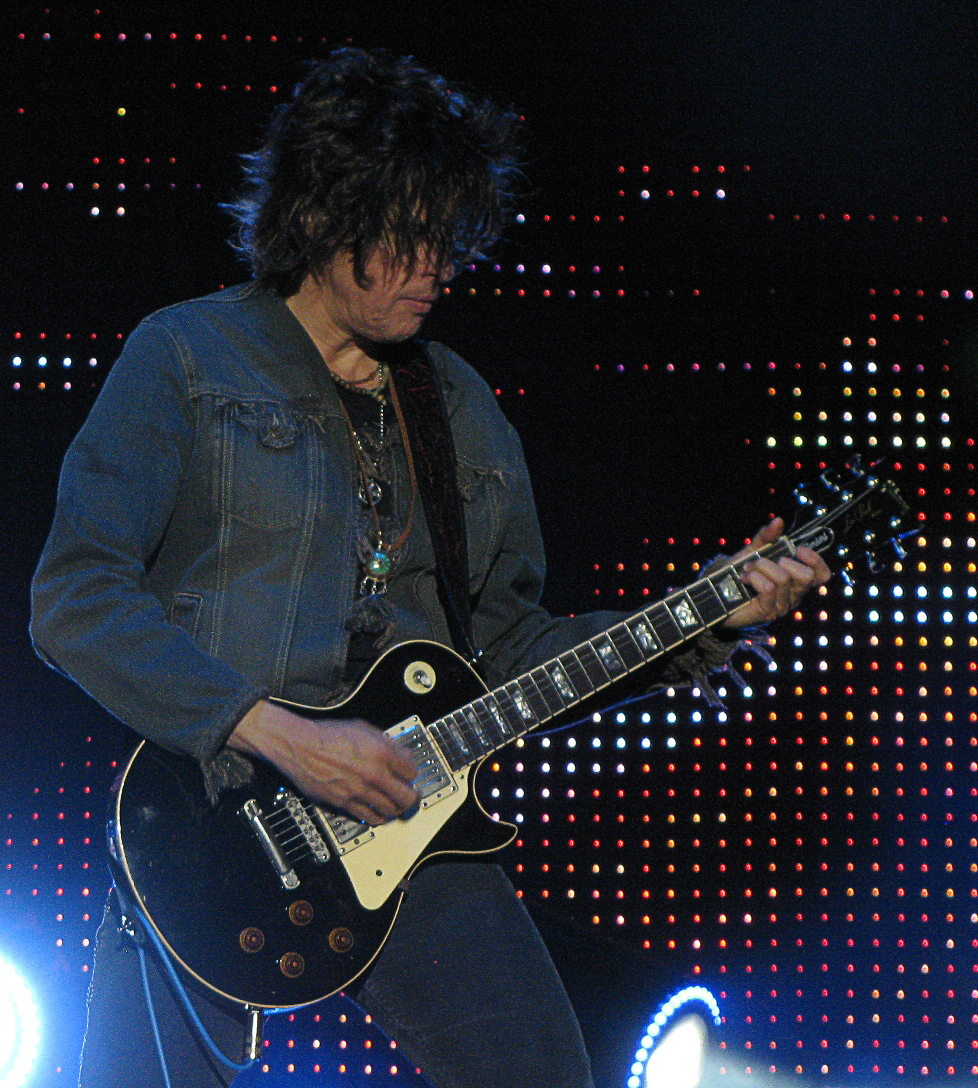
Dean DeLeo of Stone Temple Pilots is signed under the label, but didn't release any of his own albums.

Year	Artist	Album	Type	Details
2002	Linkin Park Underground	LP Underground 2.0	EP	Released: November 18, 2002
2003	Linkin Park	Meteora	Studio	Released: March 25, 2003; Chart Positions: #1 U.S.; RIAA Certification: 7× Platinum
2003	Linkin Park Underground	LP Underground 3.0	EP	Released: November 17, 2003
2003	Linkin Park	Live in Texas	Live	Released: November 18, 2003; Chart positions: #23 U.S.; RIAA certification: Platinum
2004	The Rosewood Fall	Demonstrate	Studio	Released: July 8, 2004; Chart positions: #105 U.S.
2004	No Warning	Suffer, Survive	Studio	Released: October 19, 2004; Chart positions: #55 U.S.
2004	Linkin Park Underground	LP Underground 4.0	EP	Released: November 22, 2004
2004	Jay-Z & Linkin Park	Collision Course (released with Roc-A-Fella)	EP	Released: November 30, 2004; Chart position: #1 U.S.; RIAA certification: 2× Platinum
2005	Fort Minor	Instrumental Album: The Rising Tied	Digital	Released: January 1, 2005
2005	Various Artists	Machine Shop Mixtape	Mixtape	Released: October 4, 2005
2005	Skylar Grey	Holly Brook EP	EP	Released: October 11, 2005
2005	Skylar Grey	Sony CONNECT Sets	EP	Released: October 29, 2005
2005	Fort Minor	Fort Minor: We Major	Mixtape	Released: October 30, 2005
2005	Linkin Park Underground	LP Underground 5.0	EP	Released: November 21, 2005
2005	Fort Minor	The Rising Tied	Studio	Released: November 22, 2005; Chart Positions: #51 U.S.; RIAA certification: Platinum
2006	Skylar Grey	Like Blood Like Honey	Studio	Released: May 23, 2006; Chart Positions: #26 U.S. Heat
2006	Fort Minor	Sessions@AOL	Live/EP	Released: July 18, 2006; Chart Positions: #10 Jpn
2006	Fort Minor	Militia	EP	Released: November 22, 2006
2006	Linkin Park Underground	LP Underground 6.0	EP	Released: December 5, 2006
2007	Linkin Park	Minutes to Midnight	Studio	Released: May 14, 2007; Chart Positions: #1 U.S.; RIAA Certification: 4× Platinum
2007	Styles of Beyond	Razor Tag	Mixtape	Released: July 30, 2007
2007	Linkin Park Underground	LP Underground 7.0	EP/Live	Released: December 5, 2007
2008	Linkin Park	Road to Revolution: Live at Milton Keynes	Live	Released: November 21, 2008; Chart Positions: #41 U.S.
2009	No Consequence	In the Shadow of Gods (released with Basick)	Studio	Released: 17 August 2009
2009	Linkin Park Underground	LP Underground 9.0: Demos	Demo	Released: December 3, 2009; Chart Positions: 73 Austria; 66 Germany; 29 New Zealand
2010	Various Artists	Download to Donate for Haiti	Compilation	Released: January 19, 2010
2010	Linkin Park	A Thousand Suns	Studio	Released: September 15, 2010; Chart Position: #1 U.S.; RIAA Certification: Platinum
2010	Linkin Park Underground	LP Underground X: Demos	Compilation/Demo	Released: November 17, 2010
2011	Various Artists	Download to Donate for Haiti V2.0	Compilation	Released: January 11, 2011
2011	Various Artists	Download to Donate: Tsunami Relief	Compilation	Released: March 22, 2011
2011	Linkin Park Underground	LP Underground 11	Demo	Released: November 15, 2011
2012	Linkin Park	Living Things	Studio	Released: June 26, 2012; Chart Positions: #1 U.S.; RIAA Certification: Platinum
2012	Linkin Park Underground	LP Underground 12	Demo	Released: November 16, 2012
2013	No Consequence	IO (released with Basick and Invictus Records)	Studio	Released: January 1, 2013; Chart Positions: #72 U.S.
2013	Beta State	#Friendship - Deluxe Edition	Reissue	Released: May 21, 2013
2013	Linkin Park	Recharged	Remix	Released: October 29, 2013; Chart Positions: #10 U.S.
2013	Linkin Park Underground	LP Underground XIII	Demo	Released: November 18, 2013
2014	No Warning	Resurrection of the Wolf (released with Bridge 9)	Studio	Released: February 18, 2014
2014	Linkin Park	The Hunting Party	Studio	Released: June 13, 2014; Chart Positions: #3 U.S.; RIAA Certification: Platinum
2014	Linkin Park Underground	LP Underground XIV	Demo	Released: November 21, 2014
2014	Linkin Park & Alec Puro	Mall: Music from the Motion Picture	Soundtrack	Released: December 12, 2014
2015	Linkin Park Underground	LP Underground 15	Demo	Released: November 25, 2015
2016	Linkin Park Underground	LP Underground Sixteen	Demo	Released: November 21, 2016
2017	Linkin Park	One More Light	Studio	Release date: May 19, 2017; Chart Positions: #1 U.S.; RIAA Certification: Gold
2017	Linkin Park	One More Light Live	Live	Released: December 15, 2017
2018	Mike Shinoda	Post Traumatic (EP)	EP	Released: January 25, 2018
2018	Mike Shinoda	Post Traumatic	Studio	Released: June 15, 2018; Chart Positions: #16 U.S.
2020	Linkin Park	Hybrid Theory 20th Anniversary Edition	Compilation	Released: October 9, 2020
2023	Linkin Park	Meteora 20th Anniversary Edition	Compilation	Released: April 7, 2023
2024	Linkin Park	Papercuts (Singles Collection 2000–2023)	Greatest Hits	Released: April 12, 2024
2024	Linkin Park	From Zero	Studio	Released: November 15, 2024

=== Upcoming releases ===
List of upcoming releases
Artist	Album details
No Consequence	Title: TBA; Release date: TBA

== Crew and employees ==
- Mike Shinoda - Founder, President
- Brad Delson - Founder, President
- Bill Silva - Chief Operating Officer
- Jessica Sklar - Chief Strategy Officer, Partner
- Ryan DeMarti - Director of Operations
- Trish Evangelista - Project Manager
- Lorenzo Errico - Digital Manager
- Kymm Britton – publicity
- Kas Mercer – publicity

== See also ==
- List of record labels
