= Chiraa =

- Country: Ghana
- Region: Bono Region

Chiraa is a town in the Bono Region of Ghana. The town is known for the Chiraa High School. The school is a second cycle institution. Chiraa is part of the Sunyani West District. ^{[5]}
