= The Seed (2006 film) =

- Film poster
- Directed by: Joe Hahn
- Screenplay by: Christopher Denham
- Produced by: Joe Hahn; Matt Caltabiano
- Starring: Will Yun Lee; Peter Mensah
- Cinematography: Richard Henkels
- Edited by: Mario Mares, Jr. Mike Barnett
- Release date: October 2006 (Busan)
- Running time: 12 minutes
- Country: United States
- Language: English

The Seed is a 2006 short-film starring Will Yun Lee and Peter Mensah, produced and directed by Joe Hahn of Linkin Park and written by Christopher Denham.

The film premiered at the 2006 Busan International Film Festival.

== Synopsis ==
The Seed follows the events surrounding a homeless veteran named Sung, who is portrayed by Will Yun Lee. Living along the banks of the Los Angeles River, he is attacked by masked men in black vehicles, invisible to the eye. To any passers-by, Sung appears to have some sort of mental illness, but as he is chased throughout the city, it is revealed to the audience that he is not in fact paranoid, but rather the victim of a government conspiracy. Sung's adversaries are visible to him, yet only visible to the audience part of the time. At the end of the film, an alien ship is visible in the sky, watching the scene.

== Release ==
The Seed was first released at the Busan International Film Festival in 2006. It was also shown at the Festivus Film Festival in Denver, Colorado where it won "Best Short Short" in 2008. The Seed was awarded the "Outstanding Cinematography" award at the 2007 Veneration Film Festival in Newport. Later in 2008, The Seed will be entered at various festivals including the Swansea Bay Film Festival in England, the San Francisco International Asian American Film Festival, the Beverly Hills Film Festival, the Malibu Film Festival, and the Los Angeles United Film Festival.

== Soundtrack ==
The soundtrack for The Seed featured three songs. One of them was "There They Go" by Fort Minor (originally from the B-side of "Believe Me") played during the credits, and the other two were untitled as they were played in the fighting scenes.
