= Music for Relief =

Charitable trust

Music for Relief is a 501(c)(3) charitable trust founded by the rock band Linkin Park in response to the 2004 Indian Ocean tsunami. In March 2018, Music for Relief announced its collaboration with the Entertainment Industry Foundation.
