= Download to Donate =

Music for Relief program

Download to Donate is a program by Music for Relief, a non-profit organization established by Linkin Park in 2005 to aid victims of natural disasters in their recovery efforts. So far, the program has released three compilations: two to support the 2010 earthquake in Haiti and one for the 2011 Tōhoku earthquake and tsunami. Several artists contribute songs to the compilations, and people are encouraged to either download the songs, in which the proceeds will go to relief efforts for the disasters; or to simply donate any amount money for the cause.

== Download to Donate for Haiti ==
Download to Donate for Haiti is a compilation album by Music for Relief, who is working alongside United Nations Foundation, Habitat for Humanity and the Dave Matthews Band's BAMA Works to provide food, water, medical supplies and sustainable housing for those affected by the 2010 Haiti earthquake. Mike Shinoda and Enrique Iglesias promoted the compilation on Larry King Live. The compilation has raised around $270,000 with 115,000 downloads.

== Download to Donate for Haiti V2.0 ==
On the Music for Relief official website, it is revealed that there will be an updated version/sequel of Download to Donate for Haiti, called Download to Donate for Haiti V2.0, to be released on January 11, 2011. Some of the tracks from the first Download to Donate for Haiti are included in the album. The cause has raised more than $26,000. The donations will support Artists for Peace and Justice, charity: water, Direct Relief, Partners In Health and the United Nations Foundation, as well as reconstruction and the delivery of food, water and medical care in Haiti.

On February 22, 2011, Linkin Park members Chester Bennington, Brad Delson, Joe Hahn and Rob Bourdon joined United Nations Secretary General Ban Ki-moon in a Facebook Town Hall discussion on how they continue their work on raising efforts on awareness of Haiti. Fans were also encouraged to participate in the Download to Donate campaign.

The songs were no longer available for download from December 10, 2011. Music for Relief selected the Haitian Education and Leadership Program, or HELP, a program that gives higher education to young Haitians, as the final beneficiary of funds raised through Download to Donate for Haiti v2.0. Music for Relief still accepts donations for Haiti.

== Download to Donate: Tsunami Relief ==
Download to Donate: Tsunami Relief (sometimes known as Download to Donate for Japan), launched on March 22, 2011, was the third Download to Donate compilation album. The proceeds for downloading the songs went to Save the Children, which helped the victims of the 2011 Tōhoku earthquake and tsunami. The songs were no longer available for download as of June 7, 2011.
