= Studio Collection 2000–2012 =

Studio Collection

Box set by Linkin Park
- Released: January 15, 2013
- Recorded: 2000–2012
- Label: Warner Bros.
- Producers: Don Gilmore; Jeff Blue; Linkin Park; Mike Shinoda; Rick Rubin

Linkin Park chronology
Living Things (2012)	Studio Collection (2013)	Recharged (2013)

Studio Collection, released under the name of Studio Collection 2000–2012, is a box set of studio albums released by American rock band Linkin Park in 2013. The set consists of their first five studio albums and their 2002 remix album Reanimation, each one containing the main track list.

== Track listing ==
Disc 1 – Hybrid Theory

1. "Papercut" – 3:04
2. "One Step Closer" – 2:35
3. "With You" – 3:23
4. "Points of Authority" – 3:20
5. "Crawling" – 3:29
6. "Runaway" – 3:03
7. "By Myself" – 3:09
8. "In the End" – 3:36
9. "A Place for My Head" – 3:04
10. "Forgotten" – 3:14
11. "Cure for the Itch" – 2:37
12. "Pushing Me Away" – 3:11

Disc 2 – Meteora

1. "Foreword" – 0:13
2. "Don't Stay" – 3:07
3. "Somewhere I Belong" – 3:33
4. "Lying from You" – 2:55
5. "Hit the Floor" – 2:44
6. "Easier to Run" – 3:24
7. "Faint" – 2:42
8. "Figure.09" – 3:17
9. "Breaking the Habit" – 3:16
10. "From the Inside" – 2:55
11. "Nobody's Listening" – 2:58
12. "Session" – 2:24
13. "Numb" – 3:07

Disc 3 – Reanimation

1. "Opening" – 1:07
2. "Pts.OF.Athrty" – 3:45
3. "Enth E ND" – 4:00
4. "[Chali]" – 0:23
5. "Frgt/10" – 3:32
6. "P5hng Me A*wy" – 4:38
7. "Plc.4 Mie Hæd" – 4:20
8. "X-Ecutioner Style" – 1:49
9. "H! Vltg3" – 3:30
10. "[Riff Raff]" – 0:21
11. "Wth>You" – 4:12
12. "Ntr\Mssion" – 0:29
13. "Ppr:Kut" – 3:26
14. "Rnw@y" – 3:13
15. "My<Dsmbr" – 4:17
16. "[Stef]" – 0:10
17. "By_Myslf" – 3:42
18. "Kyur4 th Ich" – 2:32
19. "1Stp Klosr" – 5:46
20. "Krwlng" – 5:40

Disc 4 - Minutes to Midnight

1. "Wake" – 1:40
2. "Given Up" – 3:09
3. "Leave Out All the Rest" – 3:29
4. "Bleed It Out" – 2:44
5. "Shadow of the Day" – 4:49
6. "What I've Done" – 3:25
7. "Hands Held High" – 3:53
8. "No More Sorrow" – 3:41
9. "Valentine's Day" – 3:16
10. "In Between" – 3:16
11. "In Pieces" – 3:38
12. "The Little Things Give You Away" – 6:23

Disc 5 – A Thousand Suns

1. "The Requiem" – 2:01
2. "The Radiance" – 0:57
3. "Burning in the Skies" – 4:13
4. "Empty Spaces" – 0:18
5. "When They Come for Me" – 4:55
6. "Robot Boy" – 4:28
7. "Jornada Del Muerto" – 1:34
8. "Waiting for the End" – 3:51
9. "Blackout" – 4:39
10. "Wretches and Kings" – 4:15
11. "Wisdom, Justice, and Love" – 1:38
12. "Iridescent" – 4:56
13. "Fallout" – 1:23
14. "The Catalyst" – 5:39
15. "The Messenger" – 3:01

Disc 6 – Living Things

1. "Lost in the Echo" – 3:25
2. "In My Remains" – 3:20
3. "Burn It Down" – 3:50
4. "Lies Greed Misery" – 2:27
5. "I'll Be Gone" – 3:31
6. "Castle of Glass" – 3:25
7. "Victimized" – 1:46
8. "Roads Untraveled" – 3:49
9. "Skin to Bone" – 2:48
10. "Until It Breaks" – 3:43
11. "Tinfoil" – 1:11
12. "Powerless" – 3:44

== Credits ==
Linkin Park

- Chester Bennington – lead vocals (except on "Cure for the Itch", "Foreword", "Session", "Wake", "Hands Held High", "The Requiem", "The Radiance", "Empty Spaces", "When They Come for Me", "Wisdom, Justice, and Love" and "Fallout"); rhythm guitar (on "Shadow of the Day" and "Iridescent"); vocals (on "When They Come for Me"); beatbox (on "Points of Authority"); additional percussion (on "When They Come for Me" and "Blackout"); backing vocals (on "When They Come for Me" and "Lost in the Echo"); additional vocals (on "Hands Held High" and "In Between")
- Rob Bourdon – drums, percussion, backing vocals
- Brad Delson – lead guitar, bass guitar, and backing vocals; rhythm guitar (on "Burning in the Skies"); acoustic guitar (on "The Messenger" and "Castle of Glass"); additional percussion (on "When They Come for Me", "Blackout" and "The Catalyst"), megaphone (on "When They Come for Me")
- Dave "Phoenix" Farrell – bass guitar (except on "Hybrid Theory" tracks); backing vocals; additional keyboard (on "Blackout")
- Joe Hahn – turntables, samples, scratching, programming, backing vocals
- Mike Shinoda – lead and rap vocals; rhythm guitar (on "Crawling", "Pushing Me Away", "Somewhere I Belong", "Hit the Floor", "Easier to Run", "Faint", "From the Inside", "P5hng Me A*wy", "Wth>You", "Wake", "Given Up", "Bleed It Out", "What I've Done", "No More Sorrow", "Valentine's Day", "In Pieces", "The Little Things Give You Away", "Waiting for the End", "Lost in the Echo", "In My Remains", "Lies Greed Misery", "I'll Be Gone", "Castle of Glass", "Victimized", "Roads Untraveled" and "Powerless"); lead guitar (on "Burning in the Skies"); acoustic guitar (on "The Little Things Give You Away"); vocoder (on "The Requiem" and "Fallout"); beatbox (on "Points of Authority"); keyboard, piano, sampler, synthesizer

=== Disc 1 ===
Additional musicians

- Ian Hornbeck – additional bass (on tracks 1, 9 and 10)
- Scott Koziol – additional bass (on One Step Closer)
- Mark Wakefield – former vocalist (credit given on tracks 6, 9 and 10)
- The Dust Brothers – sequencing, samples (on track 3)

Artwork

- Frank Maddocks – graphic design
- James Minchin III – photography
- Mike Shinoda – soldier drawing, line art sketches, drawings
- Joe Hahn – line art sketches, drawings

Production

- Don Gilmore – producer, engineering
- Steve Sisco – Engineering
- John Ewing Jr. – Additional engineering, Pro Tools
- Matt Griffin – Engineering assistance
- Andy Wallace – mixing
- Brian Gardner – Audio mastering, digital editing

Management

- Jeff Blue – A&R, executive producer
- Natalie Preston & Arriana Murray – A&R Coordination
- Michael Arfin – Booking agent for Artist Group
- Michael Oppenhein & Jonathan Schwart – Business managers for Gudvi, Chapnik & Oppenhein
- Danny Hayes – Legal for Selverne, Mandelbaum and Mintz
- Petter Standish – Marketing director
- Rob Mcdermott – World representation for The Firm

=== Disc 2 ===
Additional musicians

- David Campbell – Strings arrangement on "Faint" and "Breaking the Habit"
- Joel Derouin, Charlie Bisharat, Alyssa Park, Sara Parkins, Michelle Richards, Mark Robertson – Violins
- Evan Wilson, Bob Becker – Violas
- Larry Corbett, Dan Smith – Celli
- David Zasloff – shakuhachi flute on "Nobody's Listening"

Production

- Produced by Don Gilmore and Linkin Park
- Recorded by Don Gilmore
- EnrJohn Ewing Jr. – Engineer
- Fox Phelps – Assistant engineer
- Andy Wallace – Mixing at Soundtrack Studios, New York City
- Steve Sisco – Assisted mixing
- Brian "Big Bass" Gardner – Mastering, digital editing at Bernie Grundman Mastering

Management

- Tom Whalley & Jeff Blue – A&R
- Marny Cameron – A&R coordination
- Peter Standish & Kevin Sakoda – Marketing directors
- Worldwide representation: Rob McDermott for the Firm with Additional Servitude by Ryan Saullo, Ryan Demarti, and Noah Edelman
- Booking agent: Michael Arfin for Artist Group, International
- Danny Hayes – Legal for Davis, Shapiro, Lewit, Montone & Hayes
- Michael Oppenheim & Jonathan Schwartz – Business Managers for Gudvi, Sussman & Oppenheim
- Worldwide licensing and merchandising: Bandmerch

Artwork

- Mike Shinoda & The Flem – Creative direction
- The Flem – Art direction & design
- Delta, Mike Shinoda, Joseph Hahn & The Flem – Installation artists
- James R. Minchin III – Photography
- Nick Spanos – Spray paint can close-up photos

=== Disc 3 ===
Production

- Don Gilmore – producer (original recordings)
- Andy Wallace – mixing (original recordings)
- Mike Shinoda – producer, art direction, design, art
- Mark "Spike" Stent – mixing
- David Treahearn – mixing assistant
- Paul "P-Dub" Walton – ProTools engineer
- Brian "Big Bass" Gardner – mastering, digital editing
- Nancie Stern – sample clearance
- Tom Whalley – A&R
- Kevin Sakoda – A&R, marketing director
- Jeff Blue – A&R
- Natalie Preston – A&R coordination
- Peter Standish – marketing director
- Rob McDermott – worldwide representation
- Clay Patrick McBride – photography
- Flem – art direction, design
- Joseph Hahn – art

Additional musicians and interpretations

- Jay Gordon – interpretation on "Pts.OF.Athrty"
- Nova – programming, interpretation on "Pts.OF.Athrty"
- Doug Trantow – additional programming, additional producer, engineer on "Pts.OF.Athrty"
- KutMasta Kurt – interpretation on "Enth E Nd"
- Motion Man – vocals on "Enth E Nd"
- The Alchemist – interpretation on "Frgt/10"
- Chali 2na – vocals on "Frgt/10"
- Stephen Richards – vocals on "P5hng Me A*wy"
- AmpLive – interpretation on "Plc.4 Mie Hæd"
- Baba Zumbi – vocals on "Plc.4 Mie Hæd"
- Sean C – producer on "X-Ecutioner Style"
- Roc Raida – interpretation on "X-Ecutioner Style"
- Black Thought – vocals on "X-Ecutioner Style"
- Jeff Chestek – engineer on "X-Ecutioner Style"
- Ray Wilson – assistant engineer on "X-Ecutioner Style"
- Evidence – interpretation on "H! Vltg3"
- Pharoahe Monch – vocals on "H! Vltg3"
- DJ Babu – cut on "H! Vltg3"
- Porse 1 – additional production on "H! Vltg3"
- DJ Revolution – editing on "H! Vltg3"
- Troy Staton – mixing on "H! Vltg3"
- Aceyalone – vocals on "Wth>You"
- Cheapshot – interpretation on "Ppr:Kut"
- Jubacca (Vin Skully) – interpretation on "Ppr:Kut"
- Rasco – vocals on "Ppr:Kut"
- Planet Asia – vocals on "Ppr:Kut"
- Josh Kouzomis – interpretation on "Rnw@y"
- E.Moss – interpretation on "Rnw@y"
- Phoenix Orion – vocals on "Rnw@y"
- Mickey Petralia – additional production on "Rnw@y"; keyboards, programming, producer, interpretation on "My<Dsmbr"
- Michael Fitzpatrick - programming, interpretation on "My<Dsmbr"
- Kelli Ali - vocals on "My<Dsmbr"
- Greg Kurstin - keyboards on "My<Dsmbr"
- Josh Abraham - interpretation on "By_Myslf"
- Stephen Carpenter - guitar on "By_Myslf"
- Ryan Williams - engineer on "By_Myslf"
- Jonas G. - engineer on "By_Myslf"
- Erik Gregory - programming on "By_Myslf"
- The Humble Brothers - interpretation on "1stp Klosr"
- Jonathan Davis – vocals on "1stp Klosr"
- Aaron Lewis – vocals on "Krwlng"

=== Disc 4 ===
Production

- Rick Rubin – production
- Dana Nielsen, Andrew Scheps and Ethan Mates – engineering
- Phillip Broussard Jr. – engineer assisting
- Neal Avron – mixing
- Nicolas Fournier and George Gumbs – mixing assisting
- Dave Collins – mastering

Guest musicians on tracks 3, 5, 7 and 12

- David Campbell – string arrangements and conducting
- Charlie Bisharat – violin
- Mario DeLeon – violin
- Armen Garabedian – violin
- Julian Hallmark – violin
- Gerry Hilera – violin
- Songa Lee-Kitto – violin
- Natalie Leggett – violin
- Josefina Vergara – violin
- Sara Parkins – violin
- Matt Funes – viola
- Andrew Picken – viola
- Larry Corbett – cello
- Suzie Katayama – cello
- Oscar Hidalgo – bass

=== Disc 5 ===
Production

- Rick Rubin – producer
- Mike Shinoda – producer, engineer, creative director, Pro Tools
- Neal Avron – mixing
- Kymm Britton – publicity
- Anton Brooks – publicity
- Lindsay Chase – production coordination
- Brad Delson – Pro Tools
- Ryan DeMarti – production coordination, A&R
- Nicolas Fournier – assistant
- Joe Hahn – creative director
- Jerry Johnson – drum technician
- Liza Joseph – A&R
- Frank Maddocks – art direction, design, creative director
- Ethan Mates – engineer, Pro Tools
- Vlado Meller – mastering
- Josh Newell – engineer, Pro Tools
- Czeslaw "NoBraiN" Sakowski – programming
- Mark Santangelo – assistant
- Peter Standish – marketing
- Josh Vanover – artwork, creative director
- Ellen Wakayama – creative director
- Tom Whalley – A&R

=== Disc 6 ===
Additional musicians

- Owen Pallett – strings on "I'll Be Gone"

Technical personnel

- Rick Rubin – producer
- Mike Shinoda – producer, engineer, creative director
- Joe Hahn – creative director
- Ethan Mates – engineer
- Andrew Hayes – assistant, engineer, editor
- Brad Delson – additional production
- Jerry Johnson – drum technician
- Ryan DeMarti – production coordination, A&R coordination
- Manny Marroquin – mixing (assisted by Chris Galland and Del Bowers)
- Brian Gardner – mastering
- Rob Cavallo – A&R
- Liza Jospeph – A&R coordination
- Peter Standish – marketing director
- Brandon Parvini – artwork, creative director
- The Uprising Creative – art direction, design
- Frank Maddocks – LP icon design

Source: AllMusic.

== Charts ==
Chart (2017)	Peak position
Australian Albums (ARIA)	49
