= Living Things World Tour =

2012–13 concert tour by Linkin Park

- Tour by Linkin Park
- Promotional poster for tour
- Location: Europe; North America; South America; Africa; Oceania; Asia
- Associated album: Living Things
- Start date: May 26, 2012
- End date: August 19, 2013
- Legs: 4
- No. of shows: 34
- Supporting acts: Vetamadre (Buenos Aires); Charlie Brown Jr. (São Paulo); Reação em Cadeia (Porto Alegre); Kongos (South Africa); Stone Sour (Oceania)
Linkin Park tour chronology
11th Annual Honda Civic Tour (2012)	Living Things World Tour (2012–2013)	Carnivores Tour (2014)

The Living Things World Tour was the eighth concert tour by the American rock band Linkin Park. It was launched in support of Linkin Park's fifth studio album Living Things (2012). The tour was officially announced in April 2012 through a teaser released after the release of trailer of the 11th Annual Honda Civic Tour by Linkin Park and Incubus. Later tour was officially announced during the Honda Civic Tour. Its first official leg under the name Living Things South American Tour began on September 14, 2012, in Mexico City and ended on October 12, 2012, in Porto Alegre. Two shows during the whole tour were cancelled. Both the shows were in Brazil. The following statement was issued on the official site: "Due to logistical issues, some changes have been made to Linkin Park's upcoming Brazilian tour.

== Background ==
The tour's first leg was in Latin America where the band played 6 shows. The tour began on September 14, 2012 in Mexico City and ended on October 12, 2012 in Porto Alegre. The second leg of the tour started after a month, and was titled as "Living Things South African Tour". The duration of the second leg was 4 days which included only 2 shows. Kongos were included as Special guest during this leg. It started on November 7, at Cape Town. This show marked the band's first show in Africa. A number of fans were injured before the show when scaffolding outside the venue fell on them due to the high winds. One fan died as a result and a number of others were hospitalized. Mike Shinoda addressed the accident at the following show on November 10, 2012, Johannesburg. The show in Johannesburg included 65,300 people in attendance.

The third leg of the tour started on February 21, 2013, with a LPU summit. Parts of the event were live streamed via the "LPU livestream.com" account. There was no DSP (Digital Souvenir Package) for the entire leg which was confirmed on February 25, 2013, as Las Vegas and the entire New Zealand/Australia Tour (8 shows) in February and March would not be getting DSPs. The fourth and the final leg was announced May 15, 2013. The tickets were made available on the same date by "SMTickets". The final leg was presented by "Scala events". The first show was played on August 10, 2013, at Chiba for the "Summer Sonic", where the band played with various bands like Metallica, Fall Out Boy, Bullet For My Valentine, Maximum The Hormone, One Ok Rock and Volbeat. After the show Mike and Chester joined "Steve Aoki" and played their single "A Light That Never Comes" for the first time.

== Development ==
Sales for general tickets began on October 2, 2012. "SMTickets" made tickets as pre-sale for the fourth leg. The set list mixed Living Things with the rest of the band's catalog. A half-minute-long trailer for the tour premiered in May 2013, featuring a Japanese narrator and assorted live scenes, paired with some of the bands' songs, including "Burn It Down", "What I've Done", "In The End" and "Castle of Glass" by Linkin Park. The promotional poster for the tour featured the Vinyl cover of the album. The volunteering during the tour was done by "Machine Shop"

== Set list ==
This set list is representative of the show in Buenos Aires at Estadio G.E.B.A.. It does not represent all dates throughout the tour.

1. "Tinfoil"
2. "Faint"
3. "Papercut"
4. "Given Up"
5. "With You"
6. "Somewhere I Belong"
7. "In My Remains"
8. "New Divide"
9. "Victimized" / "QWERTY"
10. "Points of Authority"
11. "Lies Greed Misery"
12. "Waiting for the End" (contains excerpts of "Until It Breaks")
13. "Breaking the Habit"
14. Medley: "Leave Out All the Rest" / "Shadow of the Day" / "Iridescent"
15. "The Catalyst"
16. "Lost in the Echo"
17. "Numb/Encore"
18. "What I've Done"
19. "One Step Closer"

Encore

20. "Burn It Down"
21. "In the End"
22. "Bleed It Out" (contains excerpts of "Sabotage", up until December 2012, by Beastie Boys)

== Tour dates ==
Date	City	Country	Venue
Europe
May 26, 2012	Lisbon	Portugal	Bela Vista Park
May 27, 2012	Landgraaf	Netherlands	Megaland
May 30, 2012	Skive	Denmark	Strandtangen
June 1, 2012	Nürburg	Germany	Nürburgring
June 3, 2012	Nuremberg	Germany	Zeppelinfeld
June 5, 2012	Berlin	Germany	Admiralspalast
June 6, 2012	Bucharest	Romania	Romexpo
June 8, 2012	Nickelsdorf	Austria	Pannonia Fields II
June 9, 2012	Warsaw	Poland	Pepsi Arena
June 10, 2012	Moscow	Russia	Tushino Airfield
June 12, 2012	Odesa	Ukraine	Chornomorets Stadium
June 14, 2012	Saint Petersburg	Russia	SKK Arena
Latin America
September 14, 2012	Mexico City	Mexico	Arena Ciudad de México
October 5, 2012	Buenos Aires	Argentina	Estadio G.E.B.A.
October 7, 2012	São Paulo	Brazil	Arena Anhembi
October 8, 2012	Rio de Janeiro	Brazil	Citibank Hall
October 10, 2012	Rio de Janeiro	Brazil	Citibank Hall
October 12, 2012	Porto Alegre	Brazil	Gigantinho
South Africa
November 7, 2012	Cape Town	South Africa	Cape Town Stadium
November 10, 2012	Johannesburg	South Africa	FNB Stadium
Australia and New Zealand
February 21, 2013	Auckland	New Zealand	Vector Arena
February 23, 2013	Bowen Hills	Australia	Brisbane Exhibition Ground
February 24, 2013	Sydney Olympic Park	Australia	ANZ Stadium
February 26, 2013	Darling Harbour	Australia	Sydney Entertainment Centre
February 27, 2013	Melbourne	Australia	Rod Laver Arena
March 1, 2013	Flemington	Australia	Flemington Racecourse
March 2, 2013	Adelaide	Australia	Bonython Park
March 4, 2013	Claremont	Australia	Claremont Showground
Asia
August 10, 2013	Chiba	Japan	Chiba Marine Stadium
August 11, 2013	Osaka	Japan	Maishima Summer Sonic Site Osaka
August 13, 2013	Pasay	Philippines	Mall of Asia Arena
August 15, 2013	Chek Lap Kok	Hong Kong	AsiaWorld-Arena
August 17, 2013	Taipei	Taiwan	Taipei Arena
August 19, 2013	Kuala Lumpur	Malaysia	Stadium Nasional Bukit Jalil
