= Recharged (album) =

Remix album by Linkin Park
- Released: October 29, 2013
- Recorded: 2011–2013
- Genres: Dubstep; EDM; drum and bass; hip hop
- Length: 68:43
- Labels: Warner Bros.; Machine Shop
- Producers: Rick Rubin; Mike Shinoda (original recordings)

Linkin Park chronology
Studio Collection 2000–2012 (2013)	Recharged (2013)	A Light That Never Comes (Remixes) (2014)

Singles from Recharged
- 1. "A Light That Never Comes" Released: October 11, 2013

Recharged (stylized in all caps) is the second remix album of recordings by American rock band Linkin Park. The album was released on October 29, 2013, through Warner Bros. Records and Machine Shop Recordings. It is entirely produced by Rick Rubin and Mike Shinoda. The album includes remixes of ten of the songs from the band's fifth studio album Living Things, as well as a new song, "A Light That Never Comes" (and a remix of it) with Steve Aoki, which is the album's first single, released on September 16. Recharged received mixed reviews from critics.

== Background and promotion ==
Recharged was officially announced on the band's Facebook page on September 12, 2013, the same day that their new game, LP Recharge, was released. The band revealed that the album is a remix album, featuring reinterpretations of ten of the songs from Living Things, as well as including their new song with Steve Aoki, "A Light That Never Comes" (and a remix of it). Five of the remixes were previously released as part of a pre-order promotion for Living Things, called Living Things Remixed (following the release of Living Things, pre-order customers received a remix of a song from the album each month for eight months). The band also announced that there will be a limited-edition version of the album, available exclusively from their website. It features an interactive 3D sculpture based on the Living Things album artwork, a 48-page art booklet, both Living Things and Recharged albums, and a magnetic stylus that can interact with the liquid solution in the 3D sculpture to create unique patterns and designs are included. Pre-orders began on September 16.

In regards to the song "A Light That Never Comes" and the album, Mike Shinoda said:

I think this song and release show where we're at right now. Making the song with Steve, premiering it through the Recharge Facebook game, and debuting it via Microsoft's Xbox Music—I think it's all indicative of our band's commitment to experimentation and pushing boundaries.

On September 13, Shinoda made another post on the band's Facebook page, revealing the track list and talking about the album:

After Reanimation, I told many people I would never put together another album of remixes ... but as I began to hear all the amazing reinterpretations of LIVING THINGS, I had to change my mind. The result, RECHARGED, is definitely worth it. I can't wait for you guys to hear this amazing project, with contributions by Pusha T, Datsik, KillSonik, Bun B, Money Mark, and others. Our new song with Steve Aoki, "A LIGHT THAT NEVER COMES", is on the album as well, plus a special remix of the new song by the inimitable Rick Rubin.

In that same post, Shinoda revealed that pre-orders from the band's website will receive an exclusive digital download of Paul van Dyk's remix of "Burn It Down", which was also previously released as part of Living Things Remixed.

As of October 24, 2013, the album can be heard in its entirety on MTV.com, five days before it was officially released.

On January 21, 2014, a new EP was released; it is entitled "A Light That Never Comes (Remixes)" online.

== Critical reception ==
Professional ratings
Aggregate scores
Source	Rating
Metacritic	49/100
Review scores
Source	Rating
AllMusic	3/5 stars
NME	5/10
Now	2/5 Ns
Kriss Method	4/5 stars

According to the review aggregator Metacritic, Recharged received "mixed or average reviews" based on a weighted average score of 49 out of 100 from 4 critic scores. NME called Recharged "further proof" that dubstep and EDM is nu metal's successor, and described the songs as "nosebleed drum'n'bass, 8-bit blips and oversized dancehall bass". They go on to add "Rick Rubin’s final Primal Scream-gone-hip-hop remix of "A Light That Never Comes" saves Recharged from disaster, but you might need resuscitating after this lot"

Stephen Thomas Erlewine of AllMusic gave it 3 out of 5 stars, declaring that "This is the kind of album that appeals primarily for hardcore fans looking for a new spin on the familiar; in other words, this is unlikely to convert EDM listeners to the pleasures of Linkin Park."

== Commercial performance ==
The album debuted at number ten on the Billboard 200 chart, with first-week sales of 33,000 copies in the United States. In its second week, the album sold 11,000 more copies. In its third week, the album sold 5,000 more copies bringing its total album sales to 49,000. By mid-2014, the album is said to have reached 111,000 sales in US. The album did more business in 2014 as compared to 2013. It became the eighth best selling Dance/Electronic Album and twenty-fifth best selling Hard Rock Album.

== Track listing ==
Recharged – Digital download / CD / Vinyl
No.	Title	Length
1.	"A Light That Never Comes" (Steve Aoki remix)	3:49
2.	"Castle of Glass" (M. Shinoda remix)	6:20
3.	"Lost in the Echo" (KillSonik remix)	5:09
4.	"Victimized" (M. Shinoda remix)	3:00
5.	"I'll Be Gone" (Vice remix; featuring Pusha T)	4:00
6.	"Lies Greed Misery" (Dirtyphonics remix)	4:50
7.	"Roads Untraveled" (Rad Omen Remix; featuring Bun B)	5:28
8.	"Powerless" (Enferno remix)	6:07
9.	"Burn It Down" (Tom Swoon remix)	4:46
10.	"Until It Breaks" (Datsik remix)	6:00
11.	"Skin to Bone" (Nick Catchdubs Remix) (featuring Cody B. Ware and Ryu)	3:54
12.	"I'll Be Gone" (Schoolboy remix)	6:11
13.	"Until It Breaks" (Money Mark Headphone remix)	4:29
14.	"A Light That Never Comes" (Rick Rubin remix)	4:40
Total length:		68:43

Recharged – Pre-order bonus track
No.	Title	Length
15.	"Burn It Down" (Paul van Dyk remix)	8:00
Total length:		76:43

Notes

- All tracks are stylized in all caps, just like their original versions.

== Personnel ==
Original Living Things credits adapted from Living Things liner notes.

=== Linkin Park ===
- Chester Bennington – vocals
- Rob Bourdon – drums
- Brad Delson – lead guitar, backing vocals; additional vocals on "Until It Breaks"; synthesizer on "Burn It Down"; sampler on "Lies Greed Misery", "Castle of Glass" and "Victimized"; acoustic guitar on "Castle of Glass"
- Dave "Phoenix" Farrell – bass, backing vocals; sampler on "Lost in the Echo", "Lies Greed Misery" and "Victimized"
- Joe Hahn – turntables, samples, programming, backing vocals
- Mike Shinoda – vocals, rhythm guitar, keyboard, piano, synthesizer; strings and horns on "Castle of Glass"

=== Additional musicians ===
- Steve Aoki – programmer, producer on "A Light That Never Comes"
- Owen Pallett – strings on "I'll Be Gone"
- KillSonik – interpretation on remix of "Lost in the Echo"
- Vice – interpretation on first remix of "I'll Be Gone"
- Pusha T – vocals on first remix of "I'll Be Gone"
- Dirtyphonics – interpretation on remix of "Lies Greed Misery"
- Rad Omen – interpretation on remix of "Roads Untraveled"
- Bun B – vocals on remix of "Roads Untraveled"
- Enferno – interpretation on remix of "Powerless"
- Tom Swoon – interpretation on remix of "Burn It Down"
- Datsik – interpretation on the first remix of "Until It Breaks"
- Nick Catchdubs – interpretation on the remix of "Skin to Bone"
- Cody B. Ware – vocals on remix of "Skin to Bone"
- Ryu – vocals on remix of "Skin to Bone"
- Schoolboy – interpretation on second remix of "I'll Be Gone"
- Money Mark – interpretation on second remix of "Until It Breaks"
- Rick Rubin – interpretation on remix of "A Light That Never Comes"

=== Additional personnel ===
- Rick Rubin – producer
- Mike Shinoda – producer, engineer, creative director
- Joe Hahn – creative director
- Ethan Mates – engineer
- Andrew Hayes – assistant, engineer, editor
- Brad Delson – additional production
- Jerry Johnson – drum technician
- Ryan DeMarti – production coordination, A&R coordination
- Manny Marroquin – mixing (assisted by Chris Galland and Del Bowers)
- Chris "Tek" O'Ryan – sound engineer
- Brian Gardner – mastering
- Rob Cavallo – A&R
- Liza Jospeph – A&R coordination
- Peter Standish – marketing director
- Mike Shinoda, Joe Hahn, Rickey Kim – creative direction
- Annie Nguyen – art direction
- Brandon Parvini of Ghost Town Media – additional artwork
- Frank Maddocks – LP icon design

== Charts ==
=== Weekly charts ===
Weekly chart performance for Recharged
Chart (2013–14)	Peak position
Australian Albums (ARIA)	7
Austrian Albums (Ö3 Austria)	9
Belgian Albums (Ultratop Flanders)	28
Belgian Albums (Ultratop Wallonia)	30
Canadian Albums (Billboard)	9
Czech Albums (ČNS IFPI)	29
Finnish Albums (Suomen virallinen lista)	38
German Albums (Offizielle Top 100)	4
Irish Albums (IRMA)	41
Dutch Albums (Album Top 100)	34
Hungarian Albums (MAHASZ)	6
Japanese Albums (Oricon)	13
New Zealand Albums (RMNZ)	9
Scottish Albums (Official Charts)	17
Spanish Albums (PROMUSICAE)	33
Swiss Albums (Schweizer Hitparade)	6
UK Albums (Official Charts)	12
UK Dance Albums (OCC)	1
US Billboard 200	10
US Top Dance/Electronic Albums (Billboard)	1
US Top Hard Rock Albums (Billboard)	1
US Top Rock Albums (Billboard)	3
US Top Alternative Albums (Billboard)	3

=== Year-end charts ===
Year-end chart performance for Recharged
Chart (2013)	Position
US Dance/Electronic Albums (Billboard)	18
US Hard Rock Albums (Billboard)	45

Chart (2014)	Position
US Dance/Electronic Albums (Billboard)	8
US Hard Rock Albums (Billboard)	25

== Certifications ==
Certifications for Recharged
Region	Certification	Certified units/sales
Germany (BVMI)	Gold	100,000^{‡}
^{‡} Sales+streaming figures based on certification alone.

== Release history ==
Region	Date	Format	Label
United States	October 29, 2013	CD; digital download	Warner Bros.; Machine Shop
