= 11th Annual Honda Civic Tour =

2012 concert tour

- Promotional tour by Honda Civic
- Promotional poster
- Location: North America
- Associated albums: Living Things; If Not Now, When?
- Start date: August 11, 2012
- End date: September 10, 2012
- Legs: 1
- No. of shows: 17
- Supporting act: Mutemath
- Website: civictour.honda.com

Honda Civic concert chronology
- 10th Annual Honda Civic Tour (2011); 11th Annual Honda Civic Tour (2012); 12th Annual Honda Civic Tour (2013)
Linkin Park tour chronology
A Thousand Suns World Tour (2010–2011)	11th Annual Honda Civic Tour (2012)	Living Things World Tour (2012–2013)
Incubus tour chronology
If Not Now, When? Tour (2011)	11th Annual Honda Civic Tour (2012)	2013 Latin American Tour (2013)

The 11th Annual Honda Civic Tour was a concert tour co-headlined by the American rock bands Linkin Park and Incubus. They were joined by Mutemath, a supporting act for the tour. The tour started on August 10, 2012, and ended on September 10, 2012.

This tour was the 11th tour in the Honda Civic Tour lineup, and was the shortest, going to 17 dates.

== Background ==
Announced on April 16, 2012, by Honda, the 2012 Honda Civic Tour featured Linkin Park, Incubus, and Mutemath. The tour started in Bristow, Virginia, and ended in Chula Vista, California.

As a tradition with all previous Honda Civic Tours, Linkin Park was chosen to design a Honda Civic Si and a CBR250R motorcycle. The band chose to base the cars artwork off their album they had just released, Living Things.

== Setlist ==
Linkin Park
1. "Tinfoil"
2. "Faint"
3. "Papercut"
4. "Given Up"
5. "With You"
6. "Somewhere I Belong"
7. "In My Remains"
8. "New Divide"
9. "Victimized" / "QWERTY"
10. "Points of Authority"
11. "Lies Greed Misery"
12. "Waiting for the End" (contains excerpts of "Until It Breaks")
13. "Breaking the Habit"
14. Medley: "Leave Out All the Rest" / "Shadow of the Day" / "Iridescent"
15. "The Catalyst"
16. "Lost in the Echo"
17. "Numb/Encore"
18. "What I've Done"
19. "One Step Closer"

Encore

20. "Burn It Down"
21. "In the End"
22. "Bleed It Out" (contains excerpts of "Sabotage" by Beastie Boys)
Incubus
1. "Adolescents"
2. "Circles"
3. "The Warmth"
4. "Megalomaniac"
5. "Nice to Know You"
6. "If Not Now, When?"
7. "Are You In?"
8. "Made For TV Movie"
9. "Hello"(Cover of Lionel Richie)
10. "Anna Molly"
11. "Quicksand"
12. "A Kiss to Send Us Off"
13. "In the Company of Wolves"
14. "Promises, Promises"
15. "Drive"
16. "Pardon Me"
17. "Sick Sad Little World"
18. "Tomorrow's Food"

== Tour dates ==
Date	City	Country	Venue	Box Office	Attendance
August 11, 2012	Bristow^{[A]}	United States	Jiffy Lube Live	$11,229,801	228,427
August 12, 2012	Uncasville^{[A]}	United States	Mohegan Sun Arena	$11,229,801	228,427
August 14, 2012	Mansfield	United States	Comcast Center	$11,229,801	228,427
August 15, 2012	Wantagh	United States	Nikon at Jones Beach Theater	$11,229,801	228,427
August 17, 2012	Camden	United States	Susquehanna Bank Center	$11,229,801	228,427
August 19, 2012	Alpharetta	United States	Verizon Wireless Amphitheatre	$11,229,801	228,427
August 21, 2012	Auburn Hills	United States	The Palace of Auburn Hills	$11,229,801	228,427
August 22, 2012	Cincinnati	United States	Riverbend Music Center	$11,229,801	228,427
August 24, 2012	Tinley Park	United States	First Midwest Bank Amphitheatre	$11,229,801	228,427
August 25, 2012	Noblesville	United States	Klipsch Music Center	$11,229,801	228,427
August 27, 2012	Dallas	United States	Gexa Energy Pavilion	$11,229,801	228,427
August 28, 2012	The Woodlands	United States	Cynthia Woods Mitchell Pavilion	$11,229,801	228,427
August 30, 2012	Greenwood Village	United States	Comfort Dental Amphitheatre	$11,229,801	228,427
September 5, 2012	Tacoma	United States	Tacoma Dome	$11,229,801	228,427
September 7, 2012	Mountain View	United States	Shoreline Amphitheatre	$11,229,801	228,427
September 8, 2012	Carson	United States	The Home Depot Center	$11,229,801	228,427
September 10, 2012	Chula Vista	United States	Cricket Wireless Amphitheatre	$11,229,801	228,427
Grand Total				$11,229,801 / $11,229,801	228,427 / 228,427 (94%)

^{A} Incubus did not play until 8/14/12.
