= Living Things =

Living Things may refer to:

- Life, all objects that have self-sustaining processes (biology)
- Organisms, contiguous living systems (such as animals, plants, fungi, or micro-organisms)
- Living Things (band), an American alternative rock band
- Living Things (Matthew Sweet album), 2004
- Living Things (Linkin Park album), 2012
  - Living Things +, a related DVD by Linkin Park
  - Living Things World Tour, a related world tour by Linkin Park

== See also ==
- Living Thing, an album by Peter Bjorn and John
- "Livin' Thing", a 1976 song written by Jeff Lynne, performed by Electric Light Orchestra (ELO)
