= Medal of Honor: Warfighter (soundtrack) =

Soundtrack album by Ramin Djawadi
- Released: September 25, 2012
- Recorded: 2011–2012
- Genre: Video game soundtrack
- Length: 65:34
- Label: E.A.R.S
- Producers: Ramin Djawadi; Mike Shinoda

Ramin Djawadi soundtrack chronology
Game of Thrones: Season 2 (2012)	Medal of Honor: Warfighter (2012)	Person of Interest (2012)

Mike Shinoda solo chronology
The Raid: Redemption (2012)	Medal of Honor: Warfighter (2012)	Post Traumatic EP (2018)

Singles from Medal of Honor: Warfighter
- 1. "Castle of Glass" Released: December 7, 2012

Medal of Honour: Warfighter is the soundtrack composed by Ramin Djawadi and featuring Linkin Park's co-vocalist Mike Shinoda to the 2012 first-person shooter video game of the same name.

The first official single from the soundtrack was "Castle of Glass", which was used for the promotion of the game.

== Background ==
The music for Warfighter was composed by Ramin Djawadi, who also composed the music for Medal of Honor (2010). The official soundtrack was released on September 25, 2012, on iTunes and Amazon, nearly one month before the release of the game. The soundtrack consists of 21 tracks, 2 of which were composed by Mike Shinoda, the co-vocalist and rapper of Linkin Park. Linkin Park's song "Castle of Glass" from their album Living Things serves as the theme song for Warfighter, and variations of the song appear on the soundtrack. Themes from the previous game reappear as well, albeit in slightly differed forms. The song was also released as a promotional single for the soundtrack just like the band's previous contribution of The Catalyst. The song was nominated for the "Best Song in a Game" award at the 2012 Spike Video Game Awards. The official video was released on October 10, 2012.

== Composition ==
The soundtrack uses "Castle of Glass" as the theme song which as Loudwire noted in their Living Things review that the song features "very different electronic elements and unique sounding samples that the band have added to their musical palette." Yet is one of the most direct that the band has done, with a traditional song structure and a melody reminiscent of country music.

== Track listing ==
All music is composed by Ramin Djawadi with additional writers listed below.

Medal of Honor: Warfighter (EA Games Soundtrack) (digital release)
No.	Title	Writer(s)	Length
1.	"For Rabbit"		2:50
2.	"Deploy"		2:39
3.	"NOC Out"	Mike Shinoda; Ramin Djawadi; Brandon Campbell	4:07
4.	"Lena's Theme"		3:26
5.	"Kit Up"		3:28
6.	"Restless Natives"		3:21
7.	"Blackbird on a Wire"		3:20
8.	"Bridge the Gap"		2:11
9.	"Saa'iq"	Ramin Djawadi; Mike Shinoda	4:33
10.	"The Raid"		2:17
11.	"Force Multiplier"		2:54
12.	"Old Friend, New Foe"		3:03
13.	"Victory at Sea"		3:06
14.	"Resolve"	Ramin Djawadi; Brandon Campbell	2:44
15.	"Green Light"		4:35
16.	"H.A.H.O."		2:45
17.	"Medal Run"		2:16
18.	"For Mother"		3:05
19.	"Buzz in the Air"		2:10
20.	"Lena's Dream"		2:26
21.	"With Honors"		4:26

Promotional single
No.	Title	Writer(s)	Length
22.	"Castle of Glass"	Linkin Park	3:25
