= I'll Be Gone =

I'll Be Gone may refer to:

- "I'll Be Gone" (Linkin Park song)
- "I'll Be Gone" (Spectrum song)
- "I'll Be Gone" (Avicii song)
- "I'll Be Gone", a song by Dwight Yoakam from Guitars, Cadillacs, Etc., Etc.
- "I'll Be Gone", a song by Tom Waits from Franks Wild Years
- "I'll Be Gone", a song by Clint Black from Killin' Time
- "I'll Be Gone", a song by Sasami from Blood on the Silver Screen
