= Castle of Glass =

Single by Linkin Park

from the album Living Things and Medal of Honor: Warfighter
- B-side: "Lost in the Echo" (KillSonik Remix)
- Released: November 10, 2012
- Recorded: 2011–12
- Studio: NRG Recording Studios (North Hollywood, California)
- Genre: Electronic rock; folk rock
- Length: 4:17 (video mix); 3:25 (album version)
- Label: Warner Bros.
- Composer: Linkin Park
- Lyricists: Chester Bennington; Mike Shinoda
- Producers: Mike Shinoda; Rick Rubin

Linkin Park singles chronology
"Powerless" (2012)	"Castle of Glass" (2012)	"A Light That Never Comes" (2013)

Music video
- "Castle of Glass" on YouTube

"Castle of Glass" is a song written by American rock band Linkin Park for their fifth studio album, Living Things. The song was produced by co-lead vocalist Mike Shinoda and Rick Rubin. The song was released as a promotional single for Danger Close Games's 2012 release, Medal of Honor: Warfighter, as with Linkin Park's previous contribution to the Medal of Honor series, "The Catalyst". The single was released on February 2, 2013, in physical format and on March 22, 2013, it was released as a digital single on iTunes.

A Mike Shinoda remix is featured on Linkin Park's second remix album, Recharged. The remix version is also featured in the video game Need for Speed Rivals as part of the soundtrack.

== Composition ==
"Castle of Glass"
A 21-second sample of the chorus and outro of "Castle of Glass".

"Castle of Glass" uses electronic elements from the band's previous studio album, A Thousand Suns. Loudwire noted in their Living Things review that the song features "very different electronic elements and unique sounding samples that the band have added to their musical palette." Yet is one of the most direct that the band has done, with a traditional song structure and a melody reminiscent of country music.

== Reception ==
"Castle of Glass" has received mixed reviews from critics. Billboard wrote in their review of Living Things, "A folk song with LP's muscle, "Castle of Glass" uses compelling songwriting, extended metaphors and a simple but radical (for Linkin Park) arrangement to offer one of the album's most intriguing tracks." A staff reviewer at Sputnikmusic wrote in their mixed review of Living Things that the song sounded too similar to "Powerless" and that the song "would have been better if it wasn't inferior to the similar sounding final track." AltSounds described "Castle of Glass" in their album review as "a drawn-out filler track that keeps to a crawling pace, is strangely passive and doesn't leave you feeling very inspired." The song was nominated for the "Best Song in a Game" award at the 2012 Spike Video Game Awards.

== Music video ==
The music video for "Castle of Glass" was recorded on August 1, 2012, and it contains footage from the first-person shooter video game Medal of Honor: Warfighter. It was released on October 10, 2012. The music video shows a young boy being told that his father has been killed in action. He and his mother mourn the death as his father's SEALs teammates and their families try to comfort them. The band is shown playing in a storm where shattered pieces of glass circle the band. The boy goes through his father's possessions, fast forwarding to him (played by Marine Corps veteran Scott Levy) becoming a SEAL, like his father before him. At the end of the video the man is seen telling a girl the heartbreaking news of her family member, as she too cries. The video hints at the boy and the woman being the family of Rabbit, who died in the previous game and the teammates being Mother and Preacher. True to the Medal of Honor philosophy, "Castle of Glass" highlights the emotional realities soldiers and their families face far from the battlefield. The video ends with a quote from Winston Churchill: "All great things are simple, and many can be expressed in single words: freedom, justice, honor, duty, mercy, hope." The music video for "Castle of Glass" is also dedicated to the movie The Messenger as Bennington's favorite movie.

The band's part of the music video was filmed entirely in front of a green screen, with the production being handled by Mothership and Digital Domain. Its post-production relied heavily on CGI animation and After-effects. Special effects have a prominent use in the music video, and also continues the motif of a world falling apart, as with the previous Living Things videos. One of these is an opening shot of Mike Shinoda, beginning with a shot from below, moving progressively upwards until the walls around him start to crumble. The music video also utilizes suspended animation techniques, which sees objects suspended in a fixed position in air, with a central subject being the one animate in this fixed point of time.

== Personnel ==
- Chester Bennington – co-lead vocals
- Mike Shinoda – lead vocals, electric guitar, strings, horns, piano
- Brad Delson – acoustic guitar, backing vocals, sampler
- Dave "Phoenix" Farrell – bass guitar, backing vocals
- Rob Bourdon – drums, percussion
- Joe Hahn – synthesizers, sampling, programming

== Track listing ==
CD single
No.	Title	Length
1.	"Castle of Glass"	3:25
2.	"Lost in the Echo" (KillSonik Remix)	5:09

DE iTunes EP
No.	Title	Length
1.	"Castle of Glass"	3:25
2.	"Lost in the Echo" (KillSonik Remix)	5:09
3.	"Burn It Down" (Live Rock Im Park 2012)	4:00
4.	"Lies Greed Misery" (Live Rock Im Park 2012)	2:30

== Charts ==
=== Weekly charts ===
Chart (2012–2014)	Peak position
Austria (Ö3 Austria Top 40)	2
Belgium (Ultratip Bubbling Under Wallonia)	18
Czech Republic Airplay (ČNS IFPI)	25
Czech Republic Singles Digital (ČNS IFPI)	48
France (SNEP)	166
Germany (GfK)	10
Hungary (Single Top 40)	7
Portugal (AFP)	34
Switzerland (Schweizer Hitparade)	17
UK Rock & Metal (Official Charts)	17
US Hot Rock & Alternative Songs (Billboard)	32
US Rock Airplay (Billboard)	24
US Alternative Airplay (Billboard)	16
Venezuela (Record Report)	148

Chart (2017)	Peak position
Italy (FIMI)	92

=== Year-end charts ===
Chart (2013)	Position
Austria (Ö3 Austria Top 40)	30
Germany (Media Control AG)	41
Italy (FIMI)	90
Switzerland (Schweizer Hitparade)	64
US Alternative Songs (Billboard)	50
US Hot Rock Songs (Billboard)	85

== Certifications ==
Region	Certification	Certified units/sales
Austria (IFPI Austria)	Gold	15,000^{*}
Denmark (IFPI Danmark)	Gold	45,000^{‡}
Germany (BVMI)	3× Gold	900,000^{‡}
Italy (FIMI)	Platinum	30,000^{*}
New Zealand (RMNZ)	Gold	15,000^{‡}
Switzerland (IFPI Switzerland)	Platinum	30,000^{‡}
United Kingdom (BPI)	Gold	400,000^{‡}
United States (RIAA)	Platinum	1,000,000^{‡}
^{*} Sales figures based on certification alone.^{‡} Sales+streaming figures based on certification alone.

== Release history ==
Region	Date	Format	Label
Worldwide	December 7, 2012	Digital Download	Warner Bros.
Germany	February 2, 2013	CD	Warner Bros.
