= I'll Be Gone (Linkin Park song) =

2012 song performed by Linkin Park

Song by Linkin Park

from the album Living Things
- Released: September 8, 2012
- Recorded: 2011–2012
- Genre: Electronic rock; alternative rock
- Length: 3:30
- Label: Warner Bros.
- Composer: Linkin Park
- Lyricists: Chester Bennington; Mike Shinoda
- Producers: Mike Shinoda; Rick Rubin

"I'll Be Gone" is a song by American rock band Linkin Park from their fifth studio album, Living Things. The song was written by the band and produced by co-lead vocalist Mike Shinoda and Rick Rubin. The song features strings by Arcade Fire arranger Owen Pallett. It entered the UK Rock Singles Charts at number 26 and was added to the playlist of Los Angeles modern rock station KROQ on December 5, 2012.

== Composition ==
"I'll Be Gone" has been said to leave the listener with dampened spirits due to the depressive feel of the track. AltSounds describes the song as a "guitar heavy number with solid drumming from Rob" and that is "building upon their (Linkin Park's) now quite signature futuristic sound". Billboard mentions that this track is a "compelling descent that recalls 90s modern rock heroes like Alice In Chains and Stone Temple Pilots."

On November 14, 2013, Linkin Park released an old demo of "I'll Be Gone", titled "Primo (I'll Be Gone - Longform 2010 Demo)", on their official Tumblr page as part of a promotion for their collection of songs for their fan club, the Linkin Park Underground. The demo was chosen to be featured as the third track on the LP Underground XIII album.

== Remixes ==
=== Vice Remix ===
"I'll Be Gone (Vice Remix)"

Promotional single by Linkin Park featuring Pusha T

from the album Recharged
- Released: October 24, 2013
- Recorded: 2012–2013
- Genre: Electronic rock; rap rock; EDM; hip hop; trap
- Length: 4:00
- Label: Warner Bros.; Machine Shop
- Songwriters: Linkin Park; Pusha T
- Producers: Mike Shinoda; Rick Rubin

Pusha T chronology
"Sweet Serenade" (2013)	"I'll Be Gone (Vice Remix)" (2013)	"Nosetalgia" (2014)

"I'll Be Gone (Vice Remix)" is a remix by American rock band Linkin Park. This song is the remix of "I'll Be Gone", from the band's fifth studio album Living Things, which was released in 2012. The original song was written by the band and produced by co-lead vocalist Mike Shinoda and Rick Rubin, remixed by DJ Vice. Vice also collaborated with Mike Shinoda for a demo-track named "Freestyle". Pusha T is the featuring artist on the promotional media. "I'll Be Gone (Vice Remix)" was made available for streaming on Tumblr on October 24, 2013. The song is featured as the fifth track on Linkin Park's second remix album Recharged.

=== Schoolboy remix ===
"I'll Be Gone (Schoolboy remix)" is another remix of the original song and is the twelfth track of Recharged. The track features a collaboration of singing and rapping. Bennington's vocals from the original track, minus the bridge, are still there, only with a verse from Pusha T and a brand new verse from Mike Shinoda (with his Fort Minor experience again) after the first bass drop. There is inclusion of rapped verses from Pusha T and Shinoda.

The song was uploaded on YouTube by the band on their official channel on the day of release with the streaming of it on Tumblr.

The Hype Machine gave the remix the peak position for the most popular music at Twitter: "Hot tracks on twitter in 3 days." This was tweeted by Shinoda on October 23, 2013.

== Reception ==
Loudwire says that the group shines on "I'll Be Gone" and says it shows "a duality in the lyrics that could be applied both to a personal relationship or our own imprint on the world we leave after we’ve left this mortal coil." and asks, "With lyrics like 'Let the sun fade out and another one rise, I’ll be gone,' are Linkin Park getting their darkest before the next day dawns?"

== Personnel ==
Linkin Park

- Chester Bennington – lead vocals
- Mike Shinoda – keyboards, rhythm guitar, backing vocals, piano
- Brad Delson – lead guitar
- Dave Farrell – bass guitar
- Joe Hahn – turntables, samplers
- Rob Bourdon – drums, percussion

Additional musicians

- Owen Pallett - strings

== Charts ==
Chart (2012)	Peak position
UK Rock & Metal (OCC)	26
