= Powerless (Linkin Park song) =

Single by Linkin Park

from the album Living Things and Abraham Lincoln: Vampire Hunter
- Released: October 31, 2012
- Recorded: 2011–2012 at NRG Recording Studios; (North Hollywood, California)
- Genre: Electronic rock; alternative rock
- Length: 3:44
- Label: Warner Bros.
- Composer: Linkin Park
- Lyricists: Chester Bennington; Mike Shinoda
- Producers: Mike Shinoda; Rick Rubin

Linkin Park singles chronology
"Lost in the Echo" (2012)	"Powerless" (2012)	"Castle of Glass" (2012)

Music video
- Abraham Lincoln: Vampire Hunter Promotional video on YouTube

"Powerless" (stylized in all-caps) is a song by American rock band Linkin Park. The song was written by the band and produced by co-lead vocalist Mike Shinoda and Rick Rubin. Its working title was "Tinfoil", which instead ended up serving as the intro to the song. It was released on iTunes as a digital single from the soundtrack of Abraham Lincoln: Vampire Hunter on October 31, 2012, in Japan. The song was also released as a single worldwide through the official website of the band. The song was released as the third single from the album Living Things. The release included the "Powerless" artwork and featured just the one track.

== Composition ==
"Powerless"
A 30 second sample of the chorus

"Powerless" is a mid-tempo song that features "lock-step beats, soaring harmonies, and synthesizer whispers". The song has a piano-based production and is described by Spin as having an "electro-goth atmosphere like Bruno Mars on the most recent Twilight soundtrack". The Silver Tongue Online described the song as "a foundation of busy percussion and electronica, a sweeping chorus and Coldplay-worthy bridge". It has also been described as a "surging, slow-burning, classically Linkin Park anthem". Lyrically, the song is about a self-destructive friend or lover.

== Promotion ==
"Powerless", the twelfth and closing track of the album, is featured in the closing credits to the film Abraham Lincoln: Vampire Hunter. A performance music video of "Powerless" featuring scenes from the film was released on Yahoo!, serving as the film's music trailer. The music video was directed by Timur Bekmambetov, director of Abraham Lincoln: Vampire Hunter. The video was filmed in Berlin, Germany. Bekmambetov screened the film for the band, who reacted positively to the film, and believed that the band had a song that would fit into the film; hence, "Powerless" was chosen.

It was used in a commercial promoting the second season of the NBC show Revolution, following the usage of "Roads Untraveled" in a commercial promoting the first season.

== Reception ==
Billboard lists "Powerless" as an example "of why Linkin Park remains vital while its nu-metal compatriots have more or less fallen by the wayside". AltSounds.com says the song is "certainly bigger and bolder than the majority of the album's songs, but it still doesn't shake you to your core like I wish it would".

== Music video ==
A music video for "Powerless" was announced in August 2012. Music for Relief premiered the promotion video of "Powerless" on November 27, 2012. The two-minute video was a compilation between the "Powerless" footage filmed for the trailer of Abraham Lincoln: Vampire Hunter and clips of the Music for Relief's Power the World campaign.

== Track listing ==
Digital single
No.	Title	Writer(s)	Length
1.	"Powerless"	Linkin Park	3:44

== Personnel ==
- Chester Bennington – lead vocals
- Mike Shinoda – keyboards, piano, backing vocals, guitars
- Dave Farrell – bass guitar
- Joe Hahn – turntables, samplers, synthesizers
- Rob Bourdon – drums, percussion

== Charts ==
Chart performance for "Powerless"
Chart (2012)	Peak position
UK Rock & Metal (OCC)	40

== Release history ==
Release dates and formats for "Powerless"
Region	Date	Format(s)	Label(s)	Ref.
Japan	October 31, 2012	Digital download	Warner Bros.	
Worldwide	October 31, 2012	Digital download	Warner Bros.	
