= In My Remains =

Song by Linkin Park

from the album Living Things
- Released: July 16, 2012
- Recorded: 2011–2012
- Genre: Alternative rock; electronic rock
- Length: 3:20
- Label: Warner Bros.; Machine Shop
- Composer: Linkin Park
- Lyricists: Chester Bennington; Mike Shinoda
- Producers: Mike Shinoda; Rick Rubin

"In My Remains" is a song by American rock band Linkin Park from their fifth studio album, Living Things. The song was written by the band and produced by co-lead vocalist Mike Shinoda and Rick Rubin. Although never released as a single in any part of the world, it charted in several countries.

== Composition ==
"In My Remains" features piano melodies and military percussion, as well as mid-tempo beats. The song has been compared to Chester Bennington's side-project Dead by Sunrise with its chanted bridge. The song has been described as a "military-like rat-a-tat". AltSounds describes the song as "a familiar laid-back striding rock vibe with catchy hooks and emotive piano chords over suitably thick chunks of percussion". Billboard mentions that the "production here lends to Linkin Park's overall potency, with the crisp verses sliding succinctly into the song's refrains".

== Reception ==
Loudwire praises Rob Bourdon's work for the song, calling him "an unsung hero on this disc, with a solid breakdown during 'In My Remains'". Country Times praises the song, saying "very skillfully put together and will sound great on the next Transformers soundtrack". Asian Age comments that the song "could easily make it to a superheroes movie soundtrack, with their heavy rhythm guitar sounds blending well with Bennington's punchy vocals and big choruses. It is also stated that it can be used as a space-voyage soundtrack".

== Personnel ==
- Chester Bennington – lead vocals
- Mike Shinoda – keyboards, co-lead vocals, rhythm guitar, piano
- Brad Delson – lead guitar, backing vocals
- Dave Farrell – bass, backing vocals
- Joe Hahn – turntables, sampling
- Rob Bourdon – drums, percussion

== Charts ==
Chart (2012)	Peak position
France (SNEP)	151
Germany (GfK)	83
UK Rock & Metal (OCC)	10
US Hot Rock Digital Songs (Billboard)	33
