= Burn It Down (Linkin Park song) =

2012 single by Linkin Park

Single by Linkin Park

from the album Living Things
- B-side: "New Divide" (Live); "In the End" (Live); "What I've Done" (Live)
- Released: April 16, 2012
- Recorded: February 2012
- Genre: Electronic rock; rap rock; hard rock; alternative rock; alternative pop; electropop
- Length: 3:51
- Label: Warner Bros.
- Composer: Linkin Park
- Lyricists: Chester Bennington; Mike Shinoda
- Producers: Mike Shinoda; Rick Rubin

Linkin Park singles chronology
"Iridescent" (2011)	"Burn It Down" (2012)	"Lost in the Echo" (2012)

Music videos
- "Burn It Down" on YouTube; "Burn It Down" (Lyric Video) on YouTube

"Burn It Down" (stylized in all caps) is a song by American rock band Linkin Park. The song was released to radio stations, as well as a digital download, on April 16, 2012, as the lead single and the third track from their fifth studio album, Living Things. The song was written by the band and produced by co-lead vocalist Mike Shinoda and Rick Rubin, who co-produced the band's studio albums Minutes to Midnight (2007) and A Thousand Suns (2010). A music video for the song was directed by Linkin Park turntablist Joe Hahn. As of June 24, 2022, "Burn It Down" has sold over three million copies in the United States alone.

== Background ==
"Burn It Down"
A 23 second sample of the chorus and outro of "Burn It Down" where lead singer Chester Bennington showcases his "anguished yowl" before he and rapper Mike Shinoda showcases, according to Rolling Stone, their "call-and-response" which is "all over electro grooves."

The song's working title was "Buried at Sea" and was recorded in February 2012, as revealed by numerous LPTVs (behind-the-scenes footage) released in April and May 2012. Lead singer Chester Bennington talked about the song in an interview with MTV, saying what made the song interesting was "the really high energy and the really strong electronic melodies and hooks kind of set this song apart, which is why we chose it as our first single." Mike Shinoda, the band's rapper and producer, noted that the song's meaning can be open to numerous interpretations, with an example being "what we do in pop culture, where we build somebody up to be the next great thing and then we just like to destroy them at the end of the day, and we've lived through that, so I think there's a lot of personal energy that went into the connection of that story." In an interview with The Huffington Post, Shinoda clarified that his explanation of "Burn It Down" was based on the band's personal experiences, saying:

...We're talking about my personal story and his personal story, and there's also a layer of pop culture that plays a role in the lyrics of the song. For example, people build up a certain celebrity or musician or actor or whatever and they're popular one minute and the next thing, you know either they've done something wrong or they've done nothing wrong and there's just a bad rumor that goes around about them and then everybody's attacking that person. That's just the way things are. We've actually lived through that as a band. All that stuff plays a role.

== Release and promotion ==
On March 28, 2012, Shinoda confirmed that the first single for Living Things would be "Burn It Down". On April 5, 2012, the band released a series of sliding puzzles at the band's official website to unlock snippets of the song. The last puzzle was completed on April 11, 2012, revealing the cover art. Another game was released, in which the snippets of the song were finally unveiled. A 30-second preview of the song was released by radio station SONiC 102.9. The song premiered on numerous modern rock radio stations. The band teamed up with the Lotus F1 team to create a musical racing iPad app entitled Linkin Park GP, where players drive a Lotus E20 and interact with an environment that allows the player to create a remix of "Burn It Down", as well as zooming into individual sections of the song. Linkin Park GP was released on May 24, 2012. On September 4, 2012, "Burn It Down", along with "Breaking the Habit", "Shadow of the Day", and "New Divide", were released in the "Linkin Park Pack 02" as downloadable content for the music rhythm video game, Rock Band 3.

== Live performances ==
The band performed the single for the very first time at Third Encore Rehearsal Studios in Burbank, California on May 16, 2012, to an audience who won passes from radio station KROQ. The band performed the single at numerous award shows, namely: the 2012 Billboard Music Awards at the MGM Grand Las Vegas, TV total Autoball at the Lanxess Arena in Cologne, Germany, the 2012 MTV Video Music Awards Japan at the Makuhari Messe, and the American Music Awards of 2012 at the Nokia Theatre in Los Angeles. "Burn It Down" was also included in the set list of the 11th Annual Honda Civic Tour (2012), where the band's performance of the song was accompanied by pyrotechnics.

== Critical reception ==
"Burn It Down" received generally positive reviews from numerous professional critics. Praise was directed towards Bennington's vocals, while criticism was pointed to the song's lyrics. Nick Catucci from Rolling Stone described Bennington's verses as his "prettiest ever" and concluded that the song "leaves open the option of just dancing the night away." He believed that the song is one of the band's best singles. According to Chris Martins of Spin, "Burn It Down" is "seared but still high-sheen slab of cross-pollinated pop driven by four-on-the-floor pump and the pulse of guitars and synths irreparably fused together." Rick Florino of Artistdirect hailed "Burn It Down" as "one of the most incendiary tracks of 2012," awarding the song with a perfect five stars. Anne Erickson of Loudwire praised Bennington and Shinoda's vocals, commenting that the song is "packed with subdued rhythms, riffs and raps, draped in a sea of atmospheric electronics." AOL Radio listed "Burn It Down" as the best rock song and the second best alternative song of 2012, defining "Burn It Down" as "the perfect example of how Linkin Park has been able to stay relevant and become one of the most popular rock bands of today."

Andrew Unterberger of Popdust felt mixed towards the song, commended Bennington's vocals, while criticizing Shinoda's raps and the song's lyrics. Tim Grierson of About.com noted that the song "enrapture[s] the ear...but the words aren’t nearly as captivating, dealing in a familiar love-as-Armageddon conceit." Genevieve Koski and Steven Hyden of The A.V. Club were both negative towards "Burn It Down", in which Koski said that the song "amplifies its mediocrity with its preening self-importance" and "seems to be competing for some sort of award for Vaguest Lyrics." Jeff Sorensen, writing for The Huffington Post, thought that the song's lyrical content was "like they were flipping through a dictionary and put crappy drop D guitar riffs to it."

In 2013, Consequence named the track as the 22nd-worst rock song to reach number one on the Billboard charts.

== Music video ==
The music video was directed by Joe Hahn, the band's turntablist. Filming for the video commenced on March 28, 2012. Warner Bros. Records announced that a lyric video would also premiere on April 15. It was released through YouTube. Bennington described the music video's set as an "electronic pod, full of wires and cables," as well as stating that the video features numerous visual effects. Bennington also noted the video's similarity to their live performances, saying "we're really trying to capture a live kind of element with the band just playing just very similar to how we would perform live." Bennington noted that Hahn pushed the group in making the video – "And, for whatever reason, I usually get it the worst. I've almost drowned, I had all this powder thrown in my face. ... On this new one, I was sweating like crazy. It was intense." "Burn It Down" was used in the promotional teaser for the 2012 NBA Playoffs on TNT, featuring previews of the music video. The music video premiered on May 24, 2012, on MTV. The music video was nominated for the 2012 MTV Video Music Awards in two categories for the Best Rock Video and Best Visual Effects. The video peaked at Vh1 India's top 50 videos of 2012 at #5. "Burn It Down"'s video was also ranked 11th of the Top 40 Music Videos Of 2012 by Fuse.

=== Reception ===
The music video of "Burn It Down" received critical acclaim. Perri Tomkiewicz of Billboard praised the music video of "Burn It Down" as "simple yet striking...[it] displays the group's new electro influences without relinquishing their long-standing and rebellious rock roots." Mark Graham of VH1 compared the video to the band's previous music video for "Waiting for the End", as well as "the undeniable combination of the organic and the mechanical present in the setting in which the band performs" of the film Alien. James Montgomery of MTV noticed the band was "pushed to the absolute limit ... to the point where, when the band bursts into flames at the end, you can't help wondering if they didn't just spontaneously combust." Marc Hogan of Spin noted that the video "soundtracks an emotion-wracked live performance accompanied by — you guessed it — fiery visual effects." Chad Childers of Loudwire described the video as "a not-so-standard performance piece with the band members in a sweltering room seemingly filled with light and energy that only intensifies as the video progresses." David Greenwald of MTV echoed similar comments, calling it a "darker, industrial offering, with trippy sci-fi special effects and a Matrix-y all-black wardrobe palette."

=== Contest ===
Linkin Park, Warner Bros. Records and Genero held a contest in which fans can create their own music video of "Burn It Down". The winner chosen by the band and Warner Bros. will receive $5,000 and the winning video will premiere on MTV worldwide. On August 7, the overall winner, Jem Garrard, was chosen by Genero, the band, and Warner Bros.; the other finalists were: Pauline Goasmat, Tomato22, iVideoMaking, Supers4upen, RiKYaN, TKJAC, A Strike to Burn Productions, JPKaukonen, Little Earth, Alexander_Oph, and Dackant.

== Commercial performance ==
"Burn It Down" debuted at number 30 on the US Billboard Hot 100, selling 115,000 downloads in its first week. The song slid down to number 62 the following week on the US Billboard Hot 100. It was their last Top 40 hit until 2023's "Lost". The song debuted at number 11 on the US Billboard Hot Digital Songs chart in its first week and number 2 on the Rock Songs chart. The song peaked at number 1 on the US "Alternative Songs" chart as well as the US rock songs and US mainstream rock songs chart becoming their second song after "New Divide" to do so. This was their 11th #1 hit on the Alternative chart as well as their 6th #1 on the Mainstream Rock charts. The song reached its million sales mark in the US in December 2012, and as of June 2014, it has sold 1,297,000 copies in the US.

In Poland, "Burn It Down" peaked also at number 1 and in Germany, it peaked at number 2, becoming their most successful song in these countries. It is also their first single to chart in France since "Shadow of the Day" peaked at number 20.

== Track listing ==
All tracks are written by Linkin Park.

iTunes single
No.	Title	Length
1.	"Burn It Down"	3:51

European single • Burn It Down EP • DE iTunes EP
No.	Title	Length
1.	"Burn It Down"	3:51
2.	"New Divide" (Live)	4:29
3.	"In the End" (Live)	3:39
4.	"What I've Done" (Live)	4:04

Japanese single
No.	Title	Length
1.	"Burn It Down"	3:51
2.	"New Divide" (Live)	4:29
3.	"In the End" (Live)	3:39

Burn It Down Remixes DJ Promo CD
No.	Title	Length
1.	"Burn It Down" (Main)	3:50
2.	"Burn It Down" (Instrumental)	4:11
3.	"Burn It Down" (Acapella)	2:56
4.	"Burn It Down" (Paul van Dyk Remix)	8:00
5.	"Burn It Down" (Paul van Dyk Radio Edit (No Rap))	4:01
6.	"Burn It Down" (Paul van Dyk Remix (No Rap))	7:30
7.	"Burn It Down" (RAC Remix)	3:38
8.	"Burn It Down" (Hann With Gun Remix)	4:09
9.	"Burn It Down" (Double Dust Remix)	4:58
10.	"Burn It Down" (Heavy Burn Remix)	6:25
11.	"Burn It Down" (Arya Shani Remix)	6:00
12.	"Burn It Down" (John Reaper Remix)	3:12

== Personnel ==
Linkin Park

- Chester Bennington – lead vocals
- Mike Shinoda – rap vocals, keyboards
- Brad Delson – guitar, synthesizer
- Dave "Phoenix" Farrell – bass guitar, backing vocals
- Joe Hahn – synthesizers, samples
- Rob Bourdon – drums

== Charts ==
=== Weekly charts ===
2012–2013 weekly chart performance for "Burn It Down"
Chart (2012–2013)	Peak position
Australia (ARIA)	41
Austria (Ö3 Austria Top 40)	10
Belgium (Ultratip Bubbling Under Flanders)	6
Belgium (Ultratop 50 Wallonia)	20
Brazil Hot 100 (Billboard)	71
Brazil Hot Pop Songs (Billboard)	27
Canada Hot 100 (Billboard)	33
Canada Rock (Billboard)	8
Czech Republic Airplay (ČNS IFPI)	29
Denmark (Tracklisten)	37
France (SNEP)	47
Germany (GfK)	2
Hungary (Editors' Choice Top 40)	29
Ireland (IRMA)	43
Italy (FIMI)	11
Japan Hot 100 (Billboard)	7
Japan (Oricon)	108
Lebanon (The Official Lebanese Top 20)	1
Luxembourg Digital Songs (Billboard)	1
Mexico Airplay (Billboard)	50
Mexico Ingles Airplay (Billboard)	6
Netherlands (Dutch Top 40 Tipparade)	12
Netherlands (Single Top 100)	59
New Zealand (Recorded Music NZ)	13
Poland Airplay (ZPAV)	1
Russia Airplay (TopHit)	7
Russia (2M)	10
Scottish Singles Sales (Official Charts)	28
Slovakia Airplay (ČNS IFPI)	29
Spain (Promusicae)	43
Switzerland (Schweizer Hitparade)	12
UK Singles (Official Charts)	27
UK Rock & Metal (Official Charts)	1
Ukraine Airplay (TopHit)	94
US Billboard Hot 100	30
US Adult Pop Airplay (Billboard)	17
US Hot Rock & Alternative Songs (Billboard)	1
US Pop Airplay (Billboard)	24

2017 weekly chart performance for "Burn It Down"
Chart (2017)	Peak position
Czech Republic Singles Digital (ČNS IFPI)	61
Portugal (AFP)	91

=== Year-end charts ===
2012 year-end chart performance for "Burn It Down"
Chart (2012)	Position
Austria (Ö3 Austria Top 40)	49
France (SNEP)	148
Germany (Official German Charts)	20
Italy (FIMI)	56
Russia Airplay (TopHit)	28
Switzerland (Schweizer Hitparade)	59
Ukraine Airplay (TopHit)	186
US Billboard Hot 100	100
US Hot Rock Songs (Billboard)	3

2013 year-end chart performance for "Burn It Down"
Chart (2013)	Position
Russia Airplay (TopHit)	195

== Certifications ==
Certifications and sales for "Burn It Down"
Region	Certification	Certified units/sales
Austria (IFPI Austria)	Gold	15,000^{*}
Denmark (IFPI Danmark)	Gold	15,000^{^}
Germany (BVMI)	3× Gold	900,000^{‡}
Italy (FIMI)	Platinum	30,000^{*}
New Zealand (RMNZ)	Platinum	30,000^{‡}
Switzerland (IFPI Switzerland)	Platinum	30,000^{^}
United Kingdom (BPI)	Gold	400,000^{‡}
United States (RIAA)	3× Platinum	3,000,000^{‡}
Streaming
Denmark (IFPI Danmark)	Gold	900,000^{†}
^{*} Sales figures based on certification alone.^{^} Shipments figures based on certification alone.^{‡} Sales+streaming figures based on certification alone.^{†} Streaming-only figures based on certification alone.

== Release history ==
Release dates and formats for "Burn It Down"
Region	Date	Format	Label(s)	Ref.
United States	May 22, 2012	Mainstream airplay	Warner Bros.	
