= Living Things (Linkin Park album) =

2012 studio album by Linkin Park

Studio album by Linkin Park
- Released: June 20, 2012
- Recorded: March 2011 – April 2012
- Studios: NRG Recording (North Hollywood, California)
- Genres: Electronic rock; alternative rock; rap rock
- Length: 36:59
- Labels: Warner Bros.; Machine Shop
- Producers: Rick Rubin; Mike Shinoda

Linkin Park chronology
Minutes to Midnight – Live Around the World (2012)	Living Things (2012)	Studio Collection 2000–2012 (2013)

Vinyl and Australian Tour Edition

Singles from Living Things
- 1. "Burn It Down" Released: April 16, 2012; 2. "Lost in the Echo" Released: October 5, 2012; 3. "Powerless" Released: October 31, 2012; 4. "Castle of Glass" Released: November 10, 2012

Living Things (stylized in all caps) is the fifth studio album by American rock band Linkin Park. It was released under Warner Bros. Records and Machine Shop Records on June 20, 2012, in Japan, and throughout the rest of the world during the following week. Production was handled by vocalist Mike Shinoda and Rick Rubin, who both co-produced the band's previous two studio albums, Minutes to Midnight (2007) and A Thousand Suns (2010). Living Things was their last album to be produced by Rubin and recorded at NRG Recording Studios.

The band states that Living Things combines elements from their previous four studio albums to create a new sound. They stated they finally felt they were in "familiar territory" and "comfortable in [their] own skin" after years of experimentation that resulted in their two previous studio albums, Minutes to Midnight and A Thousand Suns. Living Things was chosen as the album's title because of the numerous personal topics on the album.

The lead single for the album, "Burn It Down", was sent to radio and released to digital music retailers on April 16, 2012. Living Things debuted at number one on Billboard 200 with sales of 223,000 copies in the United States in its opening week. The second single for the album, "Lost in the Echo", was released on October 5, 2012. The third single "Powerless" was released on October 31, 2012. The fourth and final single for the album, "Castle of Glass", was released in its physical format on February 1, 2013. The album was certified Platinum by the RIAA in August 2017.

== Background and recording ==
The recording of Living Things started in March 2011 and ended in April 2012. In June 2011, lead singer Chester Bennington revealed to Kerrang! that Linkin Park had begun working on new material for their fifth album. He explained, "We've been working on a new record for the past two months. The music is great and we're well ahead of where we're expecting to be. There aren't a whole lot of noises going on, but there are a lot of good songs."

The band's co-lead vocalist and rapper, Mike Shinoda, and Rick Rubin served as producers for the album. "Typically we'll have a once-a-week meeting to go listen to the songs that they're coming up with and talk about them. For so early in the project, they are much further along than they have been on the last two albums we did. On A Thousand Suns there were still a lot of irons in the fire. We knew, 'OK, we can't do this forever. Let's leave this batch and we'll come back and address it when we start up again'", Rubin said. Bennington explained that Rubin "gives us spaces to just be ourselves and to work on our own...He gives us a clear and concise description of what he likes...He would like us to push ourselves into a more fresh take on that particular sound." He also stated that Shinoda guides the band through the process of each song, and called the team-up of Shinoda and Rubin "our golden ticket."

In July 2011, Bennington told Rolling Stone that Linkin Park aims to produce a new album every eighteen months, and that he would be shocked if a new album did not come out in 2012. The band continues to record and produce new material even while touring. Bennington commented on Linkin Park's schedule, stating, "Touring for two years is excruciating. When we would tour for two years even the most resilient person in the band, at the end of that, was fucking miserable." He further elaborated on their ideas in an interview with MTV saying, "We do have a really great head start. We've got some great music, some good ideas. The creativity has continued to flow for us for the last few years, consistently." He later revealed in another interview in September 2011 that the band was still in the beginning phases of the next album, saying "We just kind of began. We like to keep the creative juices flowing, so we try to keep that going all the time...we like the direction that we're going in." Shinoda told Complex magazine that they spent a year in making the album, as well as elaborating on the album's sound, saying that "It doesn't lose any of the creativity of the newer stuff and it brings in the energy of the older stuff. It's kind of a comprehensive sound. I feel like we've been able to take all the stuff we've learned on the way and put it all together in each song and still keep it fresh and forward-thinking." Shinoda told HitFix that the process of the album "felt like a drug trip...we were looking to redefine everything."

Shinoda spoke to Co.Create about the album's art, saying that it will "blow [the fans] away...the average person is not going to be able to look at it and go, I understand that that's completely new, like not just the image but the way they made the image is totally new. So there's going to be that." The band underwent 360-degree body scans for numerous lyric videos and artwork for the album. The album's art was released on April 16, 2012, along with the album's first single, "Burn It Down".

== Composition ==
In an interview featured in the March 21, 2012 issue of Kerrang! magazine, Bennington stated that the band has returned to more "familiar" territory on their new record, saying "with this [new] album, we've incorporated a lot of guitar work with big choruses and the heavier electronic stuff to give it that really big wall of sound feeling without getting too metal. This will be more familiar to people than A Thousand Suns was, where we were like 'Fuck it, we're just going to go bonkers." Bennington also said that the new album's lyrics would be personal and avoid being political, adding "We've been writing a lot about relationships." Bennington and Shinoda echoed similar statements during an interview with Spin, with the former commenting that "We now know we have the skills and the tools to take those ideas and make them into what we're actually looking for, as opposed to getting into it and discovering that it just sounds really nü-metal. That's always going to be gross to us, but we can take elements of that and reinvent the vibe, make it new and fresh." The two previewed five songs from the album, as well as announced that they had collaborated with Canadian musician Owen Pallett. The vocalists also stated that they have adopted numerous influences and topics for the album, particularly about people.

Bennington told Live 105 that the band is "embracing everything that [they] have done in the past," taking the "best pieces" of their previous four albums and "smash[ing] them together into this new record." Shinoda explained in an interview with NME that the album would not return to their nu metal sound, however he assured that the record "gets back to our roots and it's captured a feeling that we haven't gone after in many years." He also spoke similar statements to Bennington about combining elements of all four albums, saying, "We've learned so much from all the albums we've done, so we've taken everything we've learned and mixed it all into one." Shinoda stated that the album is more "rap-centric" compared to their previous two albums. Shinoda told Musique Mag that the band wanted the album to be "more energetic [and] song-based", as opposed to their previous album, A Thousand Suns, which was more of a concept record.

The band had numerous influences and inspirations for Living Things. Shinoda told Rolling Stone that "Castle of Glass", "Skin to Bone" and "Roads Untraveled" contained folk music influenced by the works of Bob Dylan, as well as the inspirations of Dylan. In the seventh track "Victimized", which Rolling Stone described as "the band's most aggressive track in years", was influenced by punk rock bands such as Pennywise and Dirty Rotten Imbeciles. Shinoda noted the minimal content of numerous punk rock songs attributed to the short length of "Victimized"; bassist Dave "Phoenix" Farrell noted that the song's working title, "Battle Axe", "which to me is..what that song is; it's just this big 'crack' and then you're out." Like the band's first two albums, the penultimate track ("Tinfoil") is an instrumental. Brad Delson, the band's guitarist, has vocals in the tenth track "Until It Breaks", which was his idea. The album explores the genres alternative rock, electronic rock and rap rock.

== Release and promotion ==
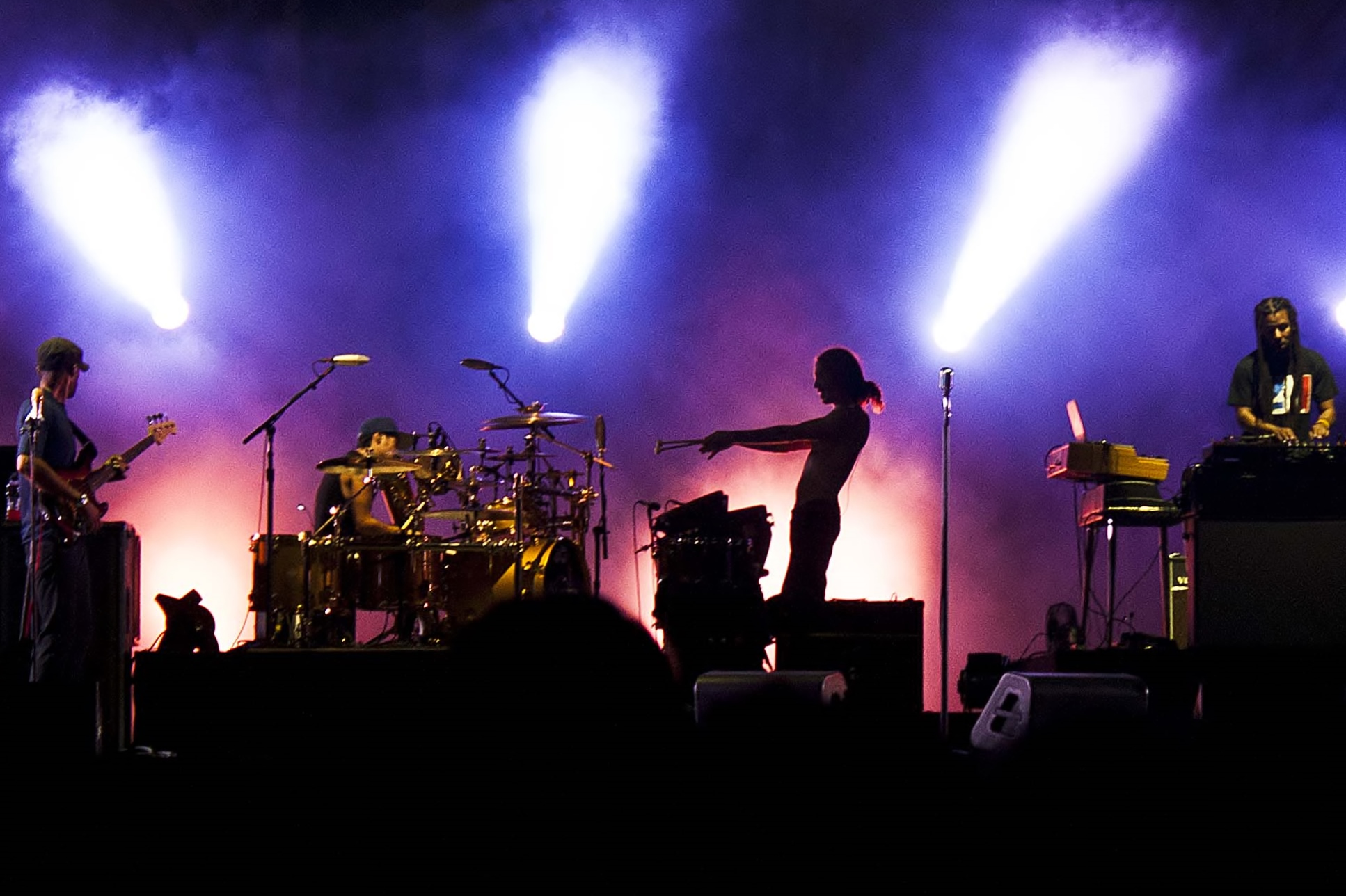
Linkin Park embarked with American rock band Incubus (pictured) and Mutemath on the 2012 Honda Civic Tour.

The band toured with Incubus and Mutemath on the 2012 Honda Civic Tour. The band's concert at the Admiralspalast Theatre in Berlin, Germany was recorded and was shown in theaters on June 25, 2012, for one night only. The band performed a private concert at the 2012 X Games in Los Angeles. On July 23, 2012, Linkin Park announced they would be touring South Africa for the first time, performing in Johannesburg and Cape Town in November 2012.

On March 28, 2012, Shinoda confirmed that the album's first single is "Burn It Down". On April 11, 2012, it was confirmed that it would be sent for radio airplay and released to iTunes digital download on April 16, 2012. Shinoda also confirmed they were filming a music video for the song, with the band's turntablist Joe Hahn directing the video. The band teamed up with the Lotus F1 team to create a musical racing iPad app titled Linkin Park GP, where players drive a Lotus E20 and interact with an environment that allows the player to create a remix of "Burn It Down", as well as zooming into individual sections of the song. The music video for "Burn It Down" premiered on MTV on May 24, 2012.

On April 15, 2012, Mike Shinoda posted a blog update confirming that the new album title is Living Things and that the album would be available for pre-order through their website, starting April 16. Living Things was released on June 26, 2012. Pre-orders for the album began on April 17, 2012; upon purchase, fans were subscribed to Living Things Remixed, remixed songs from the album. In celebration of the release of Living Things, the band teamed up with music streaming website Spotify to release live compilations of each album era.

On May 9, 2012, a worldwide interactive scavenger hunt commenced. Shinoda proclaimed the near-end of the scavenger hunt on May 23, 2012, stating he would call BBC Radio 1 DJ Zane Lowe the next day to premiere a new song from Living Things, the result of the hunt. The song that premiered on BBC Radio 1 on May 24, 2012, was the album's fourth track, "Lies Greed Misery".

On June 4, 2012, the official lyric video of "Lies Greed Misery" premiered. On the same day, "Lies Greed Misery" was featured in a trailer for the video game Medal of Honor: Warfighter, that was revealed by Electronic Arts at E3 2012. "Castle of Glass" was also confirmed to be featured in Medal of Honor: Warfighter. "Powerless", the twelfth and closing track of the album, is featured in the closing credits to the film Abraham Lincoln: Vampire Hunter. A performance music video of "Powerless" featuring scenes from the film was released on Yahoo!. The music video was directed by Timur Bekmambetov, director of Abraham Lincoln: Vampire Hunter. The official lyric video for "Lost in the Echo" was released via Linkin Park's official YouTube page on June 29, 2012. and the official music video was released on September 4, 2012. On October 5, 2012, "Lost in the Echo" was released as the album's second single. On October 10, 2012, Linkin Park released the music video for "Castle of Glass". On October 31, 2012, "Powerless" was released as an iTunes-only single in Japan, although there has been neither an official statement about "Powerless" being a single nor any promotion around the release date. "I'll Be Gone" was released to alternative radio as a promotional single on December 5, 2012, while "Castle of Glass" was released as the album's third single on February 1, 2013 and impacted US radio on January 5, 2013.

== Reception ==
=== Commercial ===
Living Things debuted at number one on the Billboard 200, selling 223,000 copies, beating out Maroon 5's Overexposed by 1,000 sales, according to Nielsen SoundScan, and fell to number 5 on its second week on chart selling 64,000 copies. The album has reached the top spot in seventeen countries becoming their best charting album so far and has been certified Gold in Australia for shipments of at least 35,000 copies, and also attained Gold certification in Switzerland. It also debuted at number one in UK Albums Chart, selling 41,000 copies beating out Maroon 5's album once again. In Canada, the album also debuted at number one selling at least 20,000 copies. As of 2014, the album has sold 681,000 copies in the United States.

=== Critical reception ===
Professional ratings
Aggregate scores
Source	Rating
Metacritic	60/100
Review scores
Source	Rating
About.com	2.5/5 stars
AllMusic	3.5/5 stars
The A.V. Club	C
Entertainment Weekly	B
The Guardian	3/5 stars
Loudwire	4/5 stars
NME	5/10
The Observer	3/5 stars
PopMatters	6/10
Rolling Stone	3/5 stars

According to the review aggregator Metacritic, Living Things received "mixed or average reviews" based on a weighted average score of 60 out of 100 from 15 critic scores.

Chad Childers of Loudwire stated that "the album as a whole continues to expand their world-view writing like what listeners got with A Thousand Suns, but it also adds more of the anger that was prevalent in their earliest work, Hybrid Theory." Stephen Thomas Erlewine from AllMusic declared that "there is definition to their structure, some of the choruses catch hold without too much effort – but this album remains one of sustained mood, not individual moments" and concludes that the album is "a fitting soundtrack for aging rap-rockers who are comfortable in their skin but restless at heart". The Guardian writer Dave Simpson observed that "Living Things is more personal than A Thousand Suns, with underlying themes of recovery from traumatic experiences. The exception, Burn It Down, delivers an antiwar sentiment via Depeche Mode-y electro-bounce, while the similarly standout Roads Untraveled is an eerie confessional ballad", and concluded that "Living Things would have benefited from more of such adventure, but they still sound like a band enjoying an unexpected second life". Johan Wippsson of Melodic wrote that the album is "too little too pop-oriented and made for the charts than before. The synthesizers are a bit too intent to Coldplay mode, but assume that the band felt it was time to conquer the charts again." PopMatters' Jordan Blum concluded that "Living Things is a very good entry that’s simply not as special as its precursor." Phil Mongredien from The Observer comments on their refusal to play it safe and praises their boldness.

Tim Grierson at About.com stated that Living Things is "a straightforward collection that plays to their rap-rock strengths, and while it’s often musically engaging, these 12 songs don’t have enough cumulative impact. As a result, the record ends up being a diverting experience rather than an arresting one." At The A.V. Club, Evan Rytlewski commented that the band "can dial down (or turn back up) the heaviness all it wants, recruit the most Grammy-proven producers, and keep current with the latest electronic textures, but those moves can only take Linkin Park so far when its songs have all the emotional range of an MMA bout". Another mixed review from Hamish MacBain at NME stated that "...their foray into said genre here is restricted to the three minutes of ‘Castle of Glass’. The rest is... well, to be fair, they've obviously been listening to a bit of Skrillex, and thus the heavy guitar thud of yore has been replaced by a new, heavy electronic thud, but that aside it's largely the usual semi-hilarious histrionica to which we’ve become accustomed." MacBain also added that, in the sub-description of the review, the album is "A predictable earache".

== Track listing ==
All lyrics are written by Chester Bennington and Mike Shinoda; all music is composed by Linkin Park.

No.	Title	Length
1.	"Lost in the Echo"	3:25
2.	"In My Remains"	3:20
3.	"Burn It Down"	3:51
4.	"Lies Greed Misery"	2:27
5.	"I'll Be Gone"	3:31
6.	"Castle of Glass"	3:25
7.	"Victimized"	1:46
8.	"Roads Untraveled"	3:49
9.	"Skin to Bone"	2:48
10.	"Until It Breaks"	3:43
11.	"Tinfoil" (instrumental)	1:11
12.	"Powerless"	3:43
Total length:		36:59

Japanese edition bonus track
No.	Title	Length
13.	"What I've Done" (live)	4:07
Total length:		41:12

Australian tour edition bonus disc
No.	Title	Length
1.	"In the End" (live)	3:41
2.	"New Divide" (live)	4:30
3.	"What I've Done" (live)	4:06
4.	"Lost in the Echo" (KillSonik Remix)	5:11
5.	"Burn It Down" (live Rock im Park 2012)	4:02
6.	"Lies Greed Misery" (live Rock im Park 2012)	2:31

Living Things + bonus DVD (Live at Admiralspalast, Berlin, Germany)
No.	Title	Length
1.	"Tinfoil"	1:49
2.	"Faint"	3:50
3.	"Papercut"	3:17
4.	"With You"	3:37
5.	"Given Up"	3:49
6.	"Blackout"	4:45
7.	"Somewhere I Belong"	4:48
8.	"New Divide"	5:02
9.	"Lies Greed Misery"	2:31
10.	"Waiting for the End"	5:27
11.	"Breaking the Habit"	3:19
12.	"Leave Out All the Rest/Shadow of the Day/Iridescent"	5:46
13.	"What I've Done"	3:29
14.	"One Step Closer"	4:26
15.	"Burn It Down"	3:55
16.	"In the End"	3:41
17.	"Numb"	3:07
18.	"Bleed It Out/Sabotage (Beastie Boys Cover)"	5:21

Living Things Remixed
No.	Title	Length
1.	"Burn It Down" (RAC Remix)	3:38
2.	"Burn It Down" (Paul van Dyk Remix)	8:00
3.	"Burn It Down" (Swoon Remix)	4:51
4.	"Until It Breaks" (Datsik Remix)	6:04
5.	"Roads Untraveled" (Rad Omen Remix feat. Bun B)	5:32
6.	"Burn It Down" (Bobina Remix)	5:22
7.	"Until It Breaks" (Money Mark Remix)	4:36
8.	"Powerless" (Enferno Remix)	6:20

Notes

- All tracks in the standard track listing are stylized in all caps.

== Personnel ==
Linkin Park

- Chester Bennington – vocals
- Rob Bourdon – drums, percussion, backing vocals
- Brad Delson – lead guitar, backing vocals; additional vocals (10); synthesizer (3); sampler (4, 6, 7); acoustic guitar (6), additional production
- Dave "Phoenix" Farrell – bass guitar, backing vocals; sampler (1, 4, 7)
- Joe Hahn – turntables, synthesizer, samples, programming, backing vocals, creative direction
- Mike Shinoda – vocals, rhythm guitar, keyboard, piano, synthesizer; lead guitar (6, 12); strings and horns (6), creative direction, production, engineering

Additional musicians

- Owen Pallett – strings (5)

Technical personnel

- Rick Rubin – producer
- Ethan Mates – engineering
- Andrew Hayes – engineering assistance, editor
- Jerry Johnson – drum technician
- Ryan DeMarti – production coordination
- Manny Marroquin – mixing
- Chris Galland – mixing assistance
- Del Bowers – mixing assistance
- Brian Gardner – mastering
- Brandon Parvini – artwork, creative director
- The Uprising Creative – art direction, design
- Frank Maddocks – LP icon design

Source: AllMusic and Living Things booklet.

== Charts ==
=== Weekly charts ===
Chart (2012)	Peak position
Australian Albums (ARIA)	2
Austrian Albums (Ö3 Austria)	1
Belgian Albums (Ultratop Flanders)	4
Belgian Albums (Ultratop Wallonia)	2
Canadian Albums (Billboard)	1
Czech Albums (ČNS IFPI)	1
Danish Albums (Hitlisten)	1
Dutch Albums (Album Top 100)	1
Finnish Albums (Suomen virallinen lista)	1
French Albums (SNEP)	2
German Albums (Offizielle Top 100)	1
Hong Kong Albums (IFPI)	2
Hungarian Albums (MAHASZ)	1
Indian Albums (IMI)	1
Irish Albums (IRMA)	2
Italian Albums (FIMI)	1
Japan Hot Albums (Billboard Japan)	2
Japanese Albums (Oricon)	2
Mexican Albums (Top 100 Mexico)	5
New Zealand Albums (RMNZ)	1
Norwegian Albums (VG-lista)	3
Polish Albums (ZPAV)	1
Portuguese Albums (AFP)	1
Russian Albums (TopHit)	1
Scottish Albums (Official Charts)	2
Slovak Albums (Rádio – Top 100)	1
South African Albums (RISA)	5
South Korean Albums (Circle)	7
South Korean International Albums (Circle)	2
Spanish Albums (Promusicae)	2
Swedish Albums (Sverigetopplistan)	6
Swiss Albums (Romandie)	1
Swiss Albums (Schweizer Hitparade)	1
Taiwanese Albums (G-Music)	1
UK Albums (Official Charts)	1
UK Rock & Metal Albums (Official Charts)	1
US Billboard 200	1
US Top Alternative Albums (Billboard)	1
US Top Hard Rock Albums (Billboard)	1
US Top Rock Albums (Billboard)	1

Chart (2017)	Peak position
Australian Albums (ARIA)	40
Croatian Albums (HDU)	37
Polish Albums (ZPAV)	31

=== Year-end charts ===
Chart (2012)	Position
Argentine Albums (CAPIF)	67
Australian Albums (ARIA)	49
Austrian Albums (Ö3 Austria)	21
Belgian Albums (Ultratop Flanders)	84
Belgian Albums (Ultratop Wallonia)	44
Canadian Albums (Billboard)	44
Danish Albums (Hitlisten)	56
Dutch Albums (Album Top 100)	73
Finnish Albums (Suomen virallinen lista)	8
French Albums (SNEP)	48
German Albums (Offizielle Top 100)	10
Hungarian Albums (MAHASZ)	62
Italian Albums (FIMI)	46
Japan Hot Albums (Billboard Japan)	69
Japanese Albums (Oricon)	43
Mexican Albums (Top 100 Mexico)	94
New Zealand Albums (RMNZ)	33
Polish Albums (ZPAV)	86
Russian Albums (2M)	12
South Korean International Albums (Gaon)	22
Swiss Albums (Schweizer Hitparade)	14
UK Albums (OCC)	92
US Billboard 200	40
US Alternative Albums (Billboard)	9
US Hard Rock Albums (Billboard)	2
US Top Rock Albums (Billboard)	9
Worldwide Albums (IFPI)	19

Chart (2013)	Position
German Albums (Offizielle Top 100)	80
Swiss Albums (Schweizer Hitparade)	98
US Hard Rock Albums (Billboard)	20

Chart (2014)	Position
Indian Albums (IMI)	89

== Certifications ==
Region	Certification	Certified units/sales
Australia (ARIA)	Gold	35,000^{^}
Austria (IFPI Austria)	Platinum	20,000^{*}
Denmark (IFPI Danmark)	Gold	10,000^{‡}
Finland (Musiikkituottajat)	Gold	12,032
France (SNEP)	Platinum	100,000^{*}
Germany (BVMI)	5× Gold	500,000^{‡}
India (IMI)	2× Gold	72,000^
Italy (FIMI)	Platinum	50,000^{‡}
Japan (RIAJ)	Gold	100,000^{^}
New Zealand (RMNZ)	Platinum	15,000^{‡}
Poland (ZPAV)	Gold	10,000^{*}
Russia (NFPF)	Gold	5,000^{*}
Switzerland (IFPI Switzerland)	Platinum	30,000^{^}
United Kingdom (BPI)	Gold	100,000^{^}
United States (RIAA)	Platinum	1,000,000^{‡}
Summaries
Worldwide (2012)	—	1,700,000
^{*} Sales figures based on certification alone.^{^} Shipments figures based on certification alone.^{‡} Sales+streaming figures based on certification alone.

== Release history ==
Region	Date	Label	Format	Catalog
Japan	June 20, 2012	Warner Bros.	CD	WPCR-14496
Russia	June 21, 2012	Warner Bros.	CD	4690355004127
Ukraine	June 21, 2012	Warner Bros.	CD	
Belarus	June 21, 2012	Warner Bros.	CD	
Kazakhstan	June 21, 2012	Warner Bros.	CD	
Australia	June 22, 2012	Warner Bros.	CD, digital	9362495048
Austria	June 22, 2012	Warner Bros.	CD, digital	9362495048
Belgium	June 22, 2012	Warner Bros.	CD, digital	9362495048
Croatia	June 22, 2012	Warner Bros.	CD, digital	9362495048
Germany	June 22, 2012	Warner Bros.	CD, digital	9362495048
Greece	June 22, 2012	Warner Bros.	CD, digital	9362495048
India	June 22, 2012	Warner Bros.	CD	9362495048
Ireland	June 22, 2012	Warner Bros.	CD, digital	9362495048
Italy	June 22, 2012	Warner Bros.	CD, digital	9362495048
Netherlands	June 22, 2012	Warner Bros.	CD, digital	9362495048
New Zealand	June 22, 2012	Warner Bros.	CD, digital	9362495048
Norway	June 22, 2012	Warner Bros.	CD, digital	9362495048
Singapore	June 22, 2012	Warner Bros.	CD	495048TS
Slovakia	June 22, 2012	Warner Bros.		9362495048
Switzerland	June 22, 2012	Warner Bros.	CD, digital	9362495048
Malaysia	June 24, 2012	Warner Bros.	CD, digital	9362495048
Denmark	June 25, 2012	Warner Bros.	CD, digital	9362495048
France	June 25, 2012	Warner Bros.	CD, digital	9362495048
Poland	June 25, 2012	Warner Bros.	CD, digital	9362495048
Portugal	June 25, 2012	Warner Bros.	CD, digital	9362495048
United Kingdom	June 25, 2012	Warner Bros.	CD, digital	9362495007
Brazil	June 26, 2012	Warner Bros.	CD, digital	
Canada	June 26, 2012	Warner Bros.	CD, digital	9362495048
Chile	June 26, 2012	Warner Bros.	CD	9362495048
Mexico	June 26, 2012	Warner Bros.	CD, digital	93624950486
Turkey	June 26, 2012	Warner Bros.	CD, digital	9362495048
United States	June 26, 2012	Warner Bros.	CD, digital	9362495048
Argentina	June 27, 2012	Warner Bros.	CD	
Finland	June 27, 2012	Warner Bros.	CD, digital	9362495048
Israel	July 4, 2012	Warner Bros.	CD	9362495048

== Living Things (Acapellas and Instrumentals) ==
Living Things (Acapellas and Instrumentals)

Studio album by Linkin Park
- Released: June 25, 2012
- Recorded: March 2011 – April 2012 at NRG Recording Studios (North Hollywood, California)
- Genres: Alternative rock; electronic rock; a cappella
- Length: 1:08:12
- Labels: Warner Bros.; Machine Shop
- Producers: Rick Rubin; Mike Shinoda

Living Things (Acapellas and Instrumentals) is the first instrumental and a capella tracks album performed by American rock band Linkin Park, taken from their fifth studio album Living Things. The album was released on iTunes, and was released through Warner Bros. and Machine Shop on June 25, 2012, it was produced by Rick Rubin and Mike Shinoda. This album was released before the release of Living Things on June 26, 2012. The album was released by Linkin Park after Shinoda heard all the remixes of their songs by other producers, and it was confirmed on their official website.

=== Track listing ===
No.	Title	Length
1.	"Lost in the Echo" (Instrumental)	3:25
2.	"In My Remains" (Instrumental)	3:20
3.	"Burn It Down" (Instrumental)	3:50
4.	"Lies Greed Misery" (Instrumental)	2:26
5.	"I'll Be Gone" (Instrumental)	3:32
6.	"Castle of Glass" (Instrumental)	3:25
7.	"Victimized" (Instrumental)	1:48
8.	"Roads Untraveled" (Instrumental)	3:50
9.	"Skin to Bone" (Instrumental)	2:48
10.	"Until It Breaks" (Instrumental)	3:55
11.	"Tinfoil / Powerless" (Instrumental)	5:03
12.	"Lost in the Echo" (A cappella)	2:56
13.	"In My Remains" (A cappella)	2:43
14.	"Burn It Down" (A cappella)	2:56
15.	"Lies Greed Misery" (A cappella)	2:14
16.	"I'll Be Gone" (A cappella)	2:59
17.	"Castle of Glass" (A cappella)	2:49
18.	"Victimized" (A cappella)	1:14
19.	"Roads Untraveled" (A cappella)	3:11
20.	"Skin to Bone" (A cappella)	2:37
21.	"Until It Breaks" (A cappella)	3:43
22.	"Powerless" (A cappella)	3:26
Total length:		1:08:12
