= Lost in the Echo =

Single by Linkin Park

from the album Living Things
- B-side: "Lost in the Echo" (KillSonik Remix)
- Released: October 5, 2012
- Recorded: March 2012
- Genre: Alternative rock; rap rock; electronic rock
- Length: 3:25
- Label: Warner Bros.
- Composer: Linkin Park
- Lyricists: Chester Bennington; Mike Shinoda
- Producers: Mike Shinoda; Rick Rubin

Linkin Park singles chronology
"Burn It Down" (2012)	"Lost in the Echo" (2012)	"Powerless" (2012)

Music video
- "Lost in the Echo" on YouTube "Lost in the Echo" (Lyric Video) on YouTube

"Lost in the Echo" (stylized in all-caps) is a song by American rock band Linkin Park, from their fifth studio album, Living Things. The song impacted radio stations, as well as a digital download, on October 5, 2012. The song was written by the band and produced by co-lead vocalist Mike Shinoda and Rick Rubin. It received mixed to positive reviews from music critics.

== Background ==
"Lost In The Echo"
A sample of "Lost In The Echo" where lead singer Chester Bennington sings the chorus.

In the video "Inside Living Things", it was revealed that the working title of "Lost in the Echo" was "Holding Company". The band recorded the song in March 2012. In an interview with The Huffington Post, Mike Shinoda, the band's rapper and producer, stated that the song "was one of those moments that defined what this album was going to be about." He also expressed his surprise when, despite the band's dislike for songs that sounded like their earlier material, appreciated the song, saying:

The thing about "Lost in the Echo" was it sounded a lot like what the "song" sounds like, I think. When the guys heard it, I kind of said to them, "What do you think about that?" and their responses, for the first time in a few years, were pretty good. They were like, "Yeah, we hear the merit. Let's develop that idea. Let's see what we want to do." I said to them, "You know, this is like a real moment for us, now, on this album."

== Critical reception ==
The song received mixed to positive reviews from music critics. Jason Lipshutz of Billboard praised the song's "bubbling synthesizers [that] quickly morph into crunching guitars". Nathan Taft of The Daily of the University of Washington called "Lost in the Echo" "probably the best track on the whole album", noting the song's electronic beats that transitions into "a heavier, distorted guitar riff". Chad Childers of Loudwire opined that for fans, the song "fits right in with what they've done in the past." Tim Grierson of About.com was mixed about the song, describing the music as "compelling" compared to the "dull lyrics that are a call to action to the audience". Emily MacKay of NME was negative about the song, calling it "radio-friendly videogame metal." Taft, Childers and Lipshutz praised the vocal interplay of Shinoda and lead singer Chester Bennington, with the latter noting that the duo "remains ever intact", while MacKay panned the combination, criticizing the vocals as "horrifically overwrought" and the raps "clunky".

== Music video ==
Example of the effects in the video, when the characters crumbled to dust.

Aspiring rapper "Gino the Ghost", who plays the video's lead character, confirmed on Twitter that he would be filming a music video for "Lost in the Echo". Filming commenced in Detroit, Michigan from July 1 and 2, 2012. Models Melanie Boria and Carly Francavilla were also cast in the video. Eventually, Shinoda also confirmed that the video of "Lost in the Echo" was under production. The song's lyric video was released on June 29, 2012. Chad Childers of Loudwire noted that the lyric video had "an unknown member of the band [who] appears to have been captured falling into a bog of grass, dirt, and perhaps seaweed."

The official music video premiered on the song's official website on August 29, 2012. Shinoda stated that the video is an interactive video, "designed to draw you into the world of the song". The video was co-directed by Jason Zada and Jason Nickel. The video requires a connection to an account in Facebook to access the interactive video, and pulls in images from the website to create the video's story. Nickel stated in an interview with Wired that the video aims to "tie your personal life into the actual story, so that it's logical and it seems like it was actually created for you rather than kind of shoehorned in there just because we could do it." Aaron Ray, the head of The Collective which managed that band's digital assets, said in an interview with HypeBot that the video's creative process took several months through different evolutions.

Shinoda also worked closely with Nickel and Zada in production of the video, stating that the video "touched on some of [the fans' personal memories that] felt like it fit with the song really well." Shinoda, in an interview with The Huffington Post, said that they "[tried] something extra personal with the video" because Living Things was more of a personal record. In an interview with Noisecreep, he also said that the video "is an example of us trying something different – and next time it won't be this. It will evolve. For this video you have to have Facebook and Flash – next time I'd love to do something that even includes people without those things." Shinoda found his experience with the video to be humorous, because "half the pictures were of dogs, landscapes, and random silly things...It was hilarious to watch this video pull those pictures and see the characters in the video break down in tears over a picture of a ham sandwich."

The video takes place in a post-apocalyptic future where photographs do not exist, and features a man walking with a briefcase into ruined buildings. Upon entering the building, the man opens the case, and distributes the photos to numerous people. The photos consist of numerous images from the accessed Facebook account. The characters, upon viewing the photos, exhibit "extreme emotional responses" to the images. The characters would then crumble into dust. As for the band, they do not appear in this video except for pictures in the suitcase at the beginning, and once at the end if looked closely.

On September 4, 2012 a non-interactive version of the video was uploaded to the band's official YouTube channel. The video won Best Interactive Music Video award at O Music Awards in 2013.

=== Reception ===
The music video for "Lost in the Echo" received positive reviews, although numerous critics noted that the implementation of Facebook photos made the experience range from serious to humorous. Lewis Wallace of Wired described the video as "atmospheric." A reviewer of Music News noted that "the serious storyline of the video was interrupted by a few dumb-arse silly photos of my friends" and that the pictures would only fit in the story "if your friends are all dark, emo types." David La Rosa of Running Lip praised "the post-apocalyptic set and emotive acting [that] perfectly complement the intense tone and lyrics of the song." Hisham Dahud of HypeBot affirmed that the video is a "strong step forward for interactive content experiences", despite the numerous experiences that would result in the video being either serious or "inadvertently hilarious."

== Personnel ==
- Chester Bennington – lead vocals
- Mike Shinoda – rap vocals, rhythm guitar, keyboards
- Brad Delson – lead guitar
- Dave "Phoenix" Farrell – bass guitar, backing vocals, sampler
- Rob Bourdon – drums, percussion
- Joe Hahn – synthesizers, sampling, programming, backing vocals

== Track listing ==
All tracks are written by Linkin Park.

UK digital single - 1st version
No.	Title	Length
1.	"Lost in the Echo"	3:25
2.	"Lost in the Echo" (KillSonik Remix)	5:09
3.	"Lost in the Echo" (KillSonik Remix) (Edit)	3:30

UK digital single - 2nd version
No.	Title	Length
1.	"Lost in the Echo"	3:25
2.	"Lost in the Echo" (KillSonik Remix)	5:09

UK promotional CD single
No.	Title	Length
1.	"Lost in the Echo" (Album Version)	3:25
2.	"Lost in the Echo" (Instrumental Version)	3:25

== Charts ==
=== Weekly charts ===
Weekly chart performance for "Lost in the Echo"
Chart (2012)	Peak position
Belgium (Ultratip Bubbling Under Flanders)	83
Canada Rock (Billboard)	40
France (SNEP)	150
Germany (GfK)	68
Lebanon (The Official Lebanese Top 20)	12
South Korean International Singles (Gaon Chart)	7
UK Singles (OCC)	175
UK Rock & Metal (Official Charts)	4
US Billboard Hot 100	95
US Hot Rock & Alternative Songs (Billboard)	10
US Rock & Alternative Airplay (Billboard)	7
Venezuela (Record Report)	117

=== Year-end charts ===
Year-end chart performance for "Lost in the Echo"
Chart (2012)	Position
US Hot Rock & Alternative Songs (Billboard)	48

== Certifications ==
Certifications for "Lost in the Echo"
Region	Certification	Certified units/sales
United States (RIAA)	Gold	500,000^{‡}
^{‡} Sales+streaming figures based on certification alone.
