= Pay the Girl (album) =

Studio album by Pay the Girl
- Released: March 4, 2003
- Recorded: 2002–2003
- Genre: Alternative rock; pop rock
- Length: 45:29
- Label: TVT Records
- Producer: Matt Senatore; Rich Liggett; Rick Parashar; Kelly Gray

Pay the Girl chronology
Demo EP (2002)	Pay the Girl (2003)

Pay the Girl is the self-titled debut studio album released by American rock band Pay the Girl. It is their only studio album release to date. It was released on March 4, 2003, under TVT Records, which is now defunct.

Five producers lent their producing abilities to the album: Matt Senatore, Rich Liggett, Rick Parashar, Wally Gagel, and Kelly Gray.

The album includes many musicians from popular rock bands, such as Rich Hopkins from American alternative rock band The Sidewinders, Jeremy Hora from Canadian hard rock band Default (he also lent his songwriting talents to the track "So Without"), Bardi Martin from American grunge band Candlebox, Darrell Phillips from American rock band Sister 7, and Brad Smith from American alternative rock band Blind Melon.

The track "Clueless" was featured on the soundtrack of the 2002 teen psychological thriller film Swimfan. It is also credited as their most popular song, whilst "Freeze" and "Beverly" are considered highly as well.

With the release of the album, their sound was often compared to American alternative rock bands Matchbox Twenty and The Verve Pipe.

== Track listing ==
No.	Title	Writer(s)	Producer(s)	Length
1.	"Freeze"	Jason Phelps; Kevin Fox; Daniel Fisher; Jeffrey Pence; Christopher Estes; Matt Senatore	Matt Senatore; Mark Liggett	3:45
2.	"Beverly"	Jason Phelps; Brian Lovely; Kevin Fox; Curtis Benton; Jeffrey Pence; Matt Senatore	Rick Parashar	3:41
3.	"Clueless"	Jason Phelps; Brian Lovely; Jeffrey Pence; Matt Senatore	Matt Senatore; Mark Liggett	3:56
4.	"All You Are"	Jason Phelps; Shelly Peiken	Wally Gagel	3:57
5.	"Junkie"	Jason Phelps; Michael Georgin; Joshua Seurkamp; Drew Phillips; Mark Cooper	Matt Senatore; Rich Liggett	3:43
6.	"Traded"	Jason Phelps; Drew Phillips; Michael Georgin; Mark Cooper	Rick Parashar	3:50
7.	"I'm Not Like You"	Jason Phelps; Walt Aldridge	Rick Parashar	3:44
8.	"In Between"	Jason Phelps; Mark Cooper; Michael Georgin; Joshua Seurkamp; Drew Phillips	Matt Senatore; Rich Liggett	3:39
9.	"Gravity"	Jason Phelps; Walt Aldridge	Matt Senatore; Rich Liggett	4:01
10.	"So Without"	Jason Phelps; Drew Phillips; Jeremy Hora	Kelly Gray	3:46
11.	"Perfect"	Jason Phelps; Brian Lovely; Matt Senatore	Matt Senatore; Rich Liggett	3:43
12.	"We Both Lose"	Jason Phelps; Stephen Trask	Rick Parashar	3:49
Total length:				45:29

== Personnel ==
- Jason Allen Phelps – lead vocals, guitar
- Mark Cooper – background vocals, guitar
- Dave Harris – guitar
- Drew Phillips – bass guitar
- Greg Braun – drums

Additional personnel

- Matt Chamberlain – percussion
- Rich Hopkins – keyboards
- Jeremy James Hora – guitar
- Bardi Martin – bass
- Darrell Phillips – bass
- Scott Rockenfield – percussion
- C.P. Roth – keyboards
- Eric Schermerhorn – guitar
- Brad Smith – bass
- Jonathan Yudkin – strings

Production

- Amy Duarte – production coordination
- Kelly Gray – engineer, mixing, producer
- Rick Kerr – mixing
- Jerry Lane – engineer, mixing
- Mark Liggett – producer
- Geoff Ott – engineer
- Rick Parashar – engineer, mixing, producer
- Tony Schloss – assistant engineer
- Matthew "Ammo" Senatore – producer
