= Elocation =

Studio album by Default
- Released: November 25, 2003
- Genre: Post-grunge; alternative metal
- Length: 46:18
- Label: TVT
- Producer: Rick Parashar; Butch Walker; Chad Kroeger

Default chronology
The Fallout (2001)	Elocation (2003)	One Thing Remains (2005)

Singles from Elocation
- 1. "(Taking My) Life Away" Released: October 11, 2003; 2. "Throw It All Away" Released: March 2, 2004; 3. "All She Wrote" Released: 2004

Professional ratings
Review scores
Source	Rating
Allmusic	2/5 stars

Elocation is the second studio album by Canadian hard rock band Default. It was released on November 25, 2003, by TVT Records. The rock album spawned three singles, including the song "(Taking My) Life Away", which aired on Muzak's Power Rock station. This album failed to match the success of their debut, but is the band's second most commercially successful album, being certified Gold in Canada. The final track, an acoustic version of "Let You Down," originally appeared on their previous album.

The album was produced by Butch Walker and Nickelback's Chad Kroeger and contains a cover of the song "Cruel" by Jeff Buckley.

== Commercial performance ==
Elocation debuted at #49 on the Canadian Albums Chart.

== Critical reception ==
Tom Harrison of The Province rated the album three stars out of four. He thought that the band showed creative growth from their previous album.

== Track listing ==
All tracks are written by Default except where noted.

No.	Title	Writer(s)	Length
1.	"Who Followed Who?"	Default; Butch Walker	3:24
2.	"(Taking My) Life Away"	Default; Jim Vallance	4:12
3.	"Movin' On"		3:31
4.	"Throw It All Away"	Default; Chad Kroeger	3:29
5.	"Cruel"	Jeff Buckley; Gary Lucas	4:39
6.	"Made to Lie"	Default; Rick Parashar	3:15
7.	"Crossing the Line"		2:35
8.	"Without You"	Default; Parashar	3:40
9.	"Break Down Doors"		3:03
10.	"Enough"		3:38
11.	"All She Wrote"		4:00
12.	"Alone"		3:23
13.	"Let You Down (Acoustic)" (bonus track)		3:29

Bonus tracks

1. "Cruel" (acoustic) – 4:25 (from a TVT Records sampler 2005) (German Count on Me CDS)
2. "(Taking My) Life Away" (acoustic) – 4:10 (from a 2003 promotional test pressing CD single)

== Personnel ==
Default

- Dallas Smith – lead vocals
- Jeremy James Hora – guitar, backing vocals
- Dave Benedict – bass guitar
- Danny Craig – drums

Additional musicians

- Rick Hopkins – organ (tracks 2, 6, 8)
- Gordie Johnson – slide guitar (track 5)
- Brian Lencho – tabla (track 10)
- Christian Mock – percussion and keyboard programming (track 8)
- Rick Parashar – tambura (track 10), piano (tracks 1–10, 12)
- Jon Plum – percussion and keyboard programming (track 8)
- Butch Walker – piano (track 11)

Technical personnel

- Alex Aligizakis – assistant engineer (track 4)
- Ryan Anderson – Pro Tools operator (track 4)
- Neal Avron – mixing (tracks 1–12)
- Jose Borges – mixing assistant (tracks 1–12)
- Rusty Cobb – engineer (tracks 1, 11)
- Kenny Creswell – drum technician (tracks 1, 11)
- JT Hall – assistant engineer (tracks 1, 11)
- Selena Hollebone – 2nd assistant engineer (track 4)
- Phil Klum – mastering
- Chad Kroeger – producer (track 4)
- Sean Loughlin – assistant engineer (tracks 1, 11)
- Clay Patrick McBride – photography
- Christian Mock – engineer and Pro Tools (tracks 2, 3, 5–10, 12)
- Joey Moi – producer (track 4), engineer (tracks 4, 13)
- Rick Parashar – producer, engineer, and Pro Tools (tracks 2, 3, 5–10, 12)
- Christie Pride – production coordinator (tracks 1, 11)
- Honchol Sin – assistant engineer (tracks 2, 3, 5–10, 12)
- Butch Walker – producer (tracks 1, 11)
- Leonard B. Johnson – A&R
- Benjamin Wheelock – design

== Charts and certifications ==
Album

Chart (2003)	Peak position
US Billboard 200	105
US Independent Albums (Billboard)	3

Singles

Year	Single	Chart	Position
2003	"(Taking My) Life Away"	US Hot Mainstream Rock Tracks	25
2003	"(Taking My) Life Away"	US Hot Adult Top 40 Tracks	30
2004	"Throw It All Away"	US Hot Mainstream Rock Tracks	30
2004	"All She Wrote"	US Hot Adult Top 40 Tracks	39

=== Certifications ===
Country	Certification	Sales
Canada	Gold	50,000+
