= Wasting My Time =

2001 single by Default

Single by Default

from the album The Fallout
- B-side: "Blind"; "Slow Me Down"; "Deny"
- Released: August 28, 2001
- Genre: Post-grunge
- Length: 4:29 (album version); 3:59 (radio version)
- Label: TVT
- Songwriters: Dallas Smith; Jeremy Hora; Dave Benedict; Danny Craig
- Producers: Chad Kroeger; Rick Parashar

Default singles chronology
| "Wasting My Time" (2001) | "Deny" (2002) |

Music video
- "Wasting My Time" on YouTube

"Wasting My Time" is a song by Canadian rock band Default for their debut studio album, The Fallout (2001). It was released as their debut single on August 28, 2001. The song was written by the members of the band and produced by Chad Kroeger and Rick Parashar. "Wasting My Time" is Default's most commercially successful song, having reached number 13 on the US Billboard Hot 100 chart and numbers two and three, respectively, on the Billboard Mainstream Rock Tracks and Modern Rock Tracks charts. It was also their first of three singles to top the Canadian rock airplay chart.

== Composition ==
"Wasting My Time" was written by Default (Dallas Smith, Jeremy Hora, Dave Benedict, and Danny Craig) and was produced by Chad Kroeger and Rick Parashar. The song is a power ballad that draws on influences of various rock genres and lasts for four minutes and twenty-nine seconds. (Note: Length of the full version featured on The Fallout.) According to the sheet music published by EMI Music Publishing, it is set in common time to a "moderate rock" tempo of 120 BPM. "Wasting My Time" was originally composed in the key of D major and follows a chord progression of D_{sus9}–G_{sus9} in the verses and G_{5}–B_{5}–G_{5}–A_{5} in the chorus. Smith's vocal range on the track spans one full octave, from A_{4} to A_{5}.

Musically, the song features melodic verses of singing and clean, bright guitar picking. This moves into a hard-hitting, wailing chorus and a distorted guitar solo as the interlude. Eric Aiese of Billboard described the song as having an "early-90s grunge sound" while also noting the influence of alternative rock in its production. The song's lyrics find the narrator contemplating if he is wasting his time investing in a dead-end relationship.

== Music video ==
A music video was filmed for the song and centers around a woman waiting for her companion. They finally meet at the end and embrace. Band performance fills the majority of the video and takes place in the woman's wrist watch, with the top part showing the city show through glass with the watch hands rotating around the band. The video contains scenes shot in downtown Toronto, Ontario outside the Westin Harbour Castle. It was directed by Noble Jones and premiered on August 7, 2001. The video has a guest appearance by Chad Kroeger in a scene where one man was fighting or struggling against three others.

== Track listings ==
Australian CD single
| No. | Title | Writer(s) | Length |
|---|---|---|---|
| 1. | "Wasting My Time" | Dallas Smith; Jeremy Hora; Dave Benedict; Danny Craig | 3:56 |
| 2. | "Slow Me Down" | Smith; Hora; Benedict; Craig; Chad Kroeger | 3:23 |
| 3. | "Deny" (acoustic) | Smith; Hora; Benedict; Craig; Kroeger | 3:54 |
| Total length: | | | 11:17 |

UK, US, and Canadian CD single
| No. | Title | Writer(s) | Length |
|---|---|---|---|
| 1. | "Wasting My Time" (radio edit) | Smith; Hora; Benedict; Craig | 3:59 |
| 2. | "Wasting My Time" (acoustic) | Smith; Hora; Benedict; Craig | 4:19 |
| 3. | "Blind" | Smith; Hora; Benedict; Craig; Kroeger | 3:10 |
| 4. | "Wasting My Time" (video) | | 4:06 |
| Total length: | | | 15:34 |

== Charts ==
=== Weekly charts ===
Weekly chart performance for "Wasting My Time"
| Chart (2002–2003) | Peak position |
|---|---|
| Australia (ARIA) | 43 |
| Canada Rock Airplay (Nielsen SoundScan) | 1 |
| Netherlands (Single Top 100) | 97 |
| New Zealand (Recorded Music NZ) | 37 |
| Quebec Airplay (ADISQ) | 16 |
| Scotland Singles (OCC) | 71 |
| UK Singles (OCC) | 73 |
| UK Airplay (Music & Media) | 20 |
| UK Rock & Metal (OCC) | 6 |
| US Billboard Hot 100 | 13 |
| US Adult Top 40 (Billboard) | 14 |
| US Mainstream Rock Tracks (Billboard) | 2 |
| US Mainstream Top 40 (Billboard) | 11 |
| US Modern Rock Tracks (Billboard) | 3 |
| US Top 40 Tracks (Billboard) | 13 |

=== Year end charts ===
2001 year-end chart performance for "Wasting My Time"
| Chart (2001) | Position |
|---|---|
| Canada Radio (Nielsen BDS) | 79 |
| US Modern Rock Tracks (Billboard) | 83 |

2002 year-end chart performance for "Wasting My Time"
| Chart (2002) | Position |
|---|---|
| Canada Radio (Nielsen BDS) | 24 |
| US Adult Top 40 (Billboard) | 29 |
| US Billboard Hot 100 | 26 |
| US Mainstream Rock Tracks (Billboard) | 4 |
| US Mainstream Top 40 (Billboard) | 37 |
| US Modern Rock Tracks (Billboard) | 8 |

=== Decade-end charts ===
Decade-end chart performance for "Wasting My Time"
| Chart (2000–2009) | Position |
|---|---|
| US Hot Rock Songs (Billboard) | 18 |

== Release history ==
Release dates and formats for "Wasting My Time"
| Region | Date | Format(s) | Label(s) | Ref. |
|---|---|---|---|---|
| United States | August 28, 2001 | Mainstream rock; active rock; alternative radio | TVT | |
| Australia | February 11, 2002 | CD | TVT; Festival Mushroom | |
| United Kingdom | January 27, 2003 | CD | Island | |
