= Giants Stadium =

Former stadium in East Rutherford, New Jersey

- The Meadowlands; Home of the New York Giants

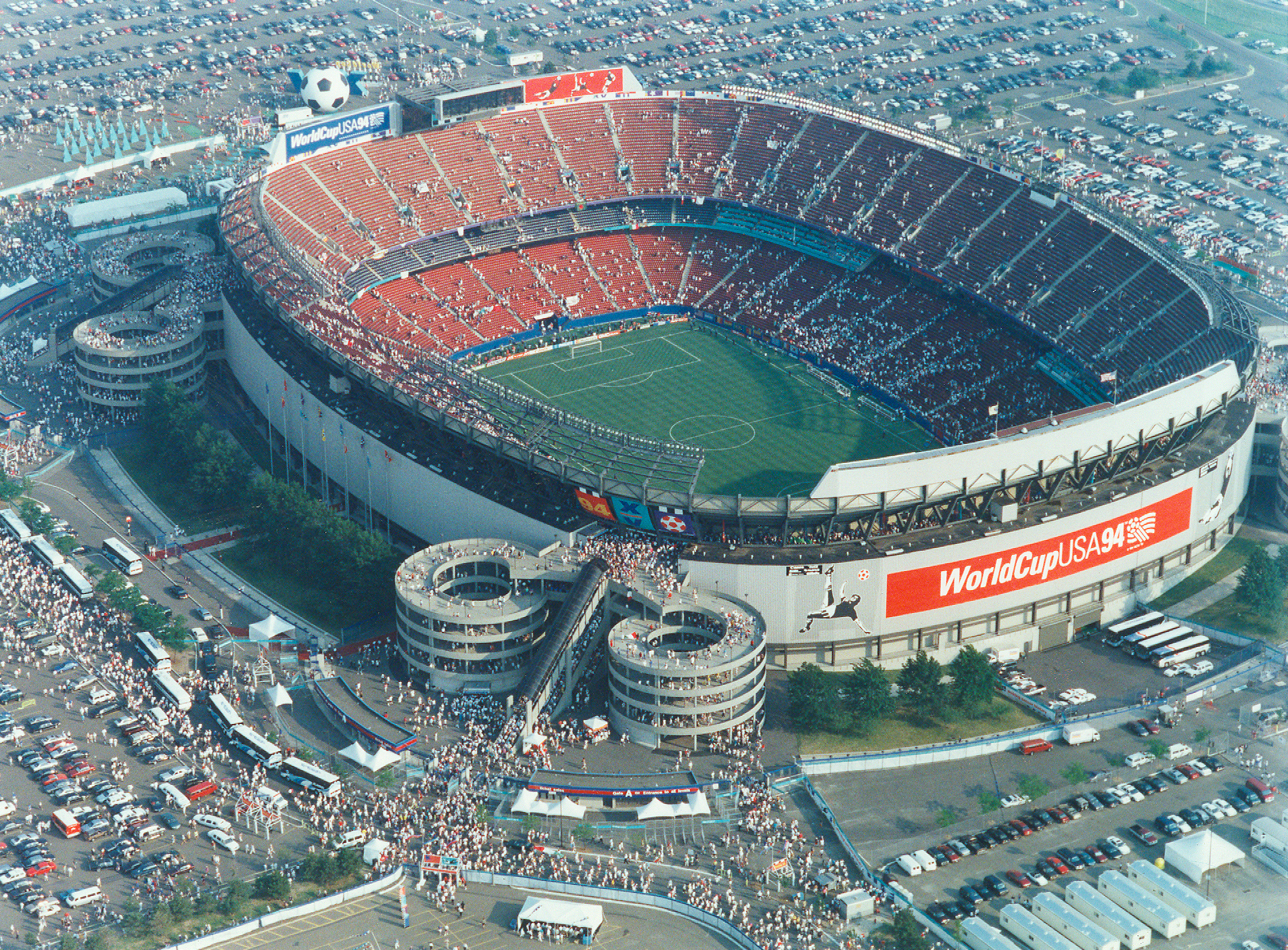
- Giants Stadium during the 1994 FIFA World Cup
- Interactive map of Giants Stadium
- Address: 50 Route 120
- Location: East Rutherford, New Jersey
- Coordinates: 40°48′44″N 74°4′37″W
- Owner: New Jersey Sports and Exposition Authority
- Operator: New Jersey Sports and Exposition Authority
- Capacity: 80,242
- Surface: AstroTurf (1976–1999); Grass (2000–2002); FieldTurf (2003–2009)

Construction
- Groundbreaking: November 19, 1972
- Opened: October 10, 1976; 50 years ago
- Closed: January 3, 2010; 16 years ago (final game)
- Demolished: February 4 – August 10, 2010
- Cost: US$78 million ($441 million in 2025 dollars)
- Architects: Kivett and Myers; Ewing Cole Erdman & Eubank; Clauss & Nolan
- General contractor: George A. Fuller Company

Tenants
- New York Giants (NFL) 1976–2009; New York Cosmos (NASL) 1977–1984; Garden State Bowl (NCAA) 1978–1981; New Jersey Generals (USFL) 1983–1985; New York Jets (NFL) 1984–2009; New York/New Jersey Knights (WLAF) 1991–1992; Rutgers Scarlet Knights (NCAA) 1993; MetroStars/New York Red Bulls (MLS) 1996–2009; New York/New Jersey Hitmen (XFL) 2001; New York Sentinels (UFL) 2009

Giants Stadium (sometimes referred to as Giants Stadium at the Meadowlands) was a stadium located in East Rutherford, New Jersey, in the Meadowlands Sports Complex. The venue was open from 1976 to 2010, and primarily hosted sporting events and concerts. It was the home field of the New York metropolitan area's two National Football League teams, the New York Giants (from 1976 to 2009) and the New York Jets (from 1984 to 2009). It also was the home field of two New York metro area professional soccer teams, the NASL's New York Cosmos (from 1977 to 1984) and Major League Soccer's New York Red Bulls (from 1996 to 2009).

The stadium's maximum seating capacity was 80,242. The structure was 756 feet (230 m) long, 592 feet (180 m) wide and 144 feet (44 m) high from service level to the top of the seating bowl and 178 feet (54 m) high to the top of the south tower. The volume of the stadium was 64.5 million cubic feet (1,830,000 m^{3}), and 13,500 tons of structural steel were used in the building process while 29,200 tons of concrete were poured. It was owned and operated by the New Jersey Sports and Exposition Authority (NJSEA). The stadium's field was aligned northwest to southeast, with the press box along the southwest sideline.

In the early 1970s, the New York Giants were sharing Yankee Stadium with the New York Yankees baseball team, and began looking for a home of their own. The Giants struck a deal with the fledgling New Jersey Sports and Exposition Authority in 1971 and broke ground on the construction of the new facility in 1972. The Giants' last full season in Yankee Stadium was 1972, as the ballpark was closed for a massive reconstruction following the end of the Yankees' 1973 season. Since their new stadium would take a significant amount of time to finish, and they could not use their home facility due to the construction, the Giants moved out of state and played in New Haven, Connecticut at the Yale Bowl from October 1973 through 1974, but won just once in twelve games there. They returned to New York for one final season in 1975 and shared Shea Stadium in Flushing, Queens, with the Yankees, Mets, and Jets. The Giants finally moved into their new home on October 10, 1976, week five of the season.

Eight years after opening Giants Stadium gained a second team as The Jets' Shea Stadium lease expired at the end of the 1983 season and team owner Leon Hess was having trouble negotiating terms of a new lease to stay in Queens. New York City was unwilling to agree to his terms and Hess decided to move the Jets to the Meadowlands permanently (the team previously played a regular season game there in 1977). Their first game in Giants Stadium was on September 6, 1984. With the Jets now playing at the stadium, the grounds crew needed to find a way to set their games apart from Giants games and make them more inviting for their fans and eventually came up with a series of green and white banners and coverings that were hung over the field-level blue walls that circled the stadium and (later) the four entrance gates outside the stadium. The Jets also called the stadium "The Meadowlands" for their games.

The sharing of the stadium by both the Giants and Jets enabled it to break a record that had long been held by Chicago's Wrigley Field. Entering the 2003 season, its 28th, Giants Stadium had played host to 364 NFL games, second only to the 365 played at Wrigley by the Chicago Bears in their 50 seasons there. The Giants' season opening game with the St. Louis Rams tied the record, and the following week the Jets' home opener against the Miami Dolphins broke it.

Giants Stadium was also home to the New York Cosmos, a professional soccer team of the North American Soccer League (1968–84), that attracted record crowds during the late 1970s. The stadium was later home to another soccer team, the New York/New Jersey MetroStars (now the New York Red Bulls) of Major League Soccer, who played there from 1996 to 2009.

Giants Stadium closed following the 2009 NFL season following the construction of MetLife Stadium in the surrounding parking lot. The stadium's final event was the January 3, 2010, game featuring the Jets hosting the Cincinnati Bengals on Sunday Night Football. Demolition of the structure began a month after the game and was completed on August 10, 2010. The New York Giants and New York Jets both moved to MetLife Stadium in 2010.

== History ==
Giants Stadium was the first major league sporting venue in New Jersey (though the Brooklyn Dodgers had played seven home games at Roosevelt Stadium in Jersey City in 1956 and 1957), and its success, along with that of the Giants in the 1980s was a major impetus behind increased pride and enthusiasm among New Jersey residents.

The stadiums' modernist design was heavily inspired by Arrowhead Stadium. The firm Kivett and Myers, architects of both stadiums, specifically borrowed the overall layout, intimacy and exterior spiral ramps of Arrowhead and enhanced those features.

=== First year in business ===
Giants Stadium opened on October 10, 1976, as 76,042 fans witnessed a 24–14 loss by the Giants to the Dallas Cowboys. The Giants had played their first four games on the road that season. College football made its debut at Giants Stadium on October 23, 1976, with Rutgers University defeating Columbia 47–0 and extending their winning streak to 14 games.

=== Other pro football teams that have used Giants Stadium ===
Other professional football teams that have called Giants Stadium home over the years include the New Jersey Generals of the USFL; the New York/New Jersey Knights of the World League of American Football; the New York/New Jersey Hitmen of the XFL and the New York Sentinels (who played one game at the stadium in the United Football League's inaugural season). The 1985 USFL championship game which turned out to be the last USFL game played was held at Giants Stadium.

In the second week of the 2005 season, the New Orleans Saints used the stadium for a "home" game against the Giants because of extensive damage to the Louisiana Superdome after Hurricane Katrina. One end zone was painted in Saints colors, Saints banners were hung on the walls around the sidelines, and the Saints wore their home jerseys. The game was rescheduled to a Monday night with a special start time of 7:30 PM EDT, preceding the other scheduled game on Monday Night Football. The Giants were normally not visitors at Giants Stadium unless they were playing the Jets.

=== College football games ===
The stadium hosted college football games, including the Garden State Bowl from 1978 to 1981; the Kickoff Classic from 1983 to 2002; the New York Urban League Classic since 1981; a number of Rutgers homes games (including all their home games during the 1993 season); several Notre Dame–Navy and Notre Dame–Army games; and the Army–Navy Game on three occasions, most recently in 2002. Syracuse also played two home games at Giants Stadium during the 1979 season, against West Virginia and Penn State, while the Carrier Dome was under construction. Columbia also played some home games at Giants Stadium in 1983, due to construction at its home stadium. Temple, needing a home field due to a schedule conflict with Veterans Stadium in Philadelphia, used Giants Stadium as their home field versus Penn State in September 1996. Princeton also played one home game at Giants Stadium (against Yale) during the construction of Princeton's new stadium in 1997.

== Soccer at Giants Stadium ==
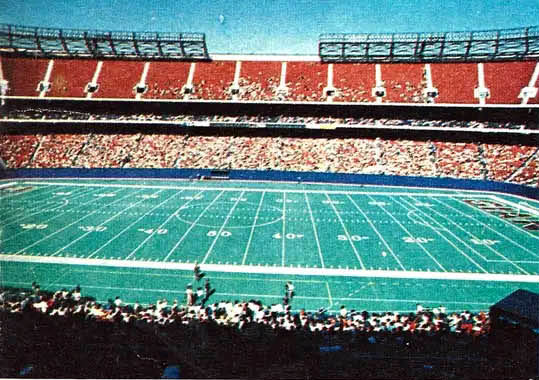
View of the stadium during a New York Cosmos v Boca Juniors match in September 1978

The New York Cosmos of the North American Soccer League moved to Giants Stadium for the 1977 season, hosting the final game of Brazilian star Pelé on October 1, 1977. Giants Stadium remained as the home venue for the Cosmos until the league folded in 1985. Additionally, the NASL championship game Soccer Bowl '78 and Soccer Bowl '79 were held at Giants Stadium.

Seven games of the 1994 FIFA World Cup soccer tournament were held at Giants Stadium (including the Italy v Bulgaria semifinal), along with four games of the 1999 FIFA Women's World Cup.

In 2003, the SuperCoppa Italiana, an annual match pitting the winners of Serie A (Italy's top division) and the Coppa Italia (Italian Cup), was held in Giants Stadium instead of in Italy because both clubs involved (Juventus and Milan) were touring the United States late in the summer, when the event is normally scheduled.

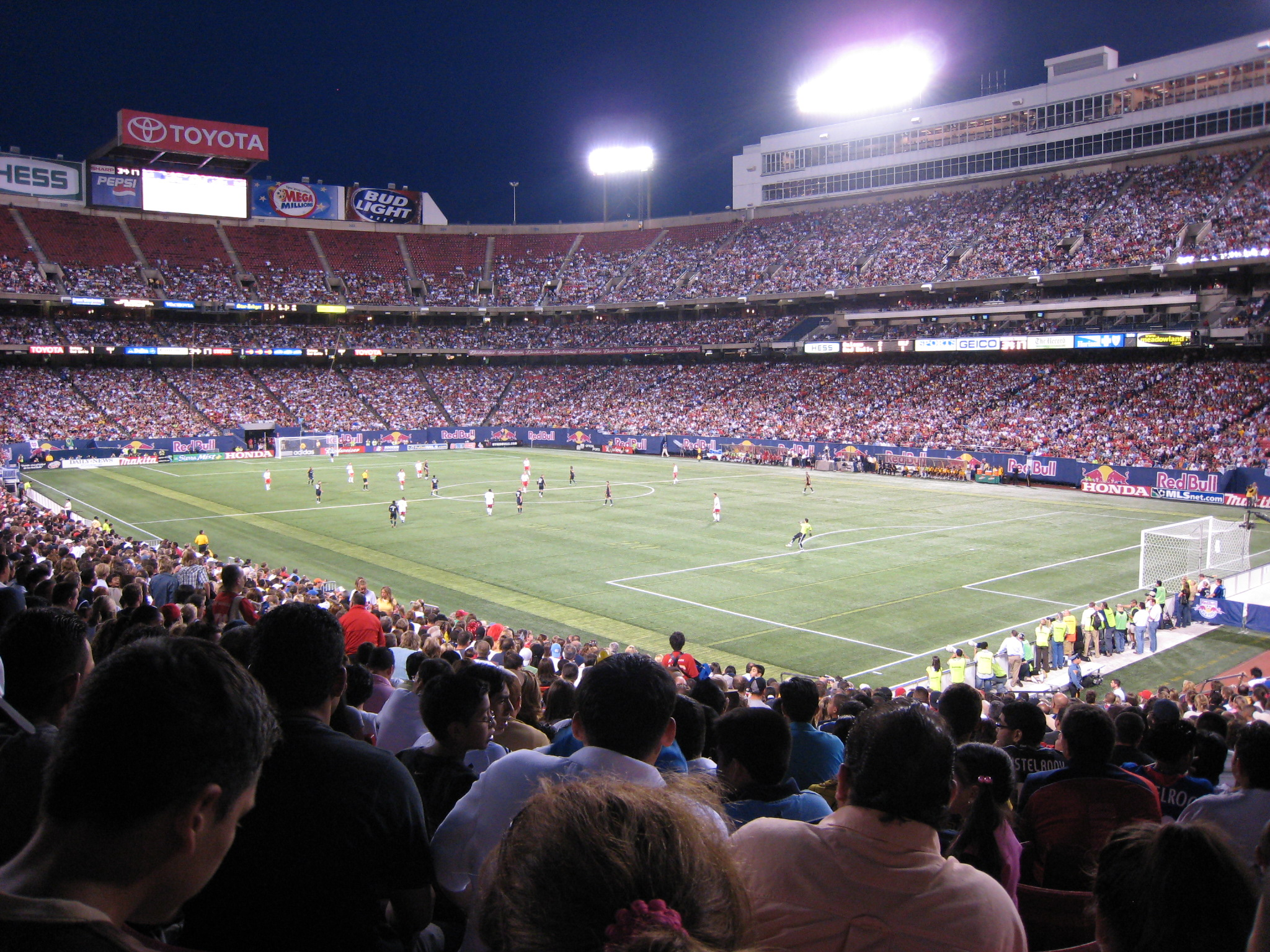
A New York Red Bulls match at Giants Stadium in 2007

In 2005, the stadium played host to several matches in the CONCACAF Gold Cup, including the final, which saw the USA defeat Panama, 3–1 in a penalty shootout after the sides played to a scoreless draw. In 2007, it hosted the Gold Cup again featuring four group stage matches. In, 2009 the stadium hosted the final for the CONCACAF Gold Cup for a second time which saw Mexico defeat the USA 5–0.

It saw many European soccer tours, hosting games involving such major soccer clubs as Manchester United, Celtic, Chelsea, Liverpool, Barcelona and Rangers.

It also hosted England's 3–2 victory over Colombia on May 31, 2005.

The New York Red Bulls (formerly the New York/New Jersey MetroStars) of Major League Soccer played at the stadium for their first 14 seasons. They moved to the soccer-specific Red Bull Arena in nearby Harrison in 2010.

=== 1994 FIFA World Cup matches ===
Date	Time (UTC−5)	Team #1	Res.	Team #2	Round	Attendance
1994-06-18	16:00	Italy	0–1	Ireland	Group E	75,338
1994-06-23	16:00	Italy	1–0	Norway	Group E	74,624
1994-06-25	19:30	Saudi Arabia	2–1	Morocco	Group F	76,322
1994-06-28	12:30	Ireland	0–0	Norway	Group E	72,404
1994-07-05	16:30	Mexico	1–1 (1–3 (p))	Bulgaria	Round of 16	71,030
1994-07-10	12:00	Bulgaria	2–1	Germany	Quarterfinal	72,000
1994-07-13	16:00	Bulgaria	1–2	Italy	Semifinal	74,110

=== 1999 FIFA Women's World Cup matches ===
Date	Time (UTC−5)	Team #1	Res.	Team #2	Round	Attendance
1999-06-19	15:00	Denmark	0–3	United States	Group A	78,972
1999-06-19	17:30	Brazil	7–1	Mexico	Group B	78,972
1999-06-26	12:00	Canada	1–4	Russia	Group C	29,401
1999-06-26	14:30	China	3–1	Australia	Group D	29,401

== Pope John Paul II at Giants Stadium ==
On October 5, 1995, Pope John Paul II celebrated Mass during a rainstorm, before a crowd of 82,948, the second-largest to ever attend an event at Giants Stadium. The record was broken on September 24, 2009, with an attendance of 84,472 at the U2 concert.

== Concerts ==
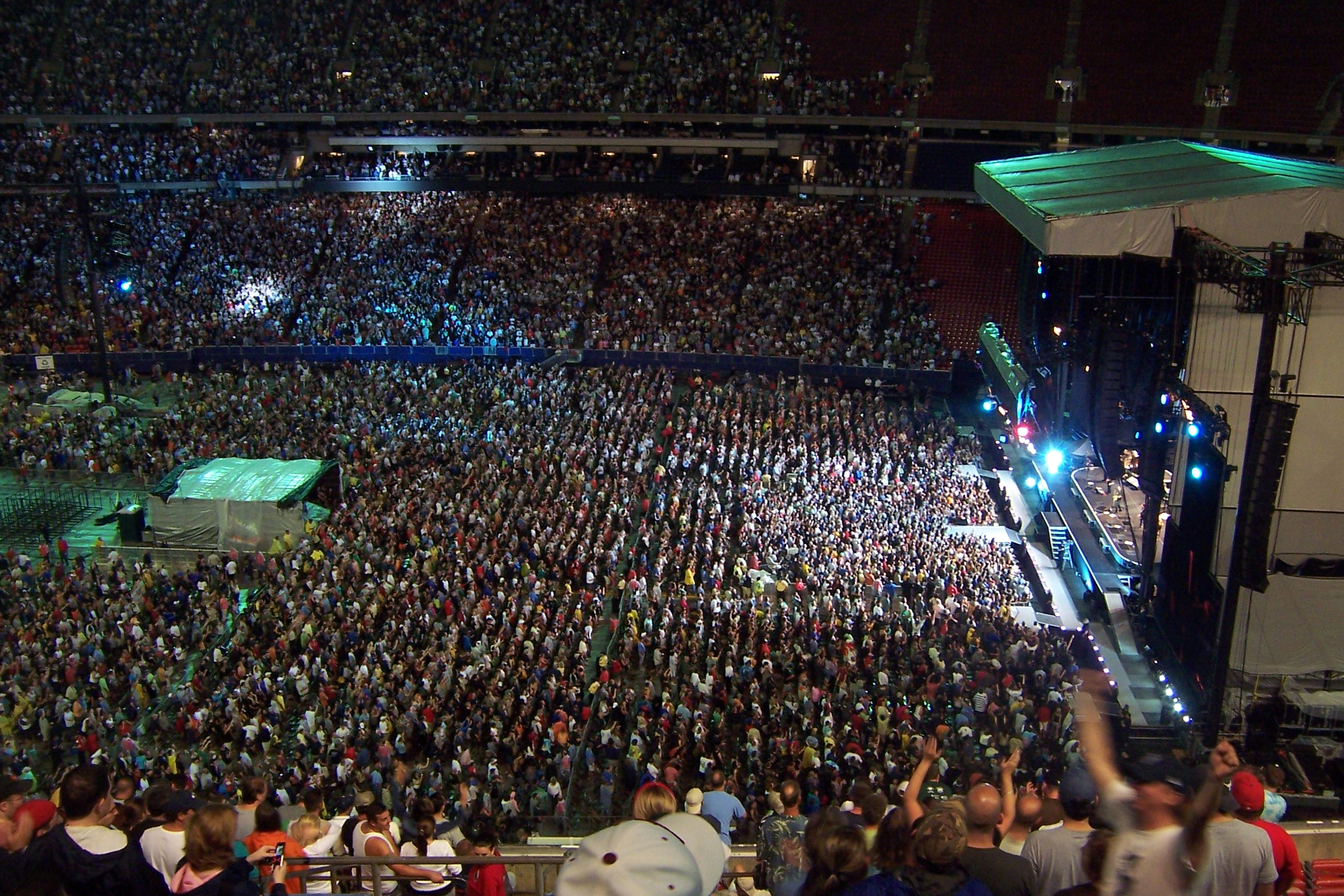
Bruce Springsteen & E Street Band performing at Giants Stadium, July 2008

The first concert at Giants Stadium occurred on June 25, 1978, with the Beach Boys as the headliners, with the Steve Miller Band, Pablo Cruise, and Stanky Brown also performing.

The Grateful Dead played Giants Stadium 14 times between 1978 and 1995. In 2019 the Grateful Dead released the Giants Stadium 1987, 1989, 1991 boxed set.

Pink Floyd performed two nights at the stadium on 3 and 4 June 1988 as part of their A Momentary Lapse of Reason tour, which concluded the North American leg of that tour before heading to Europe. They also performed two nights on 17 and 18 July 1994 as part of their The Division Bell tour. Interestingly, these two concerts were also the last two shows of the North American leg of that tour and the last Pink Floyd concerts ever held outside of Europe.

The stadium played host to Amnesty International's final A Conspiracy of Hope Benefit Concert on June 15, 1986. The show was a sold-out, all-day event, running from noon until 11 p.m. and broadcast on MTV. The show was headlined by U2 and Sting and also featured Bryan Adams, Peter Gabriel, Joan Baez, the Neville Brothers, and the Police. Additional artists that performed included John Eddie, with Max Weinberg; Third World; the Hooters; Peter, Paul and Mary; Steven van Zandt, with Bob Geldof, Stanley Jordan, Joan Armatrading, Jackson Browne, Rubén Blades, with Fela Kuti and Carlos Santana, Yoko Ono, Howard Jones, Miles Davis, and Joni Mitchell. Spoken introductions were made by Billy Graham, Bill Bradley, Daryl Hannah, Robert De Niro, Christopher Reeve, Michael J. Fox, and Muhammad Ali. Pete Townshend was scheduled to perform, but cancelled at the last minute, when his father, Cliff Townshend, became gravely ill, which would have been his first US solo appearance. This also marked the Police's final full-live performance together, until their 2007 Reunion Tour, 21 years later.

The stadium played host to the Tattoo the Earth Tour on July 20, 2000. The show featured performances by Slipknot, Slayer, Sevendust, Sepultura, Hed PE, Mudvayne, downset., Hatebreed, Full Devil Jacket, Famous, Amen, U.P.O., Nothingface, PPM, Cold, Relative Ash, Systematic, Six Feet Under, Candiria, Lamb of God, God Forbid, Darkest Hour, Unearth, All That Remains, Dropkick Murphys, Sick of It All, Tiger Army, Converge, The Unseen, Reach the Sky, Stretch Arm Strong, Kill Your Idols, and Nashville Pussy, including the only appearance by Metallica during the tour and also featured 42 tattoo artists from Australia, Austria, France, Germany, Malaysia, Manitoba, Spain, Switzerland, and the US.

The stadium has also played host to music festivals, including The Monsters of Rock Festival, Music at the Meadowlands, Ozzfest, and The Bamboozle (in the parking lot, annually, since 2003).

Dave Matthews Band played the stadium 10 times from 1998 to 2007, including three nights each in 2000 and 2001. On June 11, 2001 (the first of three nights), the band played the song "Two Step", where Dave Matthews sang the improvisational lyrics "let it rain", where then a thunderstorm broke out. This has been called "Two Step In The Rain" by fans, and can be heard on The Best of What's Around Vol. 1. When Matthews learned of the closing of Giants Stadium, he said, "I can't imagine I'll ever fall in love with a stadium like I did with Giants Stadium."

U2's concert on September 24, 2009, on their 360 Tour, broke the Pope's attendance record at Giants Stadium; the U2 crowd was in excess of 84,400.

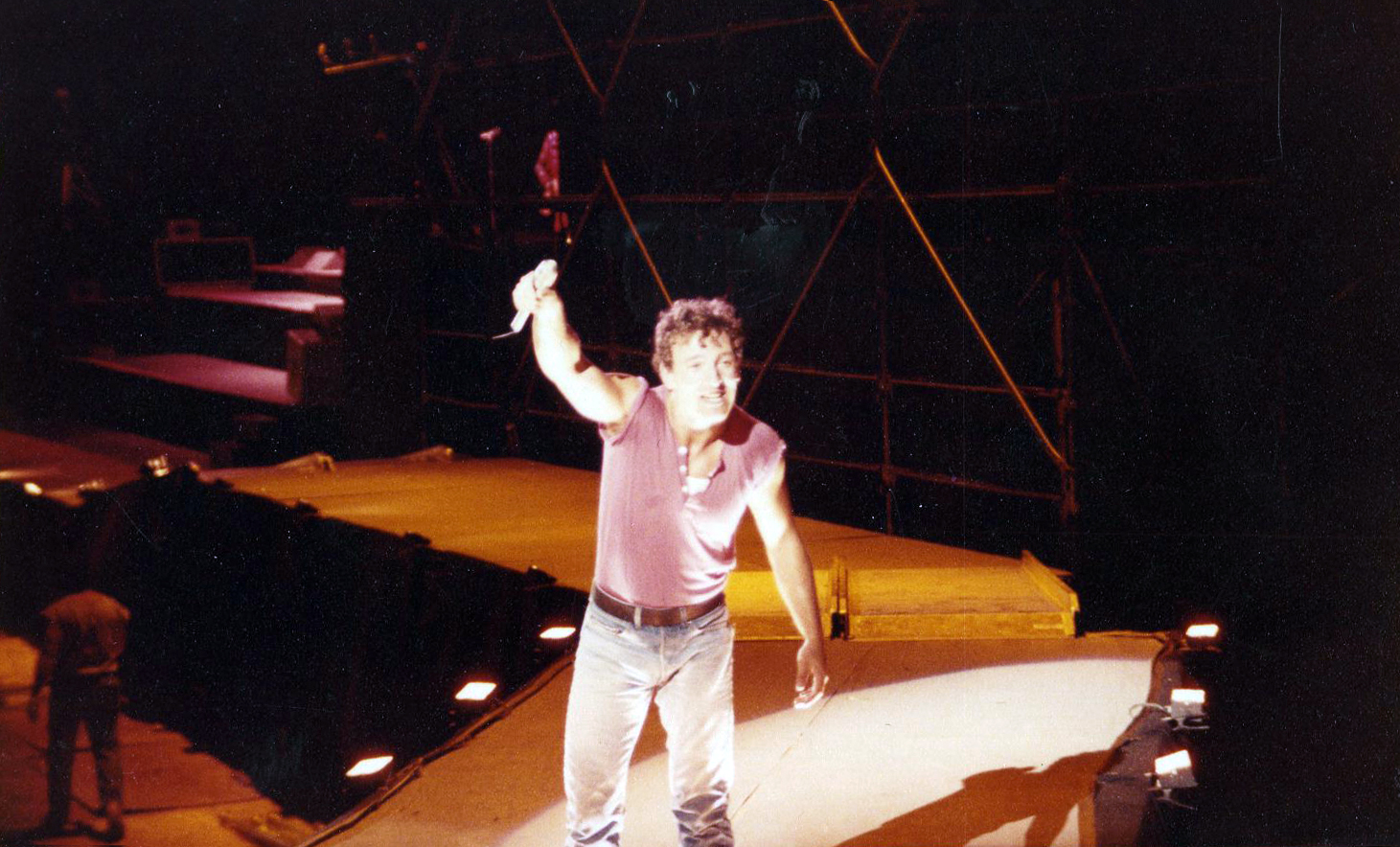
Bruce Springsteen at Giants Stadium, 1985

Many locals say it is the home turf of Bruce Springsteen and the E Street Band, due to the fact that they came from Freehold, New Jersey. They performed a total of 24 shows at the stadium from 1985 to 2009, with a record 10 shows during the Rising Tour in 2003. Several songs on his 1986 live album Live/1975–85 were recorded at shows at the stadium in August 1985. Springsteen wrote the song "Wrecking Ball" in response to the closing of the stadium and in 2009 performed it for the first time at the final five concerts at Giants Stadium. It would go on to be the title track of his next studio album, released over two years later.

== Seating capacity ==
The seating capacity over the years went as the following:

Years	Capacity
1976–1990	76,891
1991–1993	77,311
1994	77,121
1995–1998	78,148
1999–2001	79,469
2002–2010	80,242

== Changes and co-tenants ==
To accommodate these varied events, Giants Stadium sported various playing surfaces in its history. From its opening until the end of the 1999 NFL season, Giants Stadium sported an AstroTurf playing surface. This surface was covered by Bermuda grass sod for the World Cup in 1994, identical to that at the Rose Bowl where the other semifinal and the finals were held (so that both teams in the finals would have played on identical surfaces). The grass was removed after the World Cup, as it would have died in the New Jersey winter. The MetroStars installed a grass field with interchangeable trays each spring that was removed prior to football season, forcing the team to play the remainder of its season on the AstroTurf field used by the football teams. (When the New York Cosmos called Giants Stadium home, they played on the stadium's artificial surface and never used a grass field.)

The AstroTurf was replaced in 2000 by a system of interchangeable grass trays similar to those put in place for soccer, but was kept in place under the trays to aid in draining the field when it got wet. Over the next three years, the conditions would worsen as the season went on and the field quality was typically rated just as low as the old, hard AstroTurf had been. Giants Stadium finally scrapped the grass in favor of FieldTurf for the 2003 season, a surface that remained in place until the stadium closed.

The New York Jets left Shea Stadium and moved to Giants Stadium in 1984 after years of suffering under onerous lease terms imposed at the insistence of baseball's New York Mets. When they moved across the Hudson, many predicted the stadium would be renamed. While the Jets were attracted by the stadium's larger capacity (it held 15,000 more seats than Shea did in its football configuration), they were understandably displeased at the prospect of playing in a facility named after another team. However, under the terms of the stadium lease, changing the name of the stadium required the approval of the Giants, and they were unwilling to do so. As such, for years afterward the Jets referred to Giants Stadium as "The Meadowlands" whenever they played there.

Thanks largely to the dual occupancy of Giants Stadium by two NFL teams since 1984, it surpassed Wrigley Field (home of the Chicago Bears for 50 seasons) as the venue to have hosted more NFL games than any other in league history. The game played between the Jets and Miami Dolphins on September 14, 2003, was the 366th regular season NFL game at Giants Stadium breaking Wrigley's regular season record.

Since the stadium was originally built for the Giants, the stadium's lower walls were blue and the seats and the stadium's four gates were red and blue to reflect the team colors. When the Jets moved in, green banners were hung over the walls and eventually over the outer gates of the stadium anytime the team hosted a game. In addition, team-specific end zone decorations would be changed for Jets home games. This was accomplished by either painting over the Giants logos, or replacing the turf section of each end zone. Midfield decorations at the 50-yard line were typically not team-specific (in early years a Meadowlands logo, and later an NFL shield), which could be used for both teams' games.

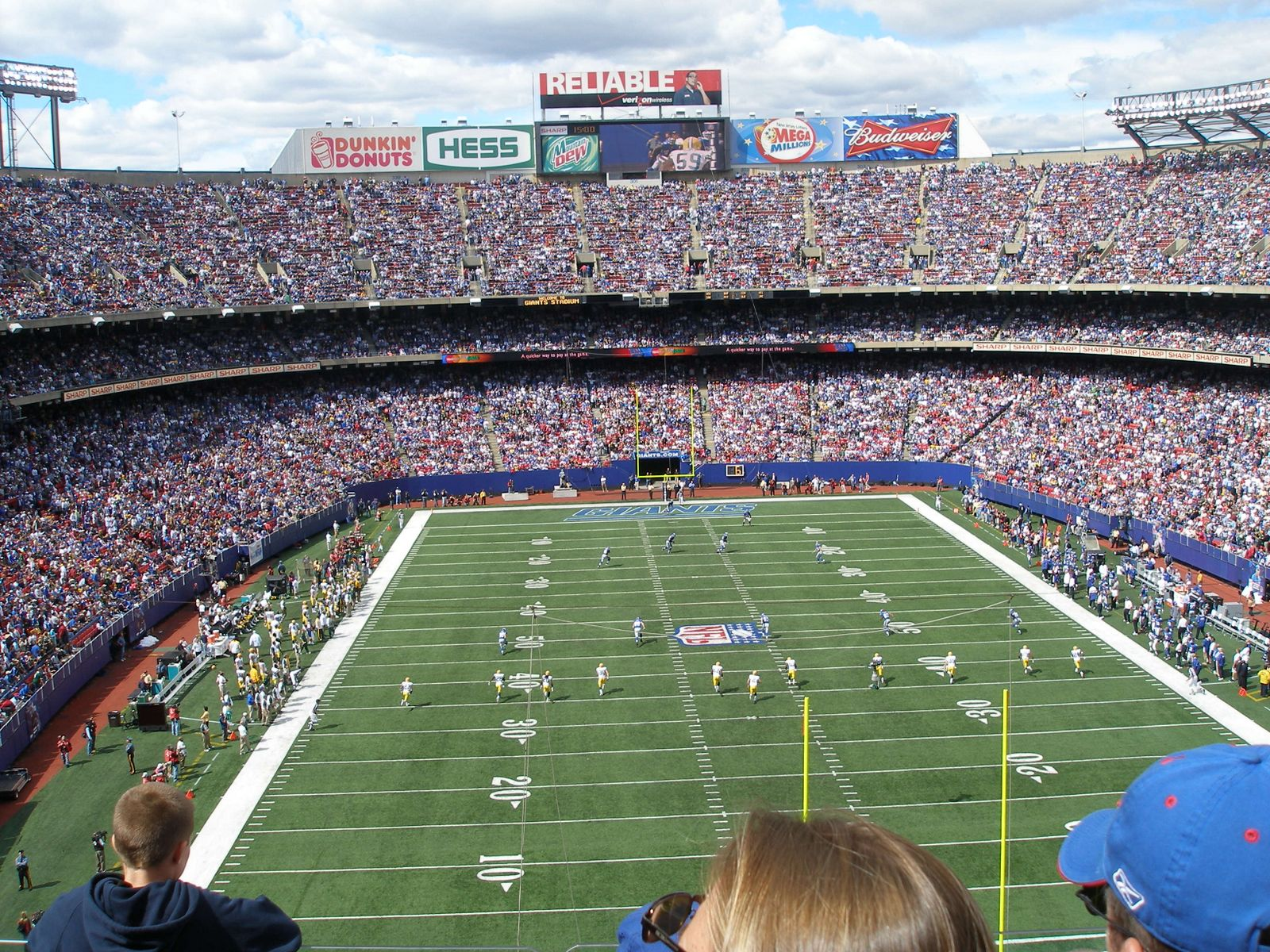
Giants Stadium in 2007, with the neutral NFL shield in clear view

In mid-December, traditionally the stadium hosted a Saturday-Sunday NFL doubleheader, with the Giants playing a home game one day and the Jets playing the other. The night between the games was a challenge for the stadium grounds crew, as they only had hours to convert the stadium from one team's colors to the other. As per the NFL schedule, the Giants and the Jets play each other once every four years. In that case, there was a predetermined home team, and a predetermined away team. In those games, the away team gets a rare away game in their own home stadium. The Giants and Jets typically play each other every year in the third week of the NFL Preseason, and the teams annually rotated the home and away teams.

== Replacement and demolition ==
As Giants Stadium approached 30 years of age, it was becoming one of the older stadiums in the NFL. The Jets, who were tenants to the Giants, were looking to have a proposed West Side Stadium built in Manhattan. Originally intended to be the 85,000-seat main stadium for New York's bid for the 2012 Summer Olympics, it was designed to be downsized to 75,000 seats for the Jets. However, it would have required significant public funding; progress on the project was halted in 2005 due to opposition from a number of sources, including Cablevision, who owned the nearby Madison Square Garden at the time.

The Giants then entered into a joint venture with the Jets to build a new stadium in which the two New York teams would be equal partners. The architects were tasked with designing a neutral stadium that would still embody the distinct personalities of both franchises. The Giants favored a traditional look of exposed steel framework and rusticated stone while the Jets wanted a sleek and modern look highlighted by metal and glass. With those features in mind the designers used the column/tower dynamic seen in many of Manhattan's skyscrapers as inspiration for the stadium's design.

Demolition work on Giants Stadium began at approximately 10:00 a.m. EST on February 4, 2010, at the Gate B spirals, the closest point to the new stadium. The demolition work was expected to cost more than $10 million and took approximately four months to complete. By May 10, 2010, approximately 50% of the Stadium had been demolished. On May 19, 2010, at 8:30 p.m., demolition crews pulled down the press box, the highest part of the stadium. In the early afternoon of June 28, 2010, the last section of stadium grandstand came down, leaving just two later demolished upper-level escalators standing.

Much of the stadium's memorabilia was sold to a sports memorabilia company, such as the framed pictures from the suites, all of the building's signage and a good portion of the saved bowl seats. Other property was liquidated to other NJSEA facilities such as the IZOD Center and Monmouth Park Racetrack.

=== Jimmy Hoffa urban legend ===
For some years, a popular urban legend purported that the remains of Jimmy Hoffa, whose disappearance coincided with construction of the stadium, had been buried under one of the end zones at the field. This led Sports Illustrated to suggest that this "takes on special meaning when a punter goes for the 'coffin corner.'" In a similar vein, sportscaster Marv Albert once said that a team was "kicking towards the Hoffa end of the field." The rumor was referenced in The Simpsons episode "Last Exit to Springfield", when the leader of the Springfield chapter of the "International Brotherhood of Jazz Dancers, Pastry Chefs and Nuclear Technicians" trade union is said to have mysteriously disappeared after promising to clean up the union; the body of the missing leader is then shown buried under a football field.

The rumor was tested by the Discovery Channel show MythBusters, and they were unable to find any sign of a body. Furthermore, no human remains were found during the demolition of the stadium in 2010.

== Notable moments ==
- October 10, 1976: The Giants played their first ever regular season game at Giants Stadium, a 24–14 loss to the Dallas Cowboys in front of 76,042 fans.

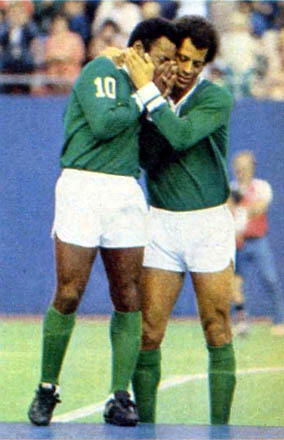
Pelé being consoled by teammate Carlos Alberto at the end of his farewell game v Brazilian side Santos, 1 October 1977

- October 1, 1977: Soccer legend Pelé played his last game, an exhibition match between the Cosmos and Santos. He played the first half for the Cosmos and the second half for his old Brazilian team.
- June 25, 1978: First concert at Giants Stadium, with The Beach Boys, The Steve Miller Band, Pablo Cruise, and Stanky Brown performing.
- October 28, 1978: Rutgers beat Columbia 69–0. The Lions' humiliating defeat was the last game in one of the oldest rivalries in college football. Columbia's young coach Bill Campbell retired from coaching after the game and went on to a vastly more successful career in the Silicon Valley.
- November 19, 1978: Giants quarterback Joe Pisarcik fumbled the handoff to Larry Csonka with just seconds remaining in the game, allowing Herman Edwards (later a Jets head coach) to scoop it up and run it back for a touchdown, giving the Philadelphia Eagles an improbable 19–17 win. This play would be known as "The Miracle at the Meadowlands", and helped lead to the hiring of George Young as general manager, and later Bill Parcells as head coach. Pisarcik's career in New York never recovered, and Phil Simms was drafted shortly after.
- September 6, 1984: The New York Jets moved into Giants Stadium, losing their first game to the Pittsburgh Steelers by a score of 23–17.
- July 29, 30 and 31, 1984: The Jacksons performed three sold-out shows during their Victory Tour with 136,000 total attendance.
- July 14, 1985: The Baltimore Stars defeated the Oakland Invaders, 28–24, in the 1985 USFL Championship Game, the final game in league history.
- August–September 1985: Bruce Springsteen and the E Street Band performed six sold-out shows on the final leg of their Born in the U.S.A. Tour.
- December 28–29, 1985: Giants Stadium made history by playing host to multiple playoff games in the same weekend. The Jets hosted the first playoff game in stadium history, as well as their first since hosting the Buffalo Bills in 1981 at Shea Stadium, on December 28, losing to the eventual AFC champion New England Patriots 26–14 in the AFC Wild Card Game. The next day the Giants, who were playing their first home playoff game since they lost the 1962 NFL Championship Game at Yankee Stadium, defeated the defending Super Bowl champion San Francisco 49ers 17–3 in the NFC Wild Card Game.
- September 22, 1986: In a dramatic game, the Jets defeated the Miami Dolphins 51–45 in overtime. Jets quarterback Ken O'Brien threw for 479 yards and 4 touchdowns while Dan Marino threw for 448 yards and 6 touchdowns. Jets receiver Wesley Walker caught 6 passes for 194 yards and 4 touchdowns.
- January 11, 1987: The New York Giants shut out the Washington Redskins 17–0 in the NFC Championship Game to advance to Super Bowl XXI in Pasadena. Two weeks later, the Giants won Super Bowl XXI, their first Super Bowl victory.
- November 8, 1987: The New York Giants defeated the New England Patriots 17–10 in ESPN's first televised regular season game.
- June 30, 1989: The Who sold out four consecutive shows performing portions of the rock opera Tommy to open the first of two sets each night.
- June–July 1994: Giants Stadium served as a venue for the 1994 FIFA World Cup, opening with Ireland's 1–0 win over Italy, and concluding with Italy's 2–1 win over Bulgaria in the semifinals.
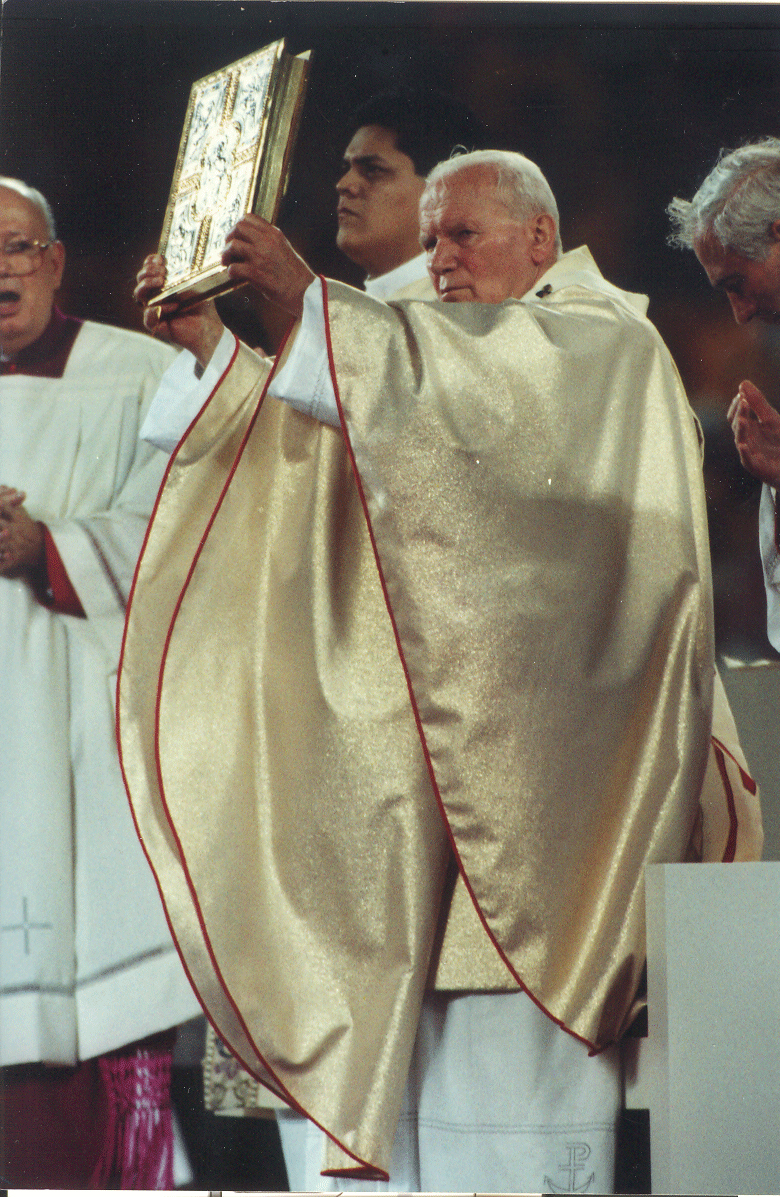
- Pope John Paul II celebrates Mass at Giants Stadium
  October 6, 1995: 83,000 people filled the stadium on a rainy Thursday night to participate in a Mass led by Pope John Paul II during a trip to the United States.
- December 23, 1995: Frustrated Giants fans pelt the field with snowballs during a late season loss to the San Diego Chargers. A Chargers equipment manager was knocked unconscious and some 175 spectators were ejected.
- December 13, 1998: The New York Giants defeated the then 13–0 Denver Broncos 20–16 in front of 72,336 spectators.
- October 23, 2000: In what has been called the greatest game on Monday Night Football, the New York Jets came back from a 30–7 deficit by scoring 30 points in the fourth quarter and another 3 in overtime to beat the Miami Dolphins 40–37. The game is known as the Monday Night Miracle.
- January 14, 2001: The New York Giants defeated the Minnesota Vikings 41–0 in the NFC Championship Game in front of 79,310 in attendance to send the Giants to Super Bowl XXXV in Tampa.
- December 29, 2002: The New York Jets defeated the Green Bay Packers 42–17 to clinch the AFC East Division Title after a last-minute New England Patriots rally to defeat the Miami Dolphins changed the Jets' fortunes. Had New England lost, the Jets would've been eliminated from playoff contention. New England scored 11 points in the final two minutes to tie and won the game in overtime. The stadium crowd erupted furiously when the news spread of the Patriots victory. This opened the door for a scintillating Jets rout.
- July–August 2003: Bruce Springsteen and the E Street Band broke their own record with 10 sold-out shows on the Rising Tour.
- December 20, 2003: The New England Patriots defeated the New York Jets 21–16 in ESPN's 200th NFL regular season game.

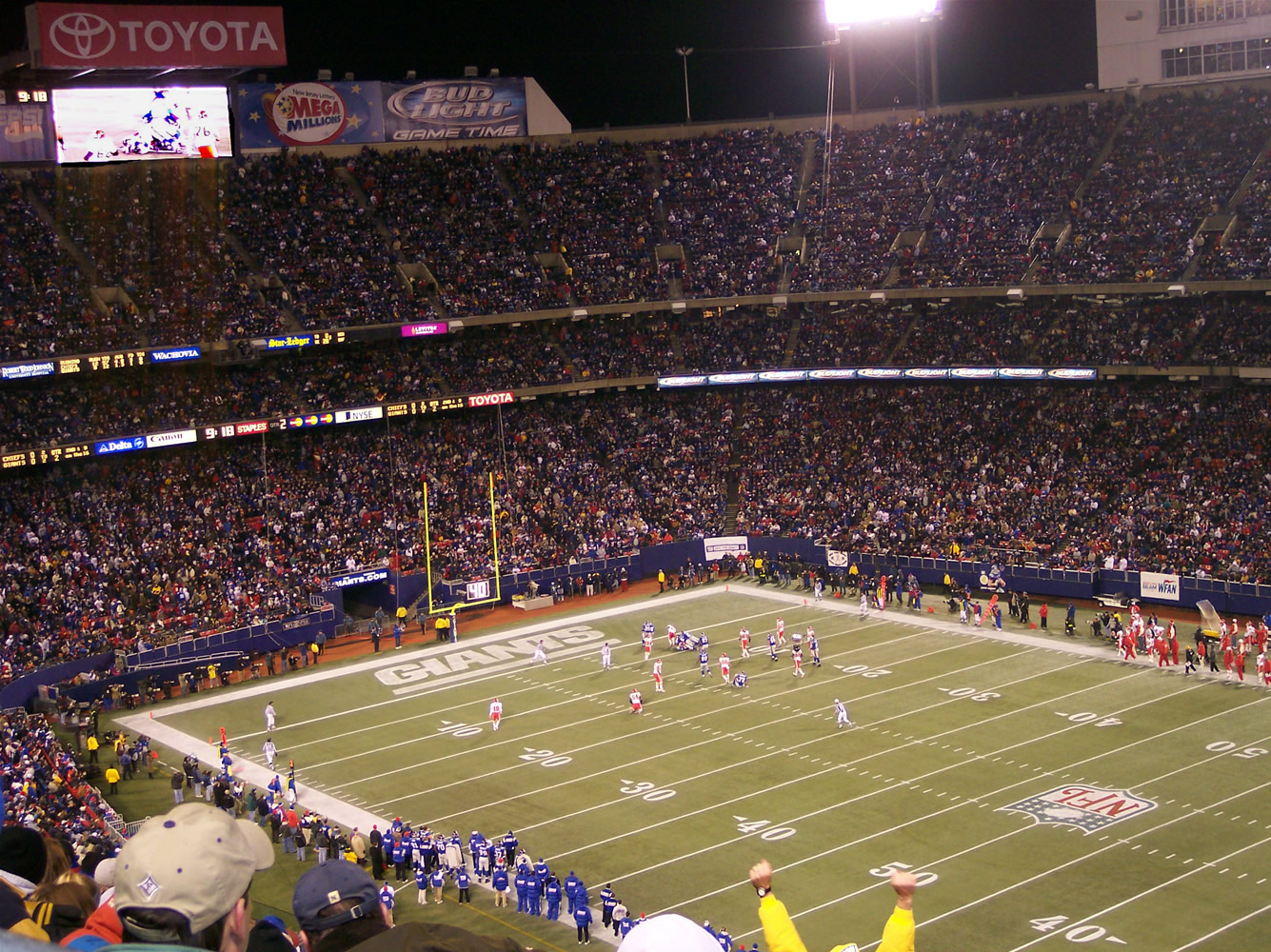
Giants Stadium during a December 17, 2005, game between the Giants and Kansas City Chiefs

- September 1, 2005: The punk rock band Green Day sold out Giants Stadium with Against Me! and Jimmy Eat World. It was their biggest concert played in North America.
- December 26, 2005: The New York Jets and the New England Patriots played each other in the last Monday Night Football game on ABC. The Patriots defeated the Jets 31–21.
- January 8, 2006: The Giants attracted their largest crowd in stadium history when they hosted the Carolina Panthers in the NFC Wild Card Game. 79,378 fans witnessed the Giants' 23–0 shutout loss to the Panthers.
- July 7, 2007: The "New York" portion of Live Earth, a worldwide series of concerts of pop and rock music featuring various bands and musical artists planned to inspire global warming activism, was held at Giants Stadium.
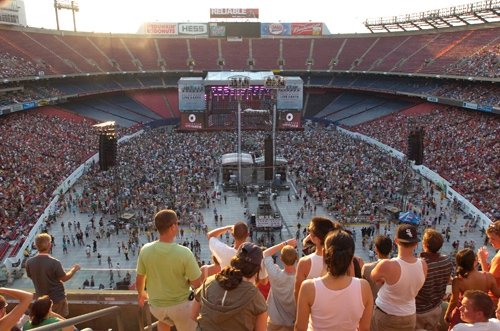
- Giants Stadium hosts Live Earth
  August 18, 2007: 66,237 attended as the largest crowd ever for a regular-season MLS match at Giants Stadium.
- September 9, 2007: New England Patriots cornerback Ellis Hobbs set an NFL record by taking the second-half kickoff 108 yards for a touchdown against the New York Jets in a 38–14 opening day victory. The play also tied the record for the longest play in NFL history at the time, matching the 108-yard missed field goal returns by the Chicago Bears' Devin Hester against the Giants in 2006, and the Bears' Nathan Vasher the previous season against the San Francisco 49ers.
- December 29, 2007: The New England Patriots closed out their undefeated 16–0 regular season at Giants Stadium with a 38–35 win over the New York Giants in front of a record regular season crowd on 79,110. In the fourth quarter, Patriots quarterback Tom Brady broke Peyton Manning's NFL record of 49 touchdown passes set in 2004, with his NFL record 50th touchdown pass, a 65-yard touchdown pass to wide receiver Randy Moss, who on the same play set the record for most touchdown receptions in a single season with 23, breaking the record held previously by Jerry Rice with 22 touchdown receptions set in 1987.
- June 8, 2008: The United States men's national soccer team played then world #1 Argentina to a scoreless draw in front of a crowd of 78,682.
- January 11, 2009: The stadium hosted what would ultimately be its final playoff game, the Giants' 2008–09 NFC Divisional Round matchup against the arch-rival Philadelphia Eagles. 79,193 fans watched the Giants lose to the Eagles, 23–11.
- July 26, 2009: In the 2009 CONCACAF Gold Cup final 79,156 fans witnessed Mexico beat the USA 5–0, Mexico's first win against the USA on American soil in a decade.
- September 23–24, 2009: U2 played two consecutive sold-out shows at Giants Stadium, their last two shows at the famous venue, as part of their U2 360 tour. On the second night of the performance, Bono announced that the attendance record has been broken. He also joked that "not even the pope had as many people there." The final attendance was 84,467.
- October 9, 2009: Bruce Springsteen and the E Street Band played in the final concert at Giants Stadium. The concert capped a five-night stand of performances in September and October, highlighting Springsteen's classic albums Born to Run, Darkness on the Edge of Town, and Born in the U.S.A., as well as debuting a new song in honor of New Jersey and Giants Stadium, "Wrecking Ball."
- October 24, 2009: The final soccer game at Giants Stadium was played between the New York Red Bulls and Toronto FC, with New York winning 5–0.
- December 27, 2009: The Giants played their final home game in the stadium against the Carolina Panthers. The Giants lost to Carolina by a score of 41–9; this loss, combined with wins by Dallas and Green Bay that week, eliminated the Giants from playoff contention.
- January 3, 2010: The Jets defeated the Cincinnati Bengals 37–0 in the final game at Giants Stadium. The victory allowed the Jets to clinch a wild card berth as the fifth seed.

== In popular culture ==
Giants Stadium is featured in the 2008 film, The Day the Earth Stood Still, where it is destroyed by nanites.

Preceded by Shea Stadium	Home of the New York Giants; 1976–2009	Succeeded by MetLife Stadium
Preceded by Shea Stadium	Home of the New York Jets; 1984–2010	Succeeded by MetLife Stadium
Preceded by Yankee Stadium	Home of the New York Cosmos; 1977–1985	Succeeded by last stadium
Preceded by first stadium	Home of the New York Red Bulls; 1996–2009	Succeeded by Red Bull Arena
Preceded by Louisiana Superdome	Home of the New Orleans Saints (with Alamodome & Tiger Stadium); 2005 (One Game)	Succeeded by Louisiana Superdome
Preceded by Estadio Azteca; Mexico City	CONCACAF Gold Cup; Final Venue; 2005	Succeeded by Soldier Field; Chicago
Preceded by Soldier Field; Chicago	CONCACAF Gold Cup; Final Venue; 2009	Succeeded by Rose Bowl; Pasadena
Preceded by Soldier Field; Edward Jones Dome	Host of NFC Championship Game; 1987; 2001	Succeeded by RFK Stadium; Edward Jones Dome
Preceded by Tampa Stadium	Host of the United States Football League championship game 1985	Succeeded by None
