= List of 2002 box office number-one films in Canada =

This is a list of films which have placed number one at the weekend box office in Canada during 2002.

== Weekend gross list ==
| † | This implies the highest-grossing movie of the year. |

| # | Weekend End Date | Film | Weekend Gross (millions) | Notes |
|---|---|---|---|---|
| 1 | January 6, 2002 | The Lord of the Rings: The Fellowship of the Ring | $3.65 | |
| 2 | January 13, 2002 | The Lord of the Rings: The Fellowship of the Ring | $1.29 | |
| 3 | January 20, 2002 | Black Hawk Down | $5.67 | |
| 4 | January 27, 2002 | Black Hawk Down | $2.29 | |
| 5 | February 3, 2002 | Black Hawk Down | $2.15 | |
| 6 | February 10, 2002 | Collateral Damage | $2.41 | |
| 7 | February 17, 2002 | Collateral Damage | $1.90 | John Q was #1 in North America |
| 8 | February 24, 2002 | Queen of the Damned | $3.52 | |
| 9 | March 3, 2002 | We Were Soldiers | $4.53 | |
| 10 | March 10, 2002 | The Time Machine | $3.28 | |
| 11 | March 17, 2002 | Ice Age | $5.63 | |
| 12 | March 24, 2002 | Blade II | $3.92 | |
| 13 | March 31, 2002 | Panic Room | $3.93 | |
| 14 | April 7, 2002 | Panic Room | $2.96 | |
| 15 | April 14, 2002 | Panic Room | $2.53 | Changing Lanes was #1 in North America |
| 16 | April 21, 2002 | The Scorpion King | $4.93 | |
| 17 | April 28, 2002 | The Scorpion King | $3.52 | |
| 18 | May 5, 2002 | Spider-Man † | $11.89 | Spider-Man had the highest weekend debut of 2002. |
| 19 | May 12, 2002 | Spider-Man † | $7.39 | |
| 20 | May 19, 2002 | Star Wars: Episode II – Attack of the Clones | $8.43 | |
| 21 | May 26, 2002 | Star Wars: Episode II – Attack of the Clones | $6.57 | |
| 22 | June 2, 2002 | The Sum of All Fears | $3.42 | |
| 23 | June 9, 2002 | The Sum of All Fears | $3.51 | |
| 24 | June 16, 2002 | Scooby-Doo | $3.40 | |
| 25 | June 23, 2002 | Minority Report | $4.16 | |
| 26 | June 30, 2002 | Minority Report | $3.97 | Mr. Deeds was #1 in North America |
| 27 | July 7, 2002 | Men in Black II | $3.47 | |
| 28 | July 14, 2002 | Men in Black II | $1.93 | |
| 29 | July 21, 2002 | Stuart Little 2 | $1.31 | Road to Perdition was #1 in North America |
| 30 | July 28, 2002 | Austin Powers in Goldmember | $6.72 | |
| 31 | August 4, 2002 | Signs | $4.04 | |
| 32 | August 11, 2002 | xXx | $3.97 | |
| 33 | August 18, 2002 | xXx | $2.10 | |
| 34 | August 25, 2002 | xXx | $1.32 | Signs was #1 in North America |
| 35 | September 1, 2002 | My Big Fat Greek Wedding | $1.91 | Signs was #1 in North America |
| 36 | September 8, 2002 | My Big Fat Greek Wedding | $1.35 | Swimfan was #1 in North America |
| 37 | September 15, 2002 | My Big Fat Greek Wedding | $1.55 | Barbershop was #1 in North America |
| 38 | September 22, 2002 | My Big Fat Greek Wedding | $1.49 | Barbershop was #1 in North America |
| 39 | September 29, 2002 | Sweet Home Alabama | $2.09 | |
| 40 | October 6, 2002 | Red Dragon | $3.34 | |
| 41 | October 13, 2002 | Red Dragon | $1.85 | |
| 42 | October 20, 2002 | The Ring | $1.39 | |
| 43 | October 27, 2002 | The Ring | $1.69 | Jackass: The Movie was #1 in North America |
| 44 | November 3, 2002 | The Santa Clause 2 | $1.73 | |
| 45 | November 10, 2002 | 8 Mile | $4.79 | |
| 46 | November 17, 2002 | Harry Potter and the Chamber of Secrets | $8.75 | |
| 47 | November 24, 2002 | Harry Potter and the Chamber of Secrets | $5.30 | Die Another Day was #1 in North America |
| 48 | December 1, 2002 | Die Another Day | $2.89 | Die Another Day reached #1 in its second weekend of release. Harry Potter and the Chamber of Secrets was #1 in North America |
| 49 | December 8, 2002 | Die Another Day | $1.71 | |
| 50 | December 15, 2002 | Star Trek: Nemesis | $2.21 | Maid in Manhattan was #1 in North America |
| 51 | December 22, 2002 | The Lord of the Rings: The Two Towers | $7.59 | |
| 52 | December 29, 2002 | The Lord of the Rings: The Two Towers | $6.41 | |

== See also ==
- List of Canadian films
