= Chris Weber =

American guitarist

- Born: October 16, 1966 (age 59); Los Angeles, California, U.S.
- Genres: Hard rock; heavy metal; post-grunge
- Occupation: Musician
- Instrument: Guitar
- Years active: 1983–present
- Labels: Epic; DRT Entertainment; Cleopatra
- Formerly of: Hollywood Rose, U.P.O.

Christopher Garrison Weber (born October 16, 1966) is an American musician best known as the guitarist and founder of the groups U.P.O. and Hollywood Rose (which featured future Guns N' Roses members Axl Rose, Slash, Izzy Stradlin, and Steven Adler). With U.P.O., he released two albums, No Pleasantries (2000) and The Heavy (2004), while the Hollywood Rose demos, recorded in 1984, were released in 2004 titled The Roots of Guns N' Roses.

== Career ==
=== Hollywood Rose (1983–1984) ===
Prior to forming, Chris Weber was introduced to Lafayette native Izzy Stradlin, in the parking lot of the Rainbow Bar and Grill, by friend Tracii Guns, who was leading the first incarnation of L.A. Guns at this time, after Weber expressed an interest in forming a band. Soon afterwards, Weber and Stradlin started writing material and, at the suggestion of Stradlin, recruited his childhood friend, former Rapidfire and L.A. Guns singer William Bailey. At the suggestion of Bailey, the group called themselves AXL They played their first gig at The Orphanage in North Hollywood and played a few more shows before changing their name to Rose, with Bailey changing his name to W. Axl Rose. The group soon changed their name, for the final time, to Hollywood Rose when Weber discovered that the name Rose was already being used by a New York band.

After borrowing money from Weber's father, the group recorded a five-song demo in Hollywood in 1984. After playing a number of more shows, Rose fired Weber from the band with former Road Crew guitarist Slash joining the group. They would disband soon after.

The group reunited, briefly, with Rose, Stradlin, Weber and Darrow returning along while L.A. Guns drummer Rob Gardner also joined the group. Weber, who left to move to New York City, was soon replaced by Tracii Guns.

Guns N' Roses credited Weber as co-writer on the song "Anything Goes" off their record-breaking debut LP Appetite for Destruction in 1987; and "Reckless Life" and "Move To The City" re-released on 1988's top-5 GN'R Lies. Weber also co-wrote "Ain't Going Down" from Guns N' Roses Pinball and "New Work Tune" and "The Plague" from the Appetite for Destruction deluxe edition. Weber claimed to have co-written "Shadow of Your Love" (appears as a b-side on various releases, released as a single in 2018) and "Back Off Bitch" (from Use Your Illusion I), suing the band over songwriting credits, although the case was settled and Weber did not receive songwriting credits.

=== U.P.O. (1997–2004) ===
After meeting in the mid '90s, at the Reading Festival in England, Weber and singer Shawn Albro began working on material that eventually gained some major label interest. They recruited bassist Ben Shirley and drummer Tommy Holt, forming U.P.O., and going on to sign a record deal with Epic Records. They released their debut album, titled No Pleasantries, in 2000, produced by Rick Parashar, with the album peaking at number 19 on the Billboard Heatseekers Chart while the singles "Godless" and "Feel Alive" peaked at number 6 and 25 on the Mainstream Rock Chart respectively. "Feel Alive" appeared on the soundtrack to the film Book of Shadows: Blair Witch 2 while the group toured with the likes of Slipknot, Slayer, Mudvayne and Sepultura as part of the Tattoo The Earth tour with the song "Dust" being included on the live album Tattoo The Earth: The First Crusade. After further touring in support of the album, the group went on hiatus with Albro auditioning for "The Project" (later known as Velvet Revolver) during this time.

The group returned in 2004, recording and releasing The Heavy, working again with producer Rick Parashar, the same year through DRT Entertainment/Nitrus Records. The group toured in support of the album, however, after an October concert later that year, however, Weber suffered a seizure before being rushed to a hospital. It was soon revealed that he had a meningioma brain tumor for which Weber underwent successful surgery on November 17, 2004. The group seemed to go on hiatus soon afterwards with bassist Zoltan Bathory, who had replaced Ben Shirley, going on to form Five Finger Death Punch.

== Discography ==
Title	Release	Label	Band
No Pleasantries	2000	Epic	U.P.O.
The Heavy	2004	DRT Entertainment/Nitrus	U.P.O.
The Roots of Guns N' Roses	2004	Cleopatra	Hollywood Rose

=== Guest credits ===
Title	Release	Label	Band	Credits
Dopesnake	2007	Deadline	Hollywood Roses	Guitars on "Come Down"
