= Deny (song) =

Single by Default

from the album The Fallout
- B-side: "Let You Down"; "Wasting My Time"
- Released: 2001 (Canada); April 8, 2002 (international)
- Genre: Post-grunge; hard rock
- Length: 3:55
- Label: TVT
- Songwriters: Dallas Smith; Jeremy Hora; Dave Benedict; Danny Craig; Chad Kroeger
- Producers: Chad Kroeger; Rick Parashar

Default singles chronology
"Wasting My Time" (2001)	"Deny" (2001)	"Live a Lie" (2002)

Music video
- "Deny" on YouTube

"Deny" is a song by Canadian rock band Default from their 2001 debut studio album, The Fallout. It was co-written by the members of the band and Chad Kroeger, who also co-produced the track with Rick Parashar. "Deny" originally began to receive airplay from CFOX-FM in 2001. The song was released internationally on April 8, 2002. The song was featured on the EA Sports video game, NHL 2003, and was supported by a music video featuring boxer Laila Ali.

Failing to enter the Billboard Hot 100, the song proved unable to replicate its predecessor's multi-format success. "Deny" was still a hit at rock radio, reaching number seven on the US Mainstream Rock chart and number one on the Canada rock airplay chart.

== Music video ==
A music video was produced for "Deny" which stars professional boxer Laila Ali, daughter of Muhammad Ali, in a boxing contest. Default performs and represents Ali's motivation. As the song plays through, band members receive facial injuries in relation to the punches endured by Ali. This corresponds with the song's lyrics which deal with the demise of a relationship taking a metaphorically physical toll on a partner. Guitarist Jeremy Hora explained in an interview with LAUNCH:

"We're actually inside [Laila Ali's] head. We're her motivation. We're supposed to be the music in the background, whatever, like, the song's supposed to represent how the match is going. And so, when she gets hit, we also get hit at the same time."

Due to Default's touring schedule, the band shot their scenes separately from Ali and consequently were not able to meet her.

== Track listings ==
CD single
No.	Title	Writer(s)	Length
1.	"Deny"	Dallas Smith; Jeremy Hora; Dave Benedict; Danny Craig; Chad Kroeger	3:50
2.	"Let You Down"	Smith; Hora; Benedict; Craig	3:29
3.	"Wasting My Time"	Smith; Hora; Benedict; Craig	4:29
Total length:			11:48

Australia CD single
No.	Title	Writer(s)	Length
1.	"Deny" (radio edit)	Smith; Hora; Benedict; Craig; Kroeger
2.	"Wasting My Time"	Smith; Hora; Benedict; Craig
3.	"Deny" (Rick Parashar mix)	Smith; Hora; Benedict; Craig
4.	"Deny" (video)

== Charts ==
Chart (2002)	Peak position
Australia (ARIA Charts)	99
Canada (BDS)	36
Canada Rock Airplay (Nielsen SoundScan)	1
Quebec Airplay (ADISQ)	48
UK Rock & Metal (OCC)	27
US Mainstream Rock (Billboard)	7
US Modern Rock Tracks (Billboard)	14
