= Mercury (Longview album) =

2003 studio album by Longview

Studio album by Longview
- Released: 21 July 2003
- Studio: London Bridge Studio, Seattle
- Genre: Indie rock; post-Britpop
- Length: 52:48
- Label: 14th Floor Records
- Producer: Rick Parashar

Singles from Mercury
- 1. "Further" Released: 24 June 2002; 2. "When You Sleep" Released: 14 October 2002; 3. "Nowhere" Released: 27 January 2003; 4. "Falling for You" Released: 12 May 2003; 5. "Electricity" Released: 2 June 2003; 6. "Further" Released: 7 July 2003 (reissue); 7. "Can't Explain" Released: 29 September 2003; 8. "Still" Released: 19 January 2004; 9. "In a Dream" Released: 28 June 2004; 10. "Coming Down"/"When You Sleep" Released: 10 January 2005; 11. "Falling for You" Released: 4 April 2005 (reissue); 12. "Further" Released: 8 August 2005 (third reissue)

Professional ratings
Review scores
Source	Rating
AllMusic	link
The Big Issue	5/5 stars
Evening Standard	3/3 stars
FHM	4/5 stars
The Guardian	(Positive)
Heat	4/5 stars
Manchester Online	(4/5) link
Q	3/5 stars
Metro	3/5 stars
Rock Sound	9/10 stars
Time Out	(Positive)
The Times	4/5 stars
Total Guitar	5/5 stars
Uncut	4/5 stars

Mercury is the first full-length and currently the only studio album by the British indie rock band Longview. It was first released in the United Kingdom on 21 July 2003 by 14th Floor Records, and in the United States on 15 March 2005 by Columbia Records. "Further", "When You Sleep" and "Nowhere" were issued as singles by their first independent label 4:45 Recordings; "Further" and "When You Sleep" were subsequently reissued alongside other songs from the album as singles when the band signed with 14th Floor Records. A collection of remixes entitled Subversions, featuring remixes by Jacknife Lee, Elbow, Mogwai, Andy Votel and Ulrich Schnauss, was released in 2004 and included as a bonus disc with a reissue of the album on 31 January 2005.

== Track listing ==
All tracks are written by Rob McVey.

Original UK release
No.	Title	Length
1.	"Further"	5:01
2.	"Can't Explain"	5:02
3.	"Electricity"	3:33
4.	"When You Sleep"	3:42
5.	"If You Asked"	4:37
6.	"I Would"	5:27
7.	"Nowhere"	3:50
8.	"Falling For You"	4:07
9.	"Falling Without You"	3:57
10.	"Still"	4:08
11.	"Will You Wait Here"	6:08
12.	"This Is"	3:27

All tracks are written by Rob McVey, except "In A Dream" by Aidan Banks.

US edition
No.	Title	Length
1.	"Further"	5:01
2.	"Can't Explain"	5:02
3.	"Falling For You"	4:07
4.	"In A Dream"	3:48
5.	"Nowhere"	3:50
6.	"I Would"	5:27
7.	"Electricity"	3:33
8.	"Still"	4:08
9.	"One More Try"	3:42
10.	"When You Sleep"	3:42
11.	"If You Asked"	4:37
12.	"Will You Wait Here"	6:08

Bonus tracks
No.	Title	Length
13.	"Further" (New Radio Mix)	4:00
14.	"Falling Without You" (2005 Version)	3:57

== Personnel ==
Credits adapted from liner notes.

Longview

- Rob McVey - guitar, vocals
- Doug Morch - guitar, backing vocals
- Aidan Banks - bass, backing vocals
- Matt Dabbs - drums

Additional musicians and production

- Rick Parashar - producer, engineer
- Brian Rose - original producer (1)
- Sharon Hart - backing vocals (1)
- Sarah Shawcross - vocal arrangement (1 4, 5, 8), backing vocals (1, 5, 8)
- Paul Buckmaster - string arrangement (1, 6, 9 to 12), string conducting (1, 6, 9 to 12)
- Simon James - concertmaster (1, 6, 9 to 12)
- Dave Burnham - original engineering (1)
- Christian Mock - additional engineering
- Geoff Ott - additional engineering
- Honchol Sin - recording assistance
- Reed Ruddy - string engineering
- Sam Hofstedt - string engineering assistance
- Chris Lord-Alge - mixing
- Jack Joseph Puig - mixing
- David Thoener - mixing
- Ted Jensen - mastering
- Free Barrabas! - design
- Mary Scanlon - photography
