= The Fallout (Default album) =

Studio album by Default
- Released: October 2, 2001
- Recorded: 2001
- Genre: Post-grunge
- Length: 37:17
- Label: TVT
- Producers: Rick Parashar; Chad Kroeger

Default chronology
The Fallout (2001)	Elocation (2003)

Singles from The Fallout
- 1. "Wasting My Time" Released: August 28, 2001; 2. "Deny" Released: April 8, 2002; 3. "Live a Lie" Released: 2002; 4. "Sick and Tired" Released: 2002

The Fallout is the debut studio album by Canadian hard rock band Default, released on October 2, 2001. Chad Kroeger, the frontman of Nickelback, contributed to the album's production and co-wrote six of its songs including its second single. With two hit singles, The Fallout is widely considered Default's best work and was their biggest commercial success, gaining platinum certification in the United States.

The song "Wasting My Time" received much airplay throughout 2001 and 2002. The second single, "Deny", was featured on the soundtrack of the popular NHL 2003 game by EA Sports and also received a great deal of air time, helping launch Default into the mainstream of Canadian rock.

A special edition of this CD, alongside a DVD, included the bonus track "Blind" and acoustic versions of the lead singles "Deny" and "Wasting My Time". An acoustic version of the final track, "Let You Down", also served as the final track to Default's sophomore effort, Elocation.

== Critical reception ==
Professional ratings
Review scores
Source	Rating
AllMusic	2.5/5 stars
Entertainment Weekly	C
PopMatters	(positive)

The Fallout received mixed reviews from music critics who were skeptical of the band's musicianship being similar to other bands of its given genre. Stephanie Dickison of PopMatters gave praise to the album's professional yet naturally sounding production and Dallas Smith's performance for giving off the right amount of energy in his notes despite being a bit jovial at times, but felt the band would face problems being similar to 3 Doors Down, Lifehouse and Nickelback, saying that "For a debut, it is excellent. But up against the other heavy-guitar, heartily vocalized bands like the aforementioned, they have their work cut out for them." Andy Hinds of AllMusic highlighted the first three tracks as standouts but found the album overall to be devoid of originality in its borrowing of grunge music, saying it "provides a non-threatening option for those who seek the stylistic affectations of grunge rock, but wish to avoid all of the substance or excitement of its first generation." David Browne, writing for Entertainment Weekly, noticed a slight difference between this and Puddle of Mudd's Come Clean apart from taking elements of grunge into their respective albums: "Default's debut, The Fallout, is more up-tempo and burly, yet they still manage to use the word never 32 times in one cut ("Slow Me Down"). The song titles – "Sick and Tired," "Wasting My Time," "Live a Lie" – say it all."

== Tour and reissue ==
On June 8, 2026, 604 Records announced that Default will celebrate their debut album with a 25th anniversary tour, starting on September 21 at The Bowes in Grande Prairie, Alberta, and finishing on November 28 at the London Music Hall. Wide Mouth Mason and Limblifter were supporting acts on select dates of the tour. They also announced a special anniversary CD and vinyl reissue of the album.

== Track listing ==
All music is composed by Default, except where noted.

No.	Title	Lyrics	Music	Length
1.	"Sick & Tired"	Dallas Smith; Chad Kroeger		2:59
2.	"Deny"	Jeremy James Hora; Kroeger	Default; Kroeger	3:57
3.	"Wasting My Time"	Hora; Smith		4:29
4.	"Slow Me Down"	Hora; Kroeger	Default; Kroeger	3:23
5.	"One Late Night"	Hora; Kroeger		3:11
6.	"Seize the Day"	Hora; Kroeger		2:44
7.	"Somewhere"	Smith		3:20
8.	"Live a Lie"	Smith	Default; Rick Parashar	3:40
9.	"By Your Side"	Hora; Smith		2:46
10.	"Faded"	Hora; Kroeger		3:24
11.	"Let You Down"	Hora		3:29
Total length:				37:17

Limited edition bonus tracks
No.	Title	Lyrics	Music	Length
12.	"Blind"	Hora; Kroeger		3:03
13.	"Deny" (acoustic)	Hora; Kroeger	Default; Kroeger	3:46
14.	"Wasting My Time" (acoustic)	Hora; Smith		4:22

Original pressing
No.	Title	Lyrics	Music	Length
1.	"Slow Me Down"	Hora; Kroeger	Default; Kroeger	3:24
2.	"Deny"	Hora; Kroeger	Default; Kroeger	3:53
3.	"One Late Night"	Hora; Kroeger		3:10
4.	"Seize the Day"	Hora; Kroeger		2:42
5.	"Somewhere"	Smith		3:19
6.	"By Your Side"	Hora; Smith		2:44
7.	"Let You Down"	Hora		3:25
8.	"Faded"	Hora; Kroeger		3:22
9.	"Circles"	Hora		3:24
10.	"Blind"	Hora; Kroeger		3:03

== Personnel ==
Default

- Dallas Smith – lead vocals
- Jeremy James Hora – guitar, backing vocals
- Dave Benedict – bass guitar
- Danny Craig – drums

Additional musicians

- Rick Parashar – piano (track 8)

Artwork

- Benjamin Wheelock – album design
- Blake Little – Photography

Production

- Rick Parashar – producer, engineer, and mixing (tracks 1, 3, 8)
- Kip Beelman – engineer and Pro-Tools engineer (tracks 1, 3, 8)
- Kelly Gray – mixing (tracks 1, 3, 8)
- Chad Kroeger – producer (tracks 2, 4–7, 9–12)
- Joey Moi – engineer and mixing (tracks 2, 4–7, 9–14)
- Jamie Stirr – 2nd engineer (tracks 2, 4–7, 9–12)
- Joe Spivak – 2nd engineer and digital engineer (tracks 2, 4–7, 9–12)
- George Marino – mastering
- Leonard B. Johnson – A&R

== Charts ==
=== Weekly charts ===
Weekly chart performance
Chart (2002)	Peak position
Australian Albums (ARIA)	85
Canadian Albums (Nielsen SoundScan)	39
New Zealand Albums (RMNZ)	49
US Billboard 200	51
US Heatseekers Albums (Billboard)	1
US Independent Albums (Billboard)	1

=== Year-end charts ===
2001 year-end chart performance
Chart (2001)	Position
Canadian Albums (Nielsen SoundScan)	170

2002 year-end chart performance
Chart (2002)	Position
Canadian Albums (Nielsen SoundScan)	99
Canadian Alternative Albums (Nielsen SoundScan)	30
Canadian Metal Albums (Nielsen SoundScan)	15
US Billboard 200	97

== Certifications ==
Certifications
Region	Certification	Certified units/sales
Canada (Music Canada)	Platinum	100,000^{^}
United States (RIAA)	Platinum	1,000,000^{^}
^{^} Shipments figures based on certification alone.

== Limited edition DVD ==
1. "Wasting My Time (Video)"
2. "Deny (Video)"
3. "Deny (Live)"
4. "Rockumentary"
