= Comes and Goes (album) =

Studio album by Default
- Released: September 29, 2009
- Genres: Alternative rock; hard rock; post-grunge
- Length: 42:34
- Label: EMI Canada
- Producer: Bob Marlette

Default chronology
One Thing Remains (2005)	Comes and Goes (2009)	Re-Cuts (2018)

Singles from Comes and Goes
- 1. "All Over Me" Released: 2009; 2. "Little Too Late" Released: 2009; 3. "Turn It On" Released: 2009; 4. "Supposed to Be" Released: 2010; 5. "Yesterday's Song" Released: 2010

Professional ratings
Review scores
Source	Rating
TuneLab Music	(6.5/10)

Comes and Goes is the fourth studio album by Canadian hard rock band Default. It was released on September 29, 2009 in Canada and internationally on October 26, 2010. The band has released four singles from the album: "All Over Me", "Little Too Late", "Turn It On", and "Supposed to Be", all released exclusively in Canada. The music video for "All Over Me" was released on September 21, 2009. Comes and Goes debuted at No. 137 on the Billboard 200 chart.

== Content ==
Comes and Goes was originally going to be released on TVT Records, which went bankrupt in 2008. As a result, the band underwent several court cases before EMI Canada licensed the rights to the album. Label executives made the decision because they felt that Default was more financially viable than other TVT acts.

== Critical reception ==
Rating it two-and-a-half stars out of five, Christopher Tessmer of The Leader-Post thought that "Caught in the Moment" was one of the band's best songs, but otherwise found the album's sound "formulaic".

== Track listing ==
No.	Title	Writer(s)	Length
1.	"Turn It On"	Default; Marti Frederiksen; Bob Marlette	4:02
2.	"All Over Me"	Default; Richard Marx; Marlette	3:50
3.	"Little Too Late"	Default; Frederiksen; Zac Maloy; Marlette	3:58
4.	"Goodbye"	Default; Maloy; Marlette	3:02
5.	"Show Me"	Default; Frederiksen; Marlette	3:55
6.	"Hold Onto You"	Default; Maloy; Marlette	3:51
7.	"Comes and Goes"	Default; Frederiksen; Marlette	3:49
8.	"Supposed to Be"	Default; Frederiksen; Marlette	4:16
9.	"Caught in the Moment"	Default; Maloy; Marlette	4:37
10.	"Fascination"	Default; Frederiksen; Marlette	3:39
11.	"Yesterday's Song"	Default; Maloy; Marlette	3:30
Total length:			42:34

Bonus tracks

No.	Title	Length
12.	"Show Me (acoustic) (iTunes Canada bonus track)"	3:55
13.	"Little Too Late – (acoustic) (CD ROM bonus track)"	3:57
14.	"Comes and Goes (acoustic) (Telus Music Store bonus track)"	3:50
15.	"Supposed to Be (acoustic) (iTunes U.S. bonus track)"	4:13
16.	"Wasting My Time (2010 acoustic version) (Amazon.com MP3 download)"	4:25

== Personnel ==
Default

- Dallas Smith – vocals
- Jeremy Hora – guitar, backing vocals
- Dave Benedict – bass
- Danny Craig – drums

Additional personnel

- Bob Marlette – producer, engineer, mixing
- Sid Riggs – additional ProTools editing
- Keith Gretlein – assistant drum engineer
- Ted Jensen – mastering
- Leonard B. Johnson – A&R
- Alex Seif – production coordination
- Mark Maryanovich – photography
- Michelle Holtzkener – art direction
- Antoine Moonen – package design

== Charts ==
Chart performance
Chart (2009–2010)	Peak position
Canadian Albums (Nielsen SoundScan)	30
US Billboard 200	137
US Independent Albums (Billboard)	18
US Top Alternative Albums (Billboard)	22
US Top Hard Rock Albums (Billboard)	10
US Top Rock Albums (Billboard)	37
