= No Pleasantries =

Studio album by U.P.O.
- Released: May 30, 2000
- Genre: Post-grunge, Alternative rock
- Length: 50:12
- Label: Epic, Sony
- Producer: Rick Parashar, U.P.O.

U.P.O. chronology
No Pleasantries (2000)	The Heavy (2004)

No Pleasantries is the debut album of American post-grunge band U.P.O. Released on May 30, 2000, the album broke U.P.O. into the mainstream rock scene and was their most successful release. It was made available on iTunes on September 22, 2004.

In promotion of No Pleasantries, U.P.O. toured throughout 2000 with popular acts such as Linkin Park, Nickelback, Godsmack, and 3 Doors Down. July saw the group joining Slipknot, Slayer, and Metallica on the Tattoo the Earth Tour. U.P.O. played two more shows in 2001 before their brief hiatus.

== Reception ==
Professional ratings
Review scores
Source	Rating
Allmusic	3/5 stars

No Pleasantries boasted two chart-placing singles; "Godless" climbed to #5 on the Billboard Mainstream Rock Chart and “Feel Alive” reached #25. The album managed to sell over 100,000 copies.

David Reamer of Allmusic noted, "With a sound similar to Badmotorfinger-era Soundgarden and featuring vocal distortion like that employed by Travis Meeks of Days of the New fame, the album is nothing revolutionary, but it is full of quality tracks that will please all but the most jaded alternative fans." He also claimed that U.P.O. obviously "knows what it's doing" and enjoys making music. Vocalist Shawn Albro's varied delivery has also been compared to The Cult's Ian Astbury.

== Song appearances ==
"Godless" was included on MTV's Return of the Rock Vol. 2. Tattoo The Earth: The First Crusade included A live rendition of "Dust." "Feel Alive" was included on the soundtrack to Book of Shadows: Blair Witch 2 . A track entitled "Now You Want Me," which may be from the No Pleasantries sessions, was featured on the ECW Anarchy Rocks! compilation. Nash Bridges and ESPN Under the Helmet also bared tracks from No Pleasantries.

== Track listing ==
All lyrics are written by Shawn Albro; all music is composed by Shawn Albro and Chris Weber.

No.	Title	Length
1.	"Circle of Life"	3:24
2.	"Freaks and Pigs"	3:42
3.	"Feel Alive"	3:59
4.	"Godless"	4:14
5.	"Shame"	4:32
6.	"My Life"	4:07
7.	"Dust"	3:45
8.	"Catch the Sun"	4:06
9.	"Shut Up"	4:48
10.	"Autumn Grey"	4:51
11.	"The Hurt"	4:20
12.	"Dead"	4:17
Total length:		50:12

== Personnel ==
U.P.O.

- Shawn Albro - vocals
- Chris Weber - guitar
- Benjamin Shirley - bass guitar
- Tommy Holt - drums and percussion

Additional personnel

- Rick Parashar & Geoff Ott - engineering
- Brandon Vaughan - assistant engineering
- Rick Parashar & Kelly Gray - mixing
- Stephen Marcussen - mastering
- Steve Richards - A&R direction
- Steve Ross - A&R coordination
- Hooshik - art direction
- Dean Karr - photography

== Chart positions ==
=== Album ===
Year	Chart	Position
2000	Top Heatseekers	19

=== Singles ===
Year	Single	Chart	Position
2000	"Feel Alive"	Mainstream Rock Tracks	25
2000	"Godless"	Mainstream Rock Tracks	6
