= The Heavy (album) =

Studio album by U.P.O.
- Released: March 9, 2004
- Recorded: London Bridge Studios, Seattle, WA
- Genre: Post-grunge
- Length: 43:54
- Label: DRT Entertainment, Nitrus
- Producer: Rick Parashar, U.P.O.

U.P.O. chronology
No Pleasantries (2000)	The Heavy (2004)

The Heavy is the second album by American post-grunge band U.P.O. Released on March 9, 2004, it marks the band's return from a two-year hiatus and departure from Epic Records. As common among sophomore independent albums, The Heavy could not repeat the success of U.P.O.'s major label debut, No Pleasantries. It was made available on iTunes on September 22, 2004.

The album's cover art features a man sporting ragged clothing and straw engorging much of his head. This image is reminiscent of the artwork featured on No Pleasantries and may be intended as a direct reference. The cover's Parental Advisory label also has the word "mental" roughly etched in place of "parental."

== Promotion and touring ==
The song "Free" became the album's single and started gaining national radio support by February 2004. The following month, a music video, U.P.O.'s first, was produced by A Band Apart director Tom Gatsoulis.

U.P.O. embarked on The Heavy Tour beginning April 20 with an East Coast schedule. The tour carried on across the country into late 2004. After an October concert that same year, guitarist Chris Weber suffered a seizure before being rushed to a hospital. It was soon revealed that he had a meningioma brain tumor; Weber successfully underwent surgery on November 17. The rest of the band briefly performed without him into November before taking a break.

== Song appearances ==
The tracks "Now You Want Me" and "It's Alright" were featured in ESPN's "a race for the cup" for the Stanley Cup Finals. The latter was also included on UFC: Ultimate Beat Downs, Vol. 1. "The Underground" was featured on the Ozzfest Doggy Bag sampler.

== Track listing ==
All lyrics are written by Shawn Albro; all music is composed by Shawn Albro and Chris Weber.

No.	Title	Music	Length
1.	"Lies"	Shawn Albro	3:10
2.	"I Feel"	Albro	2:59
3.	"Murder @ the Movies"	Albro, Chris Weber	3:00
4.	"The Fall"	Albro, Weber	3:37
5.	"It's Alright"	Albro, Weber	2:30
6.	"Always the Rain"	Albro	3:21
7.	"Go"	Albro	4:18
8.	"Free"	Albro, Weber	4:54
9.	"N.Y.W.M."	Albro, Weber	3:02
10.	"Dive"	Albro, Weber	3:49
11.	"Walk on Water"	Albro, Weber	4:23
12.	"The Underground"	Albro, Weber	4:51
Total length:			43:54

== Singles ==
- "Free" (2004)

== Personnel ==
U.P.O.

- Shawn Albro - vocals
- Chris Weber - guitar
- Benjamin Shirley - bass guitar
- Tommy Holt - drums and percussion

Additional personnel

- Rick Parashar - producer
- Joey Moi - Engineer
- Tim Palmer - Mixer
