= Pay the Girl =

- Origin: Cincinnati, Ohio
- Genres: Modern Rock; Pop rock
- Years active: 2001–2005
- Labels: TVT Records

Pay the Girl is a rock band from Cincinnati, Ohio.

== History ==
Lead singer Jason Allen Phelps first started performing in local venues in the Cincinnati area in the late 1990s, and decided to form a band in 2001. The group put out a demo EP soon after, which resulted in their signing with TVT Records in 2002, who landed a song of theirs, "Clueless", on the soundtrack to Swimfan. Later in 2002, the band opened for Shakira on her worldwide tour. TVT released their self-titled debut album in 2003, and the song "Freeze" peaked at #21 on the Billboard Adult Top 40 chart that same year.

== Discography ==
- Demo EP (2002)
- Pay the Girl (TVT Records, 2003)

== Members ==
- Jason Allen Phelps-vocals, guitar
- Mark Cooper-guitar, background vocals
- Dave Harris-guitar
- Drew Phillips-bass
- Greg Braun-drums

'Former members

- Josh Seurkamp-drums
- Mike Georgin-bass (formerly of Over the Rhine and Plow on Boy)
