= Patrice Pike =

American singer-songwriter (born 1970)

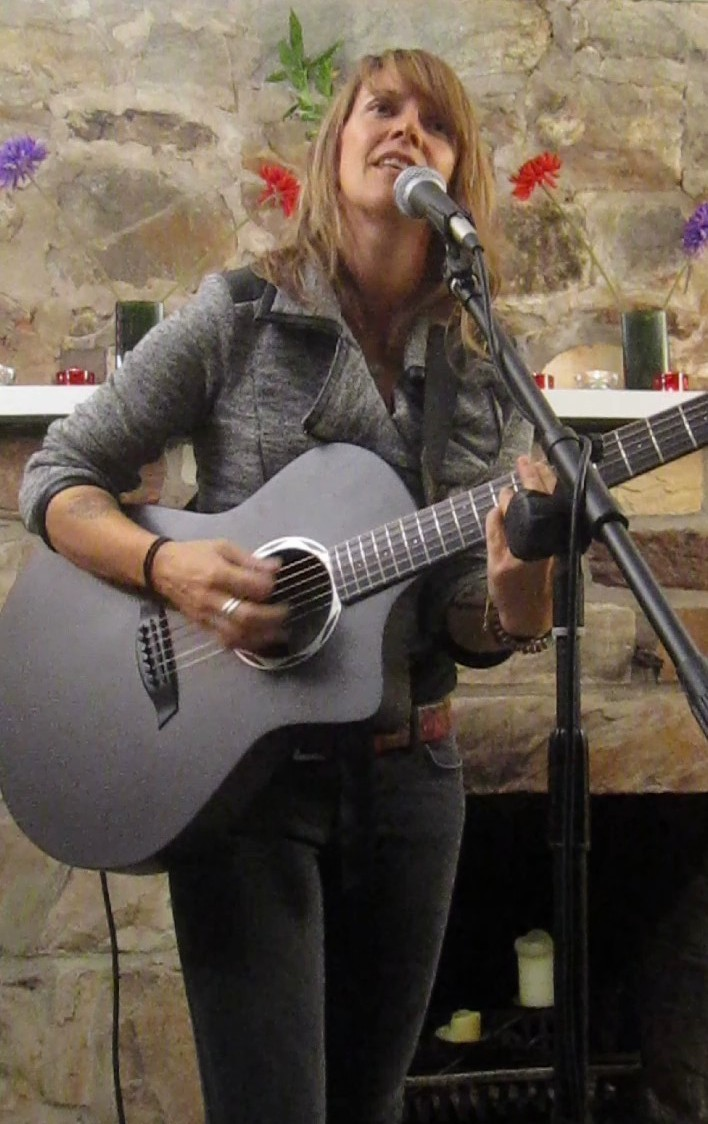
- Performing at a Stone Room Concert in Falls Church, Virginia, 2012

Background information
- Born: Patrice Rene Pike
- Origin: Dallas, Texas, U.S.
- Genres: Indie rock, singer-songwriter
- Years active: 1991–present
- Label: ZainWayne Records

Patrice Pike is an American singer-songwriter. She was the lead vocalist and rhythm guitarist for the Austin, Texas-based rock band Sister 7. The band produced three independent and three major label albums, and has toured in the U.S. and Western Europe.

== Early life ==
Pike was born in Dallas. Her stepfather was a touring guitarist. The first instrument she learned to play was the violin, which she learned via the Suzuki method. She attended Booker T. Washington High School for the Performing and Visual Arts. She attended the University of North Texas for a year, studying jazz.

== Career ==
In 2006, Pike participated in the musical competition series Rock Star: Supernova, lasting until the eighth week of competition. The show gave her a chance to play her original song "Beautiful Thing" for the TV audience, but it also distracted her from the mixing of her album Unraveling.

Pike has continued to play with Sister 7's lead guitarist Wayne Sutton. Together they have released several studio and live albums. In 2017 they founded a new musical project, Pike and Sutton, which released the album Heart Is a Compass in April 2020. They played Austin City Limits Music Festival in 2019.

== Step Onward Foundation ==
In 2006, Pike co-founded The Grace Foundation of Texas. Later renamed the Step Onward Foundation, the charity has helped families and young individuals facing homelessness or serious medical conditions, including providing scholarships. Pike was inspired on this path by a fan who suffered from medical issues in the wake of drug use, vagrancy, and being sex-trafficked.

== Personal life ==
Pike is bisexual, and has been out since 1994.

== Discography ==
Little Sister:

- Freedom Child (1992, Bay Leaf Productions – CCR9252)
- Free Love and Nickel Beer EP (1993, SBK Records)
- Little Sister (1995, Rhythmic Records – RR-9577-2)

Sister 7

- Sister 7 (1994, Rhythmic Records)
- This the Trip (1997, Arista Austin)
- Wrestling Over Tiny Matters (2000, Arista)
- Live (2001, Dualtone Music Group, Inc)
- Three Times Live DVD (2006, Tape Slap Records)

Patrice Pike & The Black Box Rebellion:

- Flat 13 (2001, Zain Music Alliance Records)
- Fencing Under Fire (2002, CSE Records)

Patrice Pike Band:

- Patrice Pike - New Cool Sampler (2004, ZainWayne Records)
- Patrice Pike - Live at the Brushwood Lounge (2005, ZainWayne Records)
- Unraveling (2006, Tape Slap Records)
- Patrice Pike and Friends - Live at the Brushwood Lounge (2011, ZainWayne Records)
- The Calling (2013, ZainWayne Records)

Pike & Sutton:

- Heart is a Compass (2020, ZainWayne Records)
