= Music at the Meadowlands =

Music at the Meadowlands was a rock festival held at Giants Stadium in East Rutherford, New Jersey, on 17 June 1979, which was headlined by Boston. Other bands that performed were Todd Rundgren's Utopia, The Outlaws and Poco. Over 55,000 people were in attendance.
