= One Thing Remains =

Studio album by Default
- Released: October 11, 2005
- Genres: Hard rock; post-grunge; alternative rock
- Length: 40:48
- Label: TVT
- Producers: Bob Marlette; Chad Kroeger; Joey Moi

Default chronology
Elocation (2003)	One Thing Remains (2005)	Comes and Goes (2009)

Singles from One Thing Remains
- 1. "Count on Me" Released: July 12, 2005; 2. "I Can't Win" Released: March 14, 2006; 3. "The Way We Were" Released: 2006

Professional ratings
Review scores
Source	Rating
Allmusic	3/5 stars

One Thing Remains is the third studio album by Canadian hard rock band Default. It was released on October 11, 2005. The album features a more straightforward hard rock sound than the band's previous work, downplaying their characteristic alternative metal elements. "The Memory Will Never Die" was used as one of the theme songs of World Wrestling Entertainment's (WWE) event WrestleMania 23 and WWE's Tribute to the Troops. The album produced three singles, including "Count on Me", which reached number one on the Canadian rock airplay chart and the top 40 on both the Mainstream and Alternative rock charts in the United States. The original demo version of "The Way We Were" was first recorded with Rich Robinson of the Black Crowes as its producer but later re-recorded for the album.

== Commercial performance ==
One Thing Remains reached number 12 on the Canadian Albums Chart.

== Critical reception ==
Dennis Fallon of the Centre Daily Times praised the band's sound for mixing rock and pop sounds while also being "heavy". The Province's Tom Harrison wrote that while the album appears to be acting as "damage control" for the band's second album which "didn't have the hits of the first one", with this album the band "forges boldly ahead as if nothing is wrong" and "sounds heavier and in control".

== Track listing ==
All songs written and composed by Default, except where noted.

1. "All Is Forgiven" – 4:08 (Default, Marti Frederiksen, Bob Marlette)
2. "I Can't Win" – 3:48 (Default, Frederiksen)
3. "It Only Hurts" – 3:42 (Default, Frederiksen)
4. "The Way We Were" – 3:28
5. "Count on Me" – 4:09 (Default, Chad Kroeger)
6. "Hiding from the Sun" – 3:32 (Default, Frederiksen, Marlette)
7. "Beautiful Flower" – 3:48 (Default, Frederiksen)
8. "One Thing Remains" – 2:57 (Default, Frederiksen)
9. "The Memory Will Never Die" – 4:23 (Default, Frederiksen)
10. "Get Out of This Alive" – 3:01
11. "Found My Way Out" – 3:47

== Personnel ==
Default

- Dallas Smith – vocals
- Jeremy James Hora – guitar, backing vocals
- Dave Benedict – bass
- Danny Craig – drums

Additional personnel

- Bob Marlette – producer, engineer, and mixing (tracks 1–4, 6–11)
- Chad Kroeger – producer (track 5)
- Joey Moi – producer and engineer (track 5)
- Ron Saint Germain – mixing, string production, string arrangements, and string engineer (track 5)
- Sid Riggs – Pro Tools and additional engineering
- Jake Davies – additional engineering
- Kevin Mills – mixing assistant
- Glenn Pittman – mixing assistant
- Ryan Andersen – digital editing (track 5)
- Bobby Yang – string arrangements (track 5)
- Pete deBoer – string engineer (track 5)
- Stephen Marcussen – mastering
- John Coster – product manager
- Leonard B. Johnson – A&R
- Benjamin Haber – band photography
- P. R. Brown – album design

== Charts ==
Chart performance
Chart (2005)	Peak position
Canadian Albums (Nielsen SoundScan)	12
US Billboard 200	90
US Independent Albums (Billboard)	7
