= Longview (British band) =

British indie rock band

- Origin: Manchester, England
- Genres: Indie rock
- Years active: 2002–2015
- Past members: Rob McVey; Aidan Banks; Doug Morch; Francesco Mendolia; Matt Dabbs; Ulrich Schnauss

Longview were a British indie rock band from Manchester, England.

== History ==
Its members were chief songwriter Rob McVey, guitarist Doug Morch, bassist Aidan Banks and drummer Francesco Mendolia. Original drummer Matt Dabbs left the band for family reasons during 2007. German electronic musician and record producer Ulrich Schnauss joined the band between 2005 and 2010 but left to concentrate on various other projects. The band formed in Manchester in 2002, and built its reputation with several appearances at The Night and Day Café. Longview subsequently signed to 14th Floor Recordings. Their only album, Mercury, was released in July 2003. Several singles were released from the album including their best known song, "Further", which featured on One Tree Hill and in commercials for the US Open. Notable other releases included a cover of Depeche Mode's "Stripped" which was only available as a digital download or on limited edition vinyl, and "In a Dream". The band worked on additional songs for what could have been their second album, but nothing was materialised and the band split up in 2015. Rob McVey is now solo and has been working on his first solo album. In addition to solo work, McVey recently joined a new band titled Paradise which features Sivert Høyem, Simone Butler, and Rob Ellis. Aidan Banks and Doug Morch joined a band called Miniseries and released their debut album "Pilot" in November 2025.

== Band members ==
- Robert Duncan McVey – vocals, guitar (2002–2015)
- Aidan Banks – bass (2002–2015)
- Doug Morch – lead guitar (2002–2015)
- Francesco Mendolia – drums (2011–2015)
- Matt Dabbs – drums (2002–2007)
- Ulrich Schnauss – keyboards (2005–2010)

== Discography ==
=== Studio albums ===
- Mercury (2003) No. 45 UK, re-issue (2005) No. 29 UK

=== Remix albums ===
- Subversions (2005)

=== Singles ===
- "Further" (2002)
- "When You Sleep" (2002) No. 74 UK
- "Nowhere" (2003) No. 72 UK
- "Falling for You" (vinyl only) (2003)
- "Electricity" (vinyl only) (2003)
- "Further" (second release) (2003) No. 27 UK
- "Can't Explain" (2003) No. 51 UK
- "Still" (2004) (Not eligible)
- "Stripped" (2004) (vinyl only)
- "In a Dream" / "River" (2004) No. 38 UK
- "Coming Down" / "When You Sleep" (remix) (2005) No. 32 UK
- "Further" (remix) (2005) No. 24 UK
