= Sister 7 =

Sister 7 is an American rock band from Austin, Texas.

Patrice Pike originally met guitarist Wayne Sutton when they were high school students in Dallas, Texas.

Originally called 'Little Sister,' the band began playing in Dallas at venues such as Club Dada. They would eventually relocate to Austin where the group quickly moved from being an opening band into a headlining role. The band remained popular in Austin for many years.

The band's debut EP appeared in 1994, followed by a full-length, self-produced recording and appearances on the H.O.R.D.E. Tour.

The band released two further full-length studio albums and scored a hit with the song "Know What You Mean," which reached #21 on the Adult Top 40 charts and #76 on the Billboard Hot 100.

== Members ==
- Patrice Pike - vocals
- Wayne Sutton - guitar
- Darrell Phillips - bass
- Sean Phillips - drums

== Discography ==
- Free Love and Nickel Beer EP (SBK Records, 1994)
- Little Sister/Sister 7 (Rhythmic Records, 1994)
- This the Trip (Arista Austin, 1997)
- Wrestling Over Tiny Matters (Arista Austin, 2000)
- Live (Dualtone Records, 2001)

=== Appears on ===
- "Flesh and Bones" on Lilith Fair New Music Sampler (1998)
