= Swimfan =

2002 film by John Polson

- Theatrical release poster
- Directed by: John Polson
- Written by: Charles Bohl; Phillip Schneider
- Produced by: Joseph M. Caracciolo Jr. John Penotti
- Starring: Jesse Bradford; Erika Christensen; Shiri Appleby
- Cinematography: Giles Nuttgens
- Edited by: Sarah Flack
- Music by: Louis Febre
- Production companies: GreeneStreet Films; Cobalt Media Group; Furthur Films
- Distributed by: 20th Century Fox
- Release date: September 6, 2002
- Running time: 85 minutes
- Country: United States
- Language: English
- Budget: $10 million
- Box office: $34.4 million

Swimfan is a 2002 American teen psychological thriller film directed by John Polson and written by Charles Bohl and Phillip Schneider. Starring Jesse Bradford, Erika Christensen, and Shiri Appleby, the film is about a high school swimming star who finds himself stalked by a teenage seductress after a one-night stand.

The film was panned by critics, with the plot drawing unfavorable comparisons to similar films like Fatal Attraction and Play Misty for Me, but was a box office hit.

== Plot ==
Ben Cronin is a star on his high school's swim team. His coach informs him that Stanford University scouts will appear at next week's swim meet. Ben and his girlfriend Amy discuss their plans. Amy wants to attend school in Rhode Island but explains she will go to school in California to stay close to Ben. The next day, Ben nearly runs his car into Madison Bell and gives her a ride home as an apology. Later, he realizes that Madison left her notebook in his car. When he returns the notebook, he meets Madison's cousin, Christopher. Madison explains that she has not eaten, so Ben takes her to a diner. At the diner, Ben tells Madison about his girlfriend, and Madison explains that she has a boy waiting for her in New York City.

Although Ben tries to end the date, Madison convinces him to go to the pool. Her aggressive flirtation lures Ben in, and the two have sex. They agree to remain friends and not to discuss their encounter.

The next night, Ben goes to a party at Amy's house. Amy introduces Ben to her new friend, who turns out to be Madison. The two pretend to have not met. Shortly after, Madison obsesses over Ben—she stops by his house to meet his mom and bombards him with e-mails and instant messages. Ben realizes her unhealthy behavior and demands that she leave him alone. His lying eats at him, but before he can confess, Madison tells Amy. Madison dates Ben's rival teammate, Josh. Right before their biggest swim competition, Ben is disqualified for having steroids in his urine. Outraged and suspecting Madison had Josh set him up, he confronts Josh about the drug test. Days later, Madison accidentally calls Josh by Ben's name while they are kissing. Josh realizes that Madison's obsession with Ben is real and tells her off.

Ben tries to tell Amy everything, but she doesn't believe him. The next day, he goes to the pool, where he finds Josh dead. The police suspect that Ben murdered Josh, so to prove his innocence, he breaks into Madison's room to find evidence, where he discovers a bottle of steroids and a creepy shrine of his belongings. Christopher warns Ben of a similar case regarding a man named Jake Donnelly. When Ben visits Jake in the hospital, a nurse tells him that Jake's girlfriend Madison survived the crash.

Disguising herself as Ben, Madison steals his car and runs Amy off the road, with Ben being framed for the crime. That night at the hospital, Ben and a few friends record Madison confessing her crimes, resulting in her arrest. She escapes custody, then enters Ben's house and drags Amy to the school's swimming pool. After watching Madison throw a handcuffed Amy into the pool, Ben dives in. Madison attacks them with the handle of a pool cleaner, but Ben grabs one end, pulling her into the pool. Unable to swim, Madison drowns while Ben frees the drowned Amy and resuscitates her. Later, after watching a swim meet, Ben goes outside to his car, where he and Amy kiss and drive away.

== Cast ==
- Jesse Bradford as Benjamin "Ben" Cronin
- Erika Christensen as Madison Bell
- Shiri Appleby as Amy Miller
- Kate Burton as Carla Cronin
- Clayne Crawford as Josh
- Jason Ritter as Randy
- Dan Hedaya as Coach Simkins
- James DeBello as Christopher Dante
- Michael Higgins as Mr. Tillman
- Kia Joy Goodwin as Rene
- Nick Sandow as Detective John Zabel
- Pamela Isaacs as Mrs. Egan
- Phyllis Somerville as Aunt Gretchen
- Monroe Mann as Jake Donnelly
- Patricia Rae as Jake's nurse

== Filming ==
The film was shot in New Jersey and New York. It was partly financed by Furthur Films, a production company founded by actor Michael Douglas.

== Release ==
Swimfan opened in the number one spot at the North American box office in its first week of release, earning $12.4 million and beating My Big Fat Greek Wedding and City by the Sea.

The film was distributed by 20th Century Fox in most countries, which beat out Paramount Pictures/MTV Films and Miramax Films for distribution rights, with Icon Film Distribution distributing it in the United Kingdom. The worldwide box office gross was $34.4 million; nearly a third of that came from its first-place opening weekend in the US. Director John Polson credited the film's strong opening weekend to Fox's marketing campaign.

== Reception ==
On the review aggregator website Rotten Tomatoes, 15% of 93 critics' reviews are positive, with an average rating of 3.9/10. The website's consensus reads: "A Fatal Attraction rip-off, Swimfan is a predictable, mediocre thriller." Metacritic, which uses a weighted average, assigned the film a score of 29 out of 100, based on 19 critics, indicating "generally unfavorable" reviews. Audiences surveyed by CinemaScore gave the film a grade of "B−" on a scale of A+ to F.

Peter Bradshaw gave the film two stars out of five, calling it a "teen Fatal Attraction with an unappetising extra helping of Scream" and saying it lacks "the sardonic wit that parts of the script had seemed initially to promise".

Variety described it as a "chiller resolutely without chills, in which even the pool water always seems heated. And inasmuch as the pic never owns up to its own trashiness, it's not even enjoyable camp—like Mary Lambert's recent The In Crowd—even though there's about as much underage drinking, heavy petting and full-on sex as you can imagine this side of a very surprising PG-13 rating."

== Soundtrack ==
Swimfan

Soundtrack album by Various artists
- Released: August 27, 2002
- Genres: Alternative metal; nu metal; alternative rock
- Label: TVT

Professional ratings
Review scores
Source	Rating
Allmusic	3/5 stars

Track listing
No.	Title	Music	Length
1.	"Everything"	Pacifier (Shihad)	4:27
2.	"Greater Than Less Than"	Saliva	4:49
3.	"Cave"	Celebrity	3:33
4.	"Deny" (Acoustic)	Default	3:53
5.	"Slow Down"	Wayne	4:29
6.	"Black"	Sevendust	4:09
7.	"Whole"	Flaw	3:49
8.	"Down In Me"	Allergic	3:01
9.	"Roll Over & Play Dead"	Portable	3:36
10.	"Clueless"	Pay the Girl	3:50
11.	"Too Much Too Soon"	Llama	3:35
12.	"Jesus Says"	Ash	4:43

== See also ==
- The Fan (1996 film)
