= U.P.O. =

American rock band (formed 1997)

- Origin: Los Angeles, California, U.S.
- Genres: Hard rock; post-grunge
- Years active: 1997–2004
- Labels: Epic; DRT
- Past members: Shawn Albro; Chris Weber; Ben Shirley; Tommy Holt; Zoltan Bathory; Philippe Mathys

U.P.O. was an American rock band from Los Angeles, formed in 1997. The band's line-up originally included Shawn Albro (lead vocals), Chris Weber (guitar), Ben Shirley (bass) and Tommy Holt (drums). Shirley and Holt left and were replaced by Zoltan Bathory (now in Five Finger Death Punch) and Philippe Mathys shortly before the band's breakup in 2004.

U.P.O. released two studio albums – No Pleasantries (2000) and The Heavy (2004).

== History ==
Both frontman Shawn Albro and guitarist Chris Weber began their careers as a part of the mid-1980s glam metal scene. Weber was actually a founding member of the band Hollywood Rose, which served as the precursor to the legendary band Guns N' Roses, while Albro sang lead for the band Wicked Teaze.

=== Formation and No Pleasantries (1997–2001) ===
After meeting in the mid '90s, at the Reading Festival in England, Weber and singer Shawn Albro began working on material that eventually gained some major label interest. They recruited bassist Ben Shirley and drummer Tommy Holt, forming U.P.O., and going on to sign a record deal with Epic Records. They released their debut album, titled No Pleasantries, in 2000, produced by Rick Parashar, with the album peaking at number 19 on the Billboard Heatseekers Chart while the singles "Godless" and "Feel Alive" peaked at number 6 and 25 on the Mainstream Rock Chart respectively. "Feel Alive" appeared on the soundtrack to the film Book of Shadows: Blair Witch 2 while the group toured with the likes of Slipknot, Slayer, Mudvayne and Sepultura as part of the Tattoo The Earth tour with the song "Dust" being included on the live album Tattoo The Earth: The First Crusade. After further touring in support of the album, the group went on hiatus with Albro auditioning for "The Project" (later known as Velvet Revolver) during this time.

=== The Heavy and Hiatus (2004–present) ===
The group returned in 2004, recording and releasing The Heavy, working again with producer Rick Parashar, the same year through DRT Entertainment/Nitrus Records. Following this, a second guitarist, Logan, joined the band, and Shirley and Holt left due to creative differences and were replaced by Zoltan Bathory and Philippe Mathys respectively. The group toured in support of the album, however, after an October concert later that year, Weber suffered a seizure before being rushed to a hospital. It was soon revealed that he had a meningioma brain tumor for which Weber underwent successful surgery on November 17, 2004. The group disbanded soon afterwards with Bathory going on to form Five Finger Death Punch and Mathys joining Hydrovibe.

== Discography ==
=== Studio albums ===
- No Pleasantries (2000)
- The Heavy (2004)

== Members ==
Final line-up

- Shawn Albro – vocals (1997–2004)
- Chris Weber – guitar (1997–2004)
- Logan – guitars, backing vocals (2004)
- Zoltan Bathory – bass (2004)
- Philippe Mathys – drums (2004)

Founding members

- Ben Shirley – bass (1997–2004)
- Tommy Holt – drums (1997–2004)
