= Rick Parashar =

American record producer (1963–2014)

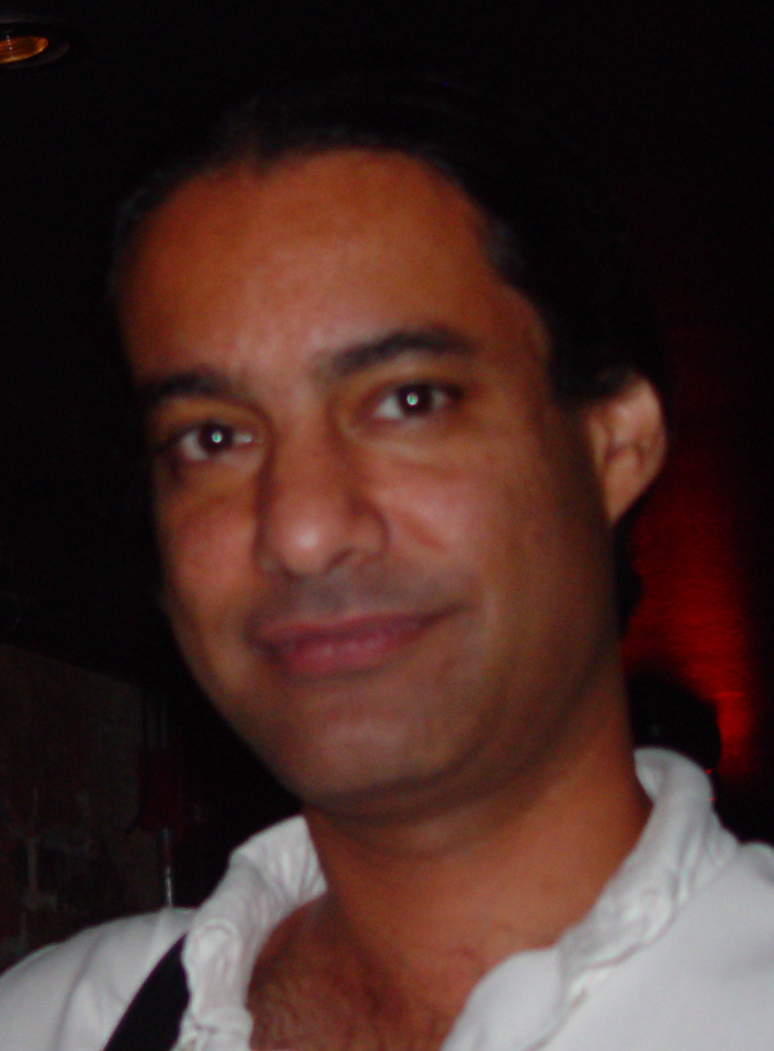
- Parashar in 2003

Background information
- Born: Rakesh Parashar; December 13, 1963; Seattle, Washington, U.S.
- Died: August 14, 2014 (aged 50) Seattle, Washington, U.S.
- Occupations: Record producer; recording engineer; musician
- Instruments: Piano; keyboards; percussion
- Years active: 1985–2014

Rakesh "Rick" Parashar (December 13, 1963 – August 14, 2014) was an American record producer, recording engineer and musician. Along with his brother Raj, he founded London Bridge Studio in Shoreline, Washington, in 1985. During his career he worked with and helped develop many local artists, including Alice in Chains, Pearl Jam, Brandi Carlile, Forced Entry and My Goodness.

Helmed by Parashar's production and recording services, London Bridge became the center of the Seattle music scene. His credits include multi-platinum releases for Temple of the Dog, Alice in Chains, Pearl Jam, Blind Melon and Dinosaur Jr. Parashar's projects were not just limited to Seattle artists; in 2001 he produced 3 Doors Down's multi-platinum record Away from the Sun, and was nominated for a Grammy for Nickelback's Silver Side Up, which sold in excess of six million copies. His production credits also include platinum albums for Melissa Etheridge, Bon Jovi and Unwritten Law.

In addition to producing and engineering, Parashar played piano (including Fender Rhodes), organ and percussion on the Pearl Jam tracks "Black" and "Jeremy" as well as Temple of the Dog's "Call Me a Dog", "All Night Thing", and "Times of Trouble".

On August 15, 2014, it was reported that Parashar had died at his home in Seattle's Queen Anne neighborhood, from complications arising from a pulmonary embolism. He was 50.

== Production discography ==
- Forced Entry - Uncertain Future (1989)
- Temple of the Dog – Temple of the Dog (1991)
- Pearl Jam – Ten (1991)
- Alice in Chains – Sap (1992)
- Alice in Chains - Dirt (produced "Would?") (1992)
- Blind Melon – Blind Melon (1992)
- Pride & Glory – Pride & Glory (1994)
- Litfiba – Spirito (1994)
- Litfiba - Lacio Drom (Buon Viaggio) (1995)
- Super 8 - Super 8 (1996)
- New World Spirits – Fortune Cookie (1996)
- Mollies Revenge - Every Dirty Word (1997)
- Unwritten Law – Unwritten Law (1998)
- U.P.O. – No Pleasantries (2000)
- Nickelback – Silver Side Up (2001)
- Stereomud – Perfect Self (2001)
- Anyone – Anyone (2001)
- Craving Theo - Craving Theo (2001)
- Epidemic – Epidemic (2002)
- 3 Doors Down – Away from the Sun (2002)
- Default - The Fallout (2001)
- Longview – Mercury (2003)
- Outspoken - Bitter Shovel (2003)
- Melissa Etheridge – Lucky (2004)
- U.P.O. – The Heavy (2004)
- Alex Lloyd – Alex Lloyd (2005)
- Bon Jovi – Have a Nice Day (2005)
- Radiocraft – "Catch Your Death" (2006)
- Ugly – Ugly (2007)
- 10 Years – Division (2008)
- Juke Kartel - Nowhere Left to Hide (2009)
- My Goodness – Shiver + Shake (2014)
