= Default (band) =

Canadian rock band

- Origin: Vancouver, British Columbia, Canada
- Genres: Hard rock; post-grunge; alternative rock
- Years active: 1999–2013, 2018-present
- Labels: EMI Canada; The Orchard; TVT
- Members: Dallas Smith; Jeremy Hora; Dave Benedict; Danny Craig

Default is a Canadian rock band formed in Vancouver in 1999. Since forming, the band has released four albums, and has sold more than a million records. The majority of their fan base is in Canada, but they had brief mainstream success in the United States with the release of their hit single "Wasting My Time".

The group disbanded in 2013 after a hiatus following the release of their fourth album, and lead singer Dallas Smith pursued a country music solo career. In 2018, Default announced that they were back together. The band also announced a tour in support of Stone Temple Pilots and Seether, and a co-headline tour with Ages of Days. No new material has since surfaced from the band, as Smith remained active with his solo endeavors.

Between 1996 and 2016, Default was among the top 150 best-selling Canadian artists in Canada and among the top 50 best-selling Canadian bands in Canada.

== History ==
Upon obtaining their demo tape, Chad Kroeger, the vocalist of fellow Canadian post-grunge and alternative rock band Nickelback, discovered the band, subsequently lending support and co-producing their first two albums. Default's 2001 debut album, The Fallout, achieved success due to strong radio play of "Wasting My Time" and "Deny". In 2002, Default won the Juno Award for "Best New Group". On August 23, 2002, The Fallout was certified platinum by Canada's CRIA, and on April 30, 2003, it was certified platinum in the United States by the RIAA, signifying a million records sold.

On September 28, 2013, the band announced on their official Facebook page that the band were not splitting up, but taking a break and starting different projects. Since 2018, the band have sporadically played shows together while Smith focuses on his Country career. They toured with Stone Temple Pilots in 2018, and took part in Edmonton's Rockin' Thunder festival in 2025.

== Awards and nominations ==
Award	Year	Nominee(s)	Category	Result	Ref.
Teen Choice Awards	2002	"Wasting My Time"	Choice Rock Track	Nominated	

== Band members ==
- Dallas Smith – lead vocals, occasional rhythm guitar
- Jeremy Hora – lead guitar
- Dave Benedict – bass
- Danny Craig – drums, percussion

== Discography ==
=== Studio albums ===
List of studio albums, with selected chart positions, sales figures and certifications
Title	Album details	Peak chart positions						Certifications
Title	Album details	CAN	AUS	NZ	US	US Indie	US Rock	Certifications
The Fallout	Released: October 2, 2001; Label: TVT; Format: CD	39	85	49	51	1	—	MC: Platinum; RIAA: Platinum
Elocation	Released: November 25, 2003; Label: TVT; Format: CD	49	—	—	105	3	—	MC: Gold
One Thing Remains	Released: October 11, 2005; Label: TVT; Format: CD	12	—	—	90	7	—	
Comes and Goes	Released: September 29, 2009; Label: EMI Canada; Format: CD	30	—	—	137	18	37	
"—" denotes a release that did not chart.

=== Extended plays ===
Title	EP details
Re-Cuts	Release date: October 12, 2018; Label: Maybe That Productions; Formats: CD, digital download, streaming

=== Singles ===
Year	Single	Peak chart positions										Album
Year	Single	CAN HAC	CAN Rock	US	US Adult	US Alt.	US Main.	AUS	NLD	NZ	UK	Album
2001	"Wasting My Time"	x	1	13	14	3	2	43	97	37	73	The Fallout
2002	"Deny"	x	1	—	—	14	7	99	—	—	—	The Fallout
2002	"Live a Lie"	x	x	—	36	—	31	—	—	—	—	The Fallout
2002	"Sick and Tired"	x	x	—	—	—	—	—	—	—	—	The Fallout
2003	"(Taking My) Life Away"	—	17	—	30	—	25	—	—	—	—	Elocation
2004	"Throw It All Away"	—	12	—	—	—	30	—	—	—	—	Elocation
2004	"All She Wrote"	12	—	—	39	—	—	—	—	—	—	Elocation
2005	"Count on Me"	27	12	—	—	39	22	—	—	—	—	One Thing Remains
2006	"I Can't Win"	—	10	—	—	—	—	—	—	—	—	One Thing Remains
2006	"The Way We Were"	—	—	—	—	—	—	—	—	—	—	One Thing Remains
2009	"All Over Me"	—	7	—	—	—	—	—	—	—	—	Comes and Goes
2009	"Little Too Late"	16	—	—	—	—	—	—	—	—	—	Comes and Goes
2009	"Turn It On"	—	7	—	—	—	38	—	—	—	—	Comes and Goes
2010	"Supposed to Be"	—	—	—	—	—	—	—	—	—	—	Comes and Goes
"—" denotes a release that did not chart or was not released in that area. "x" denotes a release whose peak position cannot be verified or for which no relevant chart existed at the time of its release.

=== Promotional singles ===
Year	Single	Album
2007	"It Only Hurts"	One Thing Remains
2010	"Yesterday's Song"	Comes and Goes

== See also ==
- Canadian rock
- Music of Canada
- List of bands from Canada
