= Qwerty (disambiguation) =

QWERTY is a keyboard layout.

QWERTY may also refer to:

== Arts, entertainment, and media ==
- Qwerty, a character in the Marvel Comics including Morlocks characters
- Qwerty, a computer in the children's film series VeggieTales
- Dashiell Qwerty, a character in Lemony Snicket's All The Wrong Questions series

== Other uses ==
- Qwerty Films, a British film production company
- Switching barriers, also known as the QWERTY effect
- "Qwerty", a song by Linkin Park, released for their fan club exclusive LP Underground 6.0 EP and on the compilation Papercuts (Singles Collection 2000–2023) (2024).
- "Qwerty", a song by Mushroomhead from the 2014 album The Righteous & the Butterfly

== See also ==
- Kuerti
