= Songs from the Underground =

Compilation album by Linkin Park
- Released: November 28, 2008
- Recorded: 1999–2008
- Genres: Nu metal; rap metal; rap rock
- Length: 36:45
- Labels: Warner Bros.; Machine Shop
- Producers: Joe Hahn; Andrew Murdock; Rick Rubin; Mike Shinoda

Linkin Park chronology
Road to Revolution: Live at Milton Keynes (2008)	Songs from the Underground (2008)	A Decade Underground (2010)

Professional ratings
Review scores
Source	Rating
AllMusic	3/5 stars

Songs from the Underground is the first compilation album by American rock band Linkin Park, released on November 28, 2008.

== Background ==
The album features songs previously released through the Linkin Park Underground fan club, as well as two previously unreleased live tracks from Projekt Revolution 2008. "And One" and "Part of Me" were included in the Hybrid Theory (EP) (the band's debut EP). "Dedicated" was a demo originally released on LP Underground 2.0. "Sold My Soul to Yo Mama" (a track made by Linkin Park turntablist and sampler player Joe Hahn, and guitarist/keyboardist/vocalist Mike Shinoda, which includes samples from songs "Points of Authority" and "Papercut"), was released exclusively for LP Underground 4.0. "Announcement Service Public" and "QWERTY" are found in the LP Underground 6.0. "Hunger Strike", a song by Temple of the Dog, was performed by its lead singer Chris Cornell (whom the band toured with), and features a surprise guest appearance by Linkin Park lead vocalist Chester Bennington.

Inside the physical CD, a leaflet can be found, inside which includes a free trial for a membership at LP Underground, as well as a limited free download of a live version of "Crawling", featuring Chris Cornell.

== Track listing ==
No.	Title	Writer(s)	Length
1.	"Announcement Service Public"	Linkin Park	2:23
2.	"Qwerty" (Studio Version)	Linkin Park	3:20
3.	"And One"	Mike Shinoda, Joe Hahn, Brad Delson, Chester Bennington, Rob Bourdon	4:28
4.	"Sold My Soul to Yo Mama"	Hahn, Bennington, Shinoda	1:56
5.	"Dedicated" (Demo 1999)	Shinoda, Delson, Hahn, Bennington	3:10
6.	"Hunger Strike" (Live from Projekt Revolution 2008 – Chris Cornell featuring Chester Bennington)	Chris Cornell	4:12
7.	"My December" (Live 2008)	Shinoda	4:12
8.	"Part of Me" (includes hidden track at 9:57)	Shinoda, Hahn, Delson, Bennington, Bourdon	12:40
Total length:			36:45

Additional downloadable track
No.	Title	Writer(s)	Length
9.	"Crawling" (Live at Projekt Revolution 2008 – includes verses from "Hands Held High") (featuring Chris Cornell)	Linkin Park	4:50

== Charts ==
Chart (2009)	Peak position
Austrian Albums (Ö3 Austria)	56
Czech Albums (ČNS IFPI)	42
German Albums (Offizielle Top 100)	42
Japanese Albums (Oricon)	9
Swiss Albums (Schweizer Hitparade)	10
US Billboard 200	96

== See also ==
- Linkin Park discography
