= A Decade Underground =

Compilation album by Linkin Park, LP Underground
- Released: August 10, 2010
- Recorded: 1999–2008
- Genres: Alternative metal; nu metal
- Length: 43:00
- Label: Machine Shop
- Producer: Mike Shinoda

Linkin Park chronology
Songs from the Underground (2008)	A Decade Underground (2010)	A Thousand Suns (2010)

LP Underground chronology
LP Underground 9.0 (2009)	A Decade Underground (2010)	Underground X: Demos (2010)

A Decade Underground is a digital download set released on August 10, 2010, by Linkin Park Underground. The compilation album was the second compilation album and eleventh released EP by LP Underground. This release is one of the albums released per year by the fan club.

== Content ==
The album contains ten tracks. Out of these ten tracks nine are demos or lesser known songs from the band. The one track is a live cover of the band Temple of the Dog featuring its lead vocalist Chris Cornell. The album features tracks from the previous LP Underground albums by year.

The track listing contains all the tracks from their retail released compilation Songs from the Underground (2008) in the same order, but also includes the later released "Across the Line" and "Pretend to Be" as bonus tracks.

== Background ==
"And One" (3rd track) and "Part of Me" (8th track) are also included in the LP Underground 1.0, the re-issue of the Hybrid Theory EP, which was originally by the former name Hybrid Theory. Both the songs originally released on November 28, 2008, in Linkin Park's second EP Songs from the Underground.

"Dedicated (Demo 1999) (5th track) was included in the EP LP Underground 2.0 and was also included in the EP Songs from the Underground.

"Sold My Soul to Yo Mama" (4th track) is included in LP Underground 4.0, it contains samples of "Points of Authority" and "Papercut" that originally appeared in their first studio release of the band, Hybrid Theory (2000). The song originally appeared on Songs from the Underground.

"Announcement Service Public" (1st track) and "Qwerty" (2nd track) are included in LP Underground 6.0. Both tracks originally appeared on Songs from the Underground.

"My December (Live 2008) [Piano Version]" (7th track) in 2008, which can be heard on Songs from the Underground.

The Temple of the Dog cover of the song "Hunger Strike" performed by Chris Cornell with the band's lead vocalist Chester Bennington, can now be heard on the band's second extended play, Songs from the Underground.

"Across the Line " (9th track) can be heard on LP Underground 9.0: Demos.

"Pretend to Be" (10th track) can be heard on the LP Underground X: Demos album that was originally released on November 17, 2010, via Machine Shop and the LP Underground website.

== Track listing ==
No.	Title	Writer(s)	Length
1.	"Announcement Service Public"	Linkin Park	2:26
2.	"Qwerty" (Studio Version)	Linkin Park	3:23
3.	"And One"	Mike Shinoda, Joe Hahn, Brad Delson, Chester Bennington, Rob Bourdon	4:31
4.	"Sold My Soul to Yo Mama"	Hahn, Bennington, Shinoda	1:59
5.	"Dedicated" (Demo 1999)	Shinoda, Hahn, Delson, Bennington	3:13
6.	"Hunger Strike" (Temple of the Dog cover) (Live 2008 – Chris Cornell feat. Chester Bennington)	Chris Cornell	4:15
7.	"My December" (Live 2008) (Piano Version)	Shinoda	4:15
8.	"Part of Me"	Shinoda, Hahn, Delson, Bennington, Bourdon	12:43
9.	"Across the Line" (Unreleased Demo 2007)	Linkin Park	3:11
10.	"Pretend to Be" (Unreleased Demo 2008)	Linkin Park	3:55
Total length:			43:00

== Personnel ==
Linkin Park

- Chester Bennington – vocals (except on tracks: 1, 4 and 5)
- Rob Bourdon – drums, percussion (except on tracks: 4, 6 and 7)
- Brad Delson – lead guitar (except on tracks: 4, 6 and 7)
- Joe Hahn – turntablist, sampling, and programming (except on tracks: 6 and 7)
- Mike Shinoda – vocals (except on track: 6), rhythm guitar (tracks: 1, 4, 9 and 10), keyboard
- Dave "Phoenix" Farrell – bass guitar (except on tracks: 6, 7, and 8)
