= Qwerty (Linkin Park song) =

2024 single by Linkin Park

- Live in Tokyo version cover artwork

Single by Linkin Park

from the album LP Underground 6.0 and Papercuts (Singles Collection 2000–2023)
- Released: April 26, 2024
- Recorded: 2006
- Studio: The Mansion (Laurel Canyon, California)
- Length: 3:21 (studio version); 3:54 (Live in Tokyo)
- Label: Warner
- Songwriters: Chester Bennington; Rob Bourdon; Brad Delson; Dave Farrell; Joe Hahn; Mike Shinoda
- Producers: Rick Rubin; Mike Shinoda

Linkin Park singles chronology
"Friendly Fire" (2024)	"Qwerty" (2024)	"The Emptiness Machine" (2024)

Music video
- "Qwerty (Live Video)" on YouTube

"Qwerty" (stylised in all caps) is a song by American rock band Linkin Park. Originally recorded during sessions for their third studio album, Minutes to Midnight (2007), the song debuted on a four-date mini-tour of Japan in August 2006, which served as a break from the studio while the band was working on the album. The studio version of the track debuted on the LP Underground 6.0 (2006), an album made available exclusively to the band's official fan club, released on December 5, 2006.

It was later featured on the compilations Songs from the Underground (2008) and A Decade Underground (2010), as well as an 8-bit version featured on the Linkin Park's own video game, 8-Bit Rebellion! (2010). The song was officially released on digital platforms on April 12, 2024 as part of the band's fourth compilation album Papercuts (Singles Collection 2000–2023). The song was later released as the compilation's second single on April 26, 2024.

== Track listing ==
Digital single – Qwerty (Live in Tokyo, 2006)
No.	Title	Length
1.	"Qwerty" (Live in Tokyo, 2006)	3:54
2.	"Qwerty" (instrumental)	3:21
3.	"Qwerty"	3:21
Total length:		10:36

== Music video ==
The official live music video for "Qwerty" was released alongside the single on April 26, 2024. It was debuted and performed live in Tokyo, Japan in the Zepp Tokyo music hall on August 10, 2006 during the band's headlining set. The official music video features footage of the band from their show live in Chiba, Japan at the Summer Sonic Festival in Chiba Marine Stadium a few days later on August 13, 2006 performing the previously unannounced song for the Japanese audience for the third time, as the band referred to it as a new song.

== Personnel ==
Linkin Park

- Chester Bennington – lead vocals
- Rob Bourdon – drums
- Brad Delson – guitars
- Dave "Phoenix" Farrell – bass guitars
- Joe Hahn – samplers, turntables
- Mike Shinoda – rap vocals

== Charts ==
Chart performance for "Qwerty"
Chart (2024)	Peak position
Belarus Airplay (TopHit)	173
US Hot Hard Rock Songs (Billboard)	5
