= Pushin Forward Back =

Promotional single by Temple of the Dog

from the album Temple of the Dog
- B-side: "Hunger Strike" "Your Saviour"
- Released: 1991
- Recorded: November–December 1990 at London Bridge Studios, Seattle, Washington
- Genre: Grunge
- Length: 3:44
- Label: A&M
- Songwriters: Jeff Ament, Stone Gossard, Chris Cornell
- Producers: Rick Parashar, Temple of the Dog

Temple of the Dog singles chronology
"Say Hello 2 Heaven" (1991)	"Pushin Forward Back" (1991)

"Pushin Forward Back" is a song by the American rock band Temple of the Dog. Featuring lyrics written by vocalist Chris Cornell and music co-written by bassist Jeff Ament and guitarist Stone Gossard, "Pushin Forward Back" was released in 1991 as the third single from the band's sole studio album, Temple of the Dog (1991).

== Origin and recording ==
"Pushin Forward Back" features lyrics written by vocalist Chris Cornell and music co-written by bassist Jeff Ament and guitarist Stone Gossard. It is one of four songs on the album for which vocalist Eddie Vedder provided backing vocals.

== Release and reception ==
"Pushin Forward Back" was released on vinyl in 1991 to promote the album. David Fricke of Rolling Stone said, "'Pushin Forward Back' is good shovin' built from the black thunder of Led Zeppelin and the twin-guitar lightning of the original Alice Cooper band....When Vedder joins Cornell in the chorus of 'Pushin Forward Back', their harmonies virtually bleed with need."

== Live performances ==
"Pushin Forward Back" was first performed live at the band's November 13, 1990, concert in Seattle, Washington, at the Off Ramp Café. Cornell added "Pushin Forward Back" to his solo live set in 2007.

== Track listing ==
All songs written by Chris Cornell, except where noted:

1. "Pushin Forward Back" (Jeff Ament, Stone Gossard, Cornell) – 3:44
2. "Hunger Strike" – 4:03
3. "Your Saviour" – 4:02
