= Say Hello 2 Heaven =

Single by Temple of the Dog

from the album Temple of the Dog
- B-side: "Wooden Jesus"
- Released: September 1992 (US promo)
- Recorded: 1990
- Studio: London Bridge (Seattle)
- Genre: Grunge; alternative rock
- Length: 6:22
- Label: A&M
- Songwriter: Chris Cornell
- Producers: Rick Parashar, Temple of the Dog

Temple of the Dog singles chronology
| "Hunger Strike" (1991) | "Say Hello 2 Heaven" (1992) | "Pushin Forward Back" (1991) |

"Say Hello 2 Heaven" is a song by the American rock band Temple of the Dog. Written by vocalist Chris Cornell, "Say Hello 2 Heaven" was released as the second single from the band's sole studio album, Temple of the Dog (1991). The song reached number five on the Billboard Mainstream Rock Tracks chart.

Cornell wrote "Say Hello 2 Heaven" as a tribute to his roommate, Mother Love Bone vocalist Andrew Wood, who at the time had recently died of a heroin overdose.

== Origin and recording ==
"Say Hello 2 Heaven" was one of two songs, the other being "Reach Down", to be written by vocalist Chris Cornell when he was on tour with Soundgarden in Europe prior to approaching former Mother Love Bone members Jeff Ament and Stone Gossard to record the songs. The recordings were originally planned to be released merely as a single before Temple of the Dog formed and decided to write more music. Cornell stated:

Right after Andy died, we [Soundgarden] went to Europe, and it was horrible, because I couldn't talk about it, and there was no one who had loved him around. I wrote two songs, "Reach Down" and "Say Hello 2 Heaven". That was pretty much how I dealt with it. When we came back, I recorded them right away. They seemed different from what Soundgarden naturally does, and they seemed to fit together. They seemed like music he would like. I got the idea to release them as a single, and to get at least Stone and Jeff, or all of Love Bone, to play on it. I had the idea for a couple days, then, with an artist's lack of self-confidence, I decided it was a stupid idea. Somehow those guys heard the tape, and they were really, really excited. Stone and Jeff and our drummer, Matt, had been working on a demo for what ended up being Pearl Jam, so we had the idea that we would make an EP or a record, and maybe even do some of Andy's solo songs.

In a 2016 interview, Cornell stated:

With all that’s been written about Temple of the Dog recently, it’s reminded me of the original meanings of those songs. Say Hello 2 Heaven, for example, was one of the songs I wrote directly for Andy Wood and the amount of times someone has requested I play that song for someone else who’s died have been numerous. That’s great that it’s become this anthem that makes somebody feel some comfort when they’ve lost someone, but recently I’ve become a little more possessive of the idea that this song was actually written for a specific guy and I haven’t forgotten that person. So I’ve been reminding myself and those in the audience where that song came from.

== Release and reception ==
"Say Hello 2 Heaven" peaked at number five on the Billboard Mainstream Rock Tracks chart. Outside the United States, the single was released commercially in Germany and the United Kingdom. David Browne of Entertainment Weekly called the song "something of an alternative-rock power ballad."

== Live performances ==
"Say Hello 2 Heaven" was first performed live at the band's November 13, 1990, concert in Seattle, Washington at the Off Ramp Café. Cornell added "Say Hello 2 Heaven" to his solo live set in 2007.

== Track listing ==
All songs written by Chris Cornell.

7" Vinyl (Germany)

1. "Say Hello 2 Heaven" – 6:22
2. "Wooden Jesus" – 4:09

CD (Germany and UK)

1. "Say Hello 2 Heaven" (edit) - 4:25
2. "Say Hello 2 Heaven" – 6:22
3. "Wooden Jesus" – 4:09

Promotional CD (US)

1. "Say Hello 2 Heaven" (edit) - 4:25
2. "Say Hello 2 Heaven" – 6:22

== Chart positions ==
| Chart (1993) | Peak position |
|---|---|
| US Mainstream Rock (Billboard) | 5 |

| Chart (2017) | Peak position |
|---|---|
| US Hot Rock & Alternative Songs (Billboard) | 25 |
| US Rock Digital Song Sales (Billboard) | 23 |
