= Friendly Fire (song) =

2024 single by Linkin Park

Single by Linkin Park

from the album Papercuts (Singles Collection 2000–2023)
- Released: February 23, 2024
- Recorded: April 2016; December 2023
- Studio: The Pool Recording (London); The Warehouse (Vancouver); Larabee (North Hollywood); Sphere (North Hollywood)
- Genre: Electropop, soft rock
- Length: 2:57
- Label: Warner
- Songwriters: Mike Shinoda; Brad Delson; Jonathan Green
- Producers: Mike Shinoda; Brad Delson

Linkin Park singles chronology
"Fighting Myself" (2023)	"Friendly Fire" (2024)	"Qwerty" (2024)

Music video
- "Friendly Fire" on YouTube

"Friendly Fire" is a song by American rock band Linkin Park. Originally recorded during sessions for their seventh studio album, One More Light (2017), it was later officially released on February 23, 2024, as the lead single from the greatest hits album Papercuts (Singles Collection 2000–2023) and features vocals from Chester Bennington that were recorded before his death in 2017. It appears as the 20th and final track on the album itself. The song was included in the setlist for the band's From Zero World Tour in 2024.

== Background ==
In June 2020, Linkin Park member and co-founder Mike Shinoda revealed the existence of a song that contained Chester Bennington's vocals made during the recording sessions for the band's seventh studio album, One More Light (2017). The song, titled "Friendly Fire", was composed by Shinoda, the band's guitarist Brad Delson, and musician Jon Green, the latter who also served as co-writer of two other songs on the album, "Nobody Can Save Me" and "Battle Symphony". Shinoda, however, mentioned that it would be "years" before it would be released. Shinoda and Delson did additional recording in December 2023 to finish the song for release, having been inspired to revisit the song while they were putting together the album.

== Composition ==
Eli Enis of Revolver described "Friendly Fire" as "[fitting] right in" with the electropop sound of One More Light.

== Release ==
On February 19, 2024, Linkin Park released a series of images and videos on their social media channels revealing a 30-second audio clip of "Friendly Fire"; they also made a preview of the song available on their SoundCloud page the next day. "Friendly Fire" was then released digitally on February 23, 2024, as well as in CD single format in Germany. The song is featured as the 20th and final track of Papercuts (Singles Collection 2000–2023), a greatest hits album of the band's career that was released on April 12, 2024.

Following Linkin Park's announced reformation in 2024 with new members Emily Armstrong and Colin Brittain, "Friendly Fire" was performed live for the first time at the band's first concert of the From Zero World Tour at the Kia Forum on September 11, 2024, with Armstrong taking up lead vocals and Brittain taking up drums and percussion.

== Music video ==
The music video for the song was released simultaneously with the song itself. It is made up of footage of the band during the One More Light recording sessions, particularly Bennington singing his parts for the song, backstage footage, as well as live performance clips from the One More Light tour. It was nominated for Best Alternative Video at the 2024 MTV Video Music Awards.

== Track listing ==
Digital download, CD single
No.	Title	Length
1.	"Friendly Fire"	2:56

Digital download (A Capella + Instrumental)
No.	Title	Length
1.	"Friendly Fire" (a capella)	2:58
2.	"Friendly Fire" (instrumental)	2:56
Total length:		5:54

== Personnel ==
Linkin Park

- Chester Bennington – vocals
- Rob Bourdon – drums
- Brad Delson – guitar
- Phoenix – bass guitar
- Joe Hahn – DJ
- Mike Shinoda – vocals, keyboards

Additional musicians

- Jon Green – additional guitar

Technical

- Mike Shinoda – production, engineer
- Brad Delson – production
- Andrew Dawson – co-production, additional programming
- Jon Green – additional production
- Corin Roddick – additional production, additional programming
- Andrew Bolooki – vocal production
- Ethan Mates – engineer
- Josh Newell – engineer
- Alejandro Baima – assistant engineer
- Warren Willis – assistant engineer
- Jerry Johnson – drum technician
- Manny Marroquin – mixing
- Brian "Big Bass" Gardner – mastering

== Charts ==
=== Weekly charts ===
Weekly chart performance for "Friendly Fire"
Chart (2024)	Peak position
Australia Digital Tracks (ARIA)	39
Austria (Ö3 Austria Top 40)	62
Bolivia Anglo Airplay (Monitor Latino)	11
Canada Rock (Billboard)	17
Czech Republic Airplay (ČNS IFPI)	4
Czech Republic Singles Digital (ČNS IFPI)	43
Estonia Airplay (TopHit)	47
France (SNEP)	197
France Radio (SNEP)	9
Germany (GfK)	40
Italy Airplay (FIMI)	71
Japan Hot Overseas (Billboard)	16
New Zealand Hot Singles (RMNZ)	11
Portugal (AFP)	143
Slovakia Airplay (ČNS IFPI)	98
Slovakia Singles Digital (ČNS IFPI)	77
Switzerland (Schweizer Hitparade)	60
UK Physical Singles (OCC)	10
UK Singles Downloads (Official Charts)	28
UK Singles Sales (OCC)	31
US Bubbling Under Hot 100 (Billboard)	2
US Digital Song Sales (Billboard)	22
US Hot Rock & Alternative Songs (Billboard)	13
US Rock & Alternative Airplay (Billboard)	1
Venezuela Airplay (Record Report)	42

=== Monthly charts ===
Monthly chart performance for "Friendly Fire"
Chart (2024)	Position
Estonia Airplay (TopHit)	49

=== Year-end charts ===
Year-end chart performance for "Friendly Fire"
Chart (2024)	Position
Estonia Airplay (TopHit)	167
US Rock Airplay (Billboard)	14

== Certifications ==
Certifications for "Friendly Fire"
Region	Certification	Certified units/sales
France (SNEP)	Gold	100,000^{‡}
^{‡} Sales+streaming figures based on certification alone.

== Release history ==
Release dates and formats for "Friendly Fire"
Region	Date	Format	Label	Ref.
Various	February 23, 2024	Digital download; streaming	Warner	
Germany	February 23, 2024	CD single	Warner	
Italy	February 23, 2024	Radio airplay	Warner	
