= Temple of the Dog (album) =

Studio album by Temple of the Dog
- Released: April 16, 1991
- Recorded: November–December 1990
- Studio: London Bridge (Seattle)
- Genre: Grunge
- Length: 54:59
- Label: A&M
- Producers: Rick Parashar; Temple of the Dog

Singles from Temple of the Dog
- 1. "Hunger Strike" Released: June 1992; 2. "Say Hello 2 Heaven" Released: September 1992

Temple of the Dog is the only studio album by the American rock band Temple of the Dog, released on April 16, 1991, through A&M Records. It is a tribute to Andrew Wood, the former lead singer of Malfunkshun and Mother Love Bone, who died on March 19, 1990, of a heroin overdose. The album has been certified platinum by the RIAA in the United States.

== Background ==
Soundgarden frontman Chris Cornell, who had been Mother Love Bone vocalist Andrew Wood's roommate, approached former Mother Love Bone members Stone Gossard and Jeff Ament about working on material he had written when he was on tour with Soundgarden in Europe. The line-up eventually included Soundgarden drummer Matt Cameron and newcomers Mike McCready (lead guitar) and Eddie Vedder (background vocals). McCready and Vedder were featured on the album due to their involvement with Ament and Gossard's next project, which became Pearl Jam. The name Temple of the Dog is derived from the opening lyrics of the Mother Love Bone song "Man of Golden Words": "Wanna show you something, like joy inside my heart. Seems I been living in the temple of the dog".

== Recording ==
The recording sessions took place from November to December 1990 at London Bridge Studios in Seattle, Washington. The album was recorded in only 15 days. The group worked with producer Rick Parashar, who also engineered, mixed, and played piano. Two songs on the album, "Reach Down" and "Say Hello 2 Heaven", were written in response to Wood's death, while other songs were written by Cornell on tour prior to Wood's death or re-worked from existing material from demos written by Gossard and Ament.

Ament described the collaboration as "a really good thing at the time" for him and Gossard that put them into a "band situation where we could play and make music". Gossard described the recording process as a "non-pressure filled" situation, as there were no expectations or pressure coming from the record company. Gossard later said it was "the easiest and most beautiful record, that we've ever been involved with". Cornell noted that there "was no concern about whether it would be good or not, we didn't even care, we just wanted to try it, which is probably why it's good."

This was the first recording studio experience for McCready and Vedder. Regarding McCready, Cornell said: "You almost kind of had to yell at him to get him to realize that in the five-and-a-half-minute solo of 'Reach Down', that was his time and that he wasn't going to be stepping on anybody else." The song "Hunger Strike" became a duet between Cornell and Vedder after Cornell was having trouble with the vocals at practice and Vedder stepped in. Cornell later said: "he sang half of that song not even knowing that I'd wanted the part to be there and he sang it exactly the way I was thinking about doing it, just instinctively".

== Music and lyrics ==
The recorded material was mostly slow and melodic; much different musically from the aggressive metal-influenced sound Cornell had been doing with Soundgarden. The songs bear the street-rock flavor of Mother Love Bone's music. Steve Huey of AllMusic said that the "record sounds like a bridge between Mother Love Bone's theatrical '70s-rock updates and Pearl Jam's hard-rocking seriousness ... Keeping in mind that Soundgarden's previous album was the overblown metallic miasma of Louder Than Love, the accessibly warm, relatively clean sound of Temple of the Dog is somewhat shocking, and its mellower moments are minor revelations in terms of Cornell's songwriting abilities."

All of the lyrics on the album were written solely by Cornell, and he also wrote the music for all but three of the songs. "Say Hello 2 Heaven" and "Reach Down" were written by Cornell in direct response to Andrew Wood's death. Lyrically, the rest of the songs on the album cover a variety of topics. Cornell stated that the lyrics for "Hunger Strike" express "somewhat of a political, socialist statement".

== Release and reception ==
Professional ratings
Review scores
Source	Rating
AllMusic	4.5/5 stars
Classic Rock	4.5/5 stars
Entertainment Weekly	B+
Kerrang!	4/5
Los Angeles Times	3.5/5 stars
Mojo	4/5 stars
NME	7/10
Q	4/5 stars
Rolling Stone	4/5 stars
Spin	2/5 stars

The album was released on April 16, 1991, through A&M Records and initially sold 70,000 copies in the United States. The album received favorable reviews, but failed to chart. In the summer of 1992, the album received renewed attention. Although it had been released more than a year earlier, A&M Records realized that they had in their catalog what was essentially a collaboration between Soundgarden and Pearl Jam, who had both risen to mainstream attention in the months since the album's release with their respective albums, Badmotorfinger and Ten. A&M decided to reissue the album and promote "Hunger Strike" as a single, with an accompanying music video. The attention allowed both the album and single to chart on the Billboard charts and resulted in a boost in album sales. Temple of the Dog ended up being among the 100 top-selling albums of 1992. By 2007, it had sold over 1,000,000 copies in the United States according to Nielsen SoundScan, and it has been certified platinum by the RIAA.

AllMusic staff writer Steve Huey wrote: "The album's strength is its mournful, elegiac ballads, but thanks to the band's spontaneous creative energy and appropriately warm sound, it's permeated by a definite, life-affirming aura." Rolling Stone staff writer David Fricke gave Temple of the Dog four out of five stars, saying: "For 'Hunger Strike' and 'Reach Down' alone, Temple of the Dog deserves immortality; those songs are proof that the angst that defined Seattle rock in the 1990s was not cheap sentiment, at least in the beginning. And you can't help but love the irony of an album, made in great sadness, kick-starting the last great pop mutiny of the twentieth century." David Browne of Entertainment Weekly gave the album a B+ and said: "Maybe because the musicians avoid the often-labored anthems they play with their own bands, the songs sound relaxed and airy without losing any of the crunch or drive of the best arena rock." He ended by stating: "Singer Chris Cornell's lyrics remain as annoyingly oblique as they are with Soundgarden, but don't worry. Just sit back and revel in the whomping guitars of Mike McCready and Love Bone member Stone Gossard as they mesh with the imaginative pummeling of Soundgarden drummer Matt Cameron—the untamed side of the much-hyped Seattle sound, in all its wailing glory." In 2016, the album was ranked at No. 12 on Rolling Stone's list of the "40 Greatest One-Album Wonders". In 2022, Stuart Berman and Jeremy D. Larson of Pitchfork included the album in their list of "The 25 Best Grunge Albums of the '90s". In 2025, Em Casalena of American Songwriter included the album in the site's list of "4 Grunge Albums That Are Way Better Than Nevermind".

Temple of the Dog included the singles "Hunger Strike", "Say Hello 2 Heaven", and the promo "Pushin Forward Back". "Hunger Strike", the lead single, was the most successful song from Temple of the Dog on the Billboard rock charts, reaching number four on the Mainstream Rock chart and number seven on the Modern Rock chart. "Say Hello 2 Heaven" also charted on the Mainstream Rock chart.

=== 25th anniversary releases ===
In 2016, a new mix of the album was made by Brendan O'Brien, and this mix was released in various formats to mark the 25th anniversary of the original release of Temple of the Dog. There were single-CD and either single- or double-LP releases (the two-LP package containing music on three sides and an etching on the fourth) that did not add any bonus material, as well as a double-CD release that added alternative new mixes of three songs done by Adam Kasper, demos, and alternate takes of five songs from the album, and a four-disc double-CD/single-DVD/single-Blu-ray release that added those bonuses, as well as footage from live performances in both the 1990s and 2010s and the music video produced for "Hunger Strike".

== Track listing ==
All lyrics are written by Chris Cornell; all music is composed by Cornell, except where noted.

No.	Title	Music	Length
1.	"Say Hello 2 Heaven"		6:22
2.	"Reach Down"		11:11
3.	"Hunger Strike"		4:03
4.	"Pushin Forward Back"	Jeff Ament, Stone Gossard	3:44
5.	"Call Me a Dog"		5:02
6.	"Times of Trouble"	Gossard	5:41
7.	"Wooden Jesus"		4:09
8.	"Your Saviour"		4:02
9.	"Four Walled World"	Gossard	6:53
10.	"All Night Thing"		3:52
Total length:			54:59

2016 Deluxe / Super Deluxe Edition Bonus Tracks
No.	Title	Length
11.	"Say Hello 2 Heaven" (Mixed by Adam Kasper)	6:24
12.	"Wooden Jesus" (Mixed by Adam Kasper)	4:49
13.	"All Night Thing" (Mixed by Adam Kasper)	3:52

2016 Deluxe / Super Deluxe Edition Disc 2 (Demos & Outtakes)
No.	Title	Length
1.	"Say Hello 2 Heaven" (Demo)	7:05
2.	"Reach Down" (Demo)	9:16
3.	"Call Me a Dog" (Demo)	5:51
4.	"Times of Trouble" (Demo)	5:39
5.	"Angel of Fire" (Demo)	6:58
6.	"Black Cat" (Demo)	5:12
7.	"Times of Trouble (Instrumental)" (Demo)	4:13
8.	"Say Hello 2 Heaven" (Outtake)	6:23
9.	"Reach Down" (Outtake)	9:50
10.	"Pushin' Forward Back" (Outtake)	3:30
11.	"Wooden Jesus" (Outtake)	4:46
12.	"All Night Thing" (Outtake)	3:43

2016 Super Deluxe Edition Disc 3 (DVD)
No.	Title	Length
1.	"Hunger Strike" (Live at the Off Ramp Cafe, 11/13/90)
2.	"Wooden Jesus" (Live at the Off Ramp Cafe, 11/13/90)
3.	"Say Hello 2 Heaven" (Live at the Off Ramp Cafe, 11/13/90)
4.	"Reach Down" (Live at the Off Ramp Cafe, 11/13/90)
5.	"Call Me a Dog" (Live at the Off Ramp Cafe, 11/13/90)
6.	"Times of Trouble" (Live at the Off Ramp Cafe, 11/13/90)
7.	"Say Hello 2 Heaven" (Live at the Moore Theatre, 12/22/90)
8.	"Hunger Strike" (Live at Lollapalooza in Phoenix, 9/8/92)
9.	"Hunger Strike" (Music Video)
10.	"Say Hello 2 Heaven" (Live at Alpine Valley, 9/3/11)
11.	"Hunger Strike" (Live at Alpine Valley, 9/4/11)
12.	"Call Me a Dog" (Live at Alpine Valley, 9/4/11)
13.	"All Night Thing" (Live at Alpine Valley, 9/4/11)
14.	"Reach Down" (Live at Alpine Valley, 9/4/11)
15.	"Call Me a Dog" (Live at Benaroya Hall, 1/15/15)
16.	"Reach Down" (Live at Benaroya Hall, 1/15/15)

2016 Super Deluxe Edition Disc 4 (Temple of the Dog Blu-Ray 5.1 Audio)
No.	Title	Length
1.	"Say Hello 2 Heaven" (Blu-Ray Audio 5.1 Mix)
2.	"Reach Down" (Blu-Ray Audio 5.1 Mix)
3.	"Hunger Strike" (Blu-Ray Audio 5.1 Mix)
4.	"Pushin' Forward Back" (Blu-Ray Audio 5.1 Mix)
5.	"Call Me a Dog" (Blu-Ray Audio 5.1 Mix)
6.	"Times of Trouble" (Blu-Ray Audio 5.1 Mix)
7.	"Wooden Jesus" (Blu-Ray Audio 5.1 Mix)
8.	"Your Saviour" (Blu-Ray Audio 5.1 Mix)
9.	"Four Walled World" (Blu-Ray Audio 5.1 Mix)
10.	"All Night Thing" (Blu-Ray Audio 5.1 Mix)
11.	"Say Hello 2 Heaven" (Live at the Moore Theatre, 12/22/90)
12.	"Say Hello 2 Heaven" (Live at Alpine Valley, 9/3/11)
13.	"Hunger Strike" (Live at Alpine Valley, 9/4/11)
14.	"Call Me a Dog" (Live at Alpine Valley, 9/4/11)
15.	"All Night Thing" (Live at Alpine Valley, 9/4/11)
16.	"Reach Down" (Live at Alpine Valley, 9/4/11)
17.	"Call Me a Dog" (Live at Benaroya Hall, 1/15/15)
18.	"Reach Down" (Live at Benaroya Hall, 1/15/15)

== Personnel ==
Temple of the Dog

- Jeff Ament – bass guitar; art direction, art design, photography
- Matt Cameron – drums, percussion
- Chris Cornell – lead vocals; harmonica (track 6), banjo (track 7)
- Stone Gossard – rhythm guitar, slide guitar, acoustic guitar
- Mike McCready – lead guitars
- Eddie Vedder – backing vocals (tracks 4, 8, 9), co-lead vocals (track 3)

Production

- Rich Frankel – art direction, art design
- Walberg Design – art direction, art design
- Don Gilmore – additional engineering
- Lance Mercer - photography
- Josh Taft – photography
- Rick Parashar – production, mastering; piano (tracks 5, 6, 10), organ (track 10)
- Ken Perry – mastering
- Temple of the Dog – production

== Charts ==
=== Album ===
Chart (1992)	Peak position
Canada Top Albums/CDs (RPM)	11
US Billboard 200	5
Chart (2013)	Peak position
Finnish Albums (Suomen virallinen lista)	48
Chart (2016)	Peak position
Swiss Albums (Schweizer Hitparade)	77
Chart (2017)	Peak position
Australian Albums (ARIA)	56
Canadian Albums (Billboard)	88
Italian Albums (FIMI)	87
New Zealand Albums (RMNZ)	35
Scottish Albums (Official Charts)	58
US Top Alternative Albums (Billboard)	11
US Top Hard Rock Albums (Billboard)	7
US Top Rock Albums (Billboard)	14
Chart (2026)	Peak position
Greek Albums (IFPI)	26

=== Singles ===
Year	Single	Peak chart positions				
Year	Single	US Main	US Mod	CAN	NZ	UK
1992	"Hunger Strike"	4	7	50	47	51
1992	"Say Hello 2 Heaven"	5	—	—	—	—
1992	"Pushin Forward Back" [promo]	—	—	—	—	—
"—" denotes singles that did not chart.

== Certifications ==
Region	Certification	Certified units/sales
Canada (Music Canada)	Platinum	100,000^{^}
United Kingdom (BPI)	Silver	60,000^{‡}
United States (RIAA)	Platinum	1,000,000^{^}
^{^} Shipments figures based on certification alone.^{‡} Sales+streaming figures based on certification alone.

== Accolades ==
Publication	Country	Accolade	Year	Rank
Kerrang!	United Kingdom	"100 Albums You Must Hear Before You Die"	1998	58
Rolling Stone	Germany	"The 500 Best Albums of All Time"	2004	474
Visions	Germany	"The Most Important Albums of the 90s"	1999	10
