= Linkin Park albums discography =

Linkin Park discography
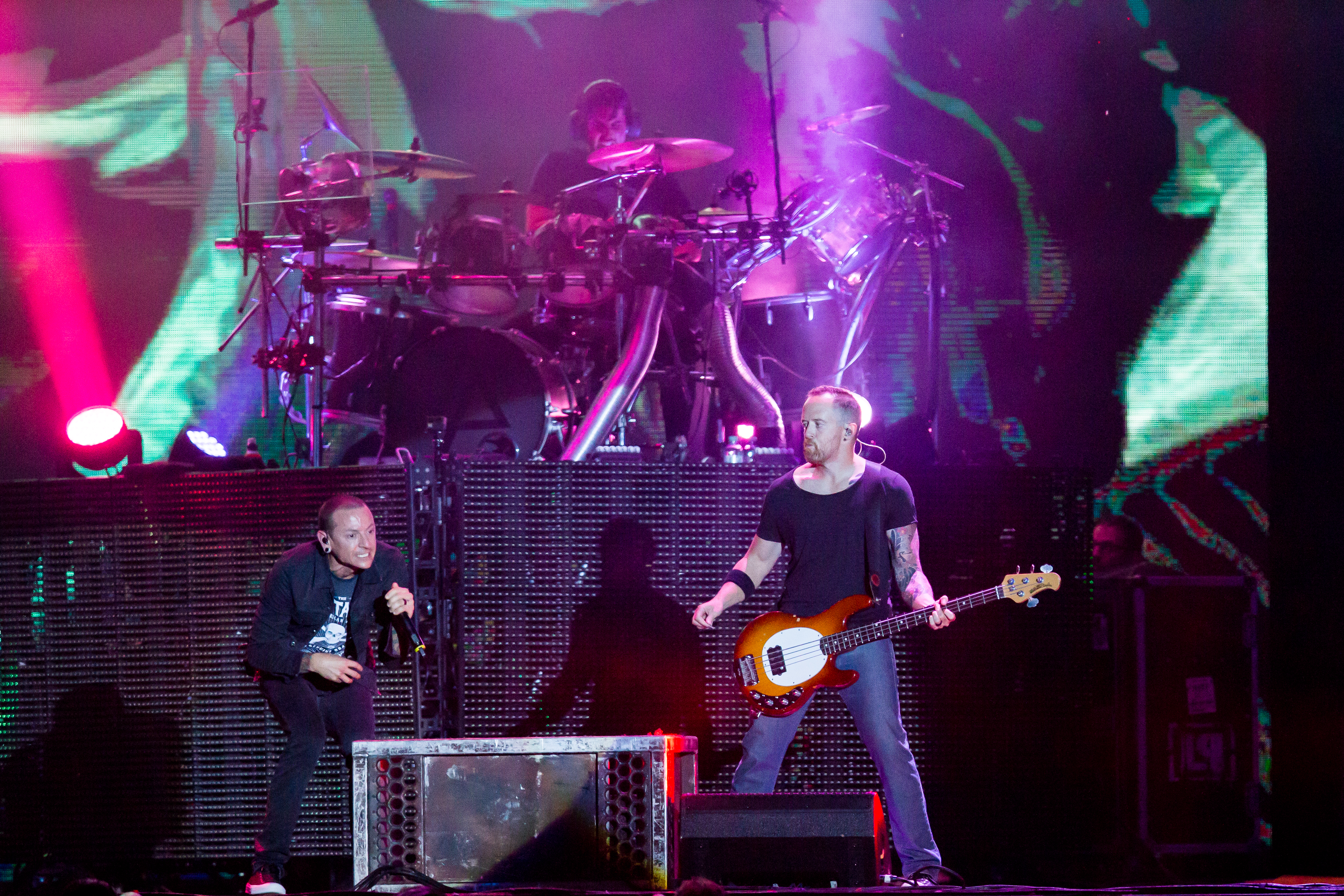
- Linkin Park performing in August 2015 in Hockenheim, Germany
- Studio albums: 8
- Extended plays: 28
- Soundtrack albums: 2
- Live albums: 4
- Compilation albums: 4
- Video albums: 4
- Demo albums: 16

American rock band Linkin Park has released eight studio albums, four live albums, four compilation albums, two remix albums, two soundtrack albums, 4 video albums and 28 extended plays. Linkin Park was formed in Agoura Hills, California, in 1996 by Mike Shinoda (vocals, keyboards, samplers and guitars), Brad Delson (guitar), and Rob Bourdon (drums). Joe Hahn (turntables) and Dave Farrell (bass) were later recruited, and in 1999, Chester Bennington (lead vocals) became a member, staying with the band until his death in 2017. Before Bennington joined the band, Mark Wakefield was their lead singer.

Linkin Park rose to international fame in 2000 with their debut album Hybrid Theory, which peaked at number two on the US Billboard 200. It was the seventh best-selling album of the 2000s, and certified Diamond in US and quadruple platinum in Europe. The fourth single from the album, "In the End", peaked at the second spot on the Billboard Hot 100 (the highest of Linkin Park's career), and stayed on the chart for 38 weeks. With first-week sales of 810,000, Linkin Park's second album Meteora (2003) entered the Billboard 200 at number one, becoming the third-best-selling album of the year.

In 2007, their third studio album, Minutes to Midnight, also debuted at number-one on the Billboard 200, selling 623,000 copies in its first week. A Thousand Suns (2010) became Linkin Park's third studio album to debut at the top of the Billboard 200, but its first-week sales were less than half of its predecessor—240,000 copies. Living Things followed in 2012, selling 223,000 copies in its first week and becoming the band's fourth studio album to debut at number one. The Hunting Party (2014) was their first album since Meteora not to debut at number one, debuting at number three, while One More Light (2017) peaked atop the chart and was the last album to be released before frontman Chester Bennington's sudden death in July 2017 and Rob Bourdon's departure in 2023. The band's eighth studio album From Zero was announced on September 5, 2024, and was released on November 15, 2024, with vocalist Emily Armstrong and drummer Colin Brittain subsequently replacing Bennington and Bourdon respectively.

Linkin Park has sold 70 million albums and 30 million singles worldwide, as well as selling over 29.4 million albums in their home country alone. The band has produced fourteen number-one singles on the Billboard Alternative Songs chart, and is the second-ever act to have at least ten weeks with three or more tracks on that chart. Two of these singles, "Crawling" and "Numb/Encore", earned the band two Grammy Awards. Linkin Park Underground, the band's official fan club, annually released EPs with rare tracks, demos, live recordings and remixes until 2017. Since Chester Bennington's death in July 2017, the band has not put together an LPU release.

== Albums ==
=== Studio albums ===
List of studio albums, with selected chart positions, sales figures and certifications
Title	Album details	Peak chart positions										Sales	Certifications
Title	Album details	US	AUS	AUT	CAN	FRA	GER	IRL	NZ	SWI	UK	Sales	Certifications
Hybrid Theory	Released: October 24, 2000; Label: Warner Bros.; Formats: CD, cassette, LP, download	2	1	2	5	17	2	4	1	5	4	WW: 32,000,000; US: 13,580,000; UK: 1,999,287	RIAA: 12× Platinum; ARIA: 5× Platinum; BPI: 7× Platinum; BVMI: 4× Platinum; IFPI AUT: Platinum; IFPI SWI: Platinum; MC: 5× Platinum; RMNZ: 7× Platinum; SNEP: Platinum
Meteora	Released: March 25, 2003; Label: Warner Bros., Machine Shop; Formats: CD, cassette, LP, download	1	2	1	2	3	1	1	1	1	1	WW: 27,000,000; US: 8,550,000; UK: 1,036,908	RIAA: Diamond; ARIA: 4× Platinum; BPI: 4× Platinum; BVMI: 5× Platinum; IFPI AUT: Platinum; IFPI SWI: Platinum; MC: 7× Platinum; RMNZ: 5× Platinum; SNEP: 2× Platinum
Minutes to Midnight	Released: May 15, 2007; Label: Warner Bros., Machine Shop; Formats: CD, LP, download	1	1	1	1	1	1	1	1	1	1	WW: 20,000,000; US: 3,300,000; UK: 774,814	RIAA: 5× Platinum; ARIA: 3× Platinum; BPI: 2× Platinum; BVMI: 9× Gold; IFPI AUT: 2× Platinum; IFPI SWI: 2× Platinum; MC: 4× Platinum; RMNZ: 4× Platinum; SNEP: Gold
A Thousand Suns	Released: September 14, 2010; Label: Warner Bros., Machine Shop; Formats: CD, LP, download	1	1	1	1	4	1	3	1	1	2	US: 906,000	RIAA: Platinum; ARIA: Platinum; BPI: Platinum; BVMI: 3× Gold; IFPI AUT: Gold; IFPI SWI: Gold; IRMA: Gold; MC: Platinum; RMNZ: Platinum; SNEP: Gold
Living Things	Released: June 26, 2012; Label: Warner Bros., Machine Shop; Formats: CD, LP, download	1	2	1	1	2	1	2	1	1	1	US: 681,000; UK: 220,637	RIAA: Platinum; ARIA: Gold; BPI: Gold; BVMI: 5× Gold; IFPI AUT: Platinum; IFPI SWI: Platinum; RMNZ: Platinum; SNEP: Platinum
The Hunting Party	Released: June 17, 2014; Label: Warner Bros., Machine Shop; Formats: CD, LP, download	3	3	2	3	3	1	6	2	1	2	US: 231,150	RIAA: Platinum; BPI: Gold; BVMI: Platinum; IFPI AUT: Gold; IFPI SWI: Gold; MC: Gold
One More Light	Released: May 19, 2017; Label: Warner Bros., Machine Shop; Formats: CD, LP, download	1	3	1	1	14	2	6	4	1	4	US: 1,000,000; UK: 164,656	RIAA: Gold; BPI: Gold; BVMI: Gold; IFPI AUT: Gold; RMNZ: Gold; SNEP: Gold
From Zero	Released: November 15, 2024; Label: Warner, Machine Shop; Formats: CD, cassette, LP, download	2	1	1	1	1	1	2	1	1	1	WW: 1,600,000; US: 397,000; UK: 58,933; FRA: 153,000	BPI: Gold; BVMI: 2× Platinum; IFPI AUT: Platinum; MC: Gold; RMNZ: Gold; SNEP: 2× Platinum

=== Live albums ===
List of live albums, with selected chart positions, sales figures and certifications
Title	Album details	Peak chart positions										Sales	Certifications
Title	Album details	US	AUS	AUT	CAN	FRA	GER	IRL	NZ	SWI	UK	Sales	Certifications
Live in Texas	Released: November 18, 2003; Label: Warner Bros., Machine Shop; Formats: CD+DVD, download	23	18	5	27	8	9	67	17	9	47	US: 1,100,000	RIAA: Platinum; ARIA: Gold; BPI: Gold; BVMI: 3× Gold; IFPI AUT: Gold; IFPI SWI: Gold; MC: Platinum; RMNZ: Gold; SNEP: Gold
Road to Revolution: Live at Milton Keynes	Released: November 21, 2008; Label: Warner Bros., Machine Shop; Formats: CD+DVD, BD, download	41	24	14	35	12	11	81	17	16	58	US: 230,000	ARIA: Gold; BPI: Silver; BVMI: Platinum; IFPI SWI: Gold; RMNZ: Gold
One More Light Live	Released: December 15, 2017; Label: Warner Bros., Machine Shop; Formats: CD, LP, download	28	20	11	29	54	7	—	32	7	32		
Unshatter Film Soundtrack (Live in São Paulo)	Released: September 25, 2026; Label: Warner Bros., Machine Shop; Formats: CD, LP, download	—	37	4	—	—	5	—	29	7	65		
"—" denotes a recording that did not chart or was not released in that territory.

=== Compilation albums ===
List of compilation albums, with selected chart positions, sales figures and certifications
Title	Album details	Peak chart positions										Sales	Certifications
Title	Album details	US	AUS	AUT	CAN	FRA	GER	IRL	NZ	SWI	UK	Sales	Certifications
A Decade Underground	Released: August 10, 2010; Label: Machine Shop; Formats: Download (Only for LP Underground Members)	—	—	—	—	—	—	—	—	—	—		
Studio Collection 2000–2012	Digital box set collection; Released: January 15, 2013; Label: Warner Bros.; Formats: Download	—	49	—	—	—	—	—	—	—	—		
Lost Demos	Vinyl set collection; Released: November 24, 2023; Label: Warner; Formats: LP	191	—	—	—	—	—	—	—	—	— (Note: Lost Demos did not enter the UK Albums Chart, but peaked at number 50 on the UK Albums Sales Chart.)		
Papercuts (Singles Collection 2000–2023)	Greatest hits album; Released: April 12, 2024; Label: Warner; Formats: CD, LP, cassette, download	6	7	3	8	2	2	16	2	5	4	UK: 148,740	BPI: 2× Platinum; RMNZ: 2× Platinum; SNEP: Platinum
"—" denotes a recording that did not chart or was not released in that territory.

=== Remix albums ===
List of remix albums, with selected chart positions, sales figures and certifications
Title	Album details	Peak chart positions										Sales	Certifications
Title	Album details	US	AUS	AUT	CAN	FRA	GER	IRL	NZ	SWI	UK	Sales	Certifications
Reanimation	Released: July 30, 2002; Label: Warner Bros.; Formats: CD, cassette, DVD-A, LP, download	2	16	2	8	11	3	4	8	3	3	US: 1,900,000+	RIAA: Platinum; ARIA: Gold; BPI: Platinum; BVMI: Gold; IFPI AUT: Gold; IFPI SWI: Gold; RMNZ: Gold
Recharged	Released: October 29, 2013; Label: Warner Bros.; Formats: CD, LP, download	10	7	9	9	19	4	41	9	6	12	US: 111,000	BVMI: Gold

=== Demo albums ===
List of demo albums, with selected details
Title	Album details
Xero	Released: 1997; Label: Self-released; Format: Cassette

=== Soundtrack albums ===
List of soundtrack albums, with selected chart positions
Title	Album details	Peak chart positions		
Title	Album details	US	FRA	GER
Transformers: Revenge of the Fallen – The Album	Released: June 23, 2009; Label: Warner Bros.; Formats: CD, download	49	167	55
Mall: Music from the Motion Picture (with Alec Puro)	Released: December 12, 2014; Label: Warner Bros., Machine Shop; Formats: CD, download	—	—	—
"—" denotes a recording that did not chart or was not released in that territory.

== Extended plays ==
List of extended plays, with selected chart positions, sales figures and certifications
Title	EP details	Peak chart positions										Sales	Certifications
Title	EP details	US	AUS	AUT	CAN	FRA	GER	IRL	NZ	SWI	UK	Sales	Certifications
Hybrid Theory EP (as Hybrid Theory)	Released: July, 1999; Label: Mix Media; Format: CD, download	—	—	—	—	—	—	—	—	—	—		
In the End: Live & Rare	Released: January 15, 2002; Label: Warner Bros.; Formats: CD	—	—	—	—	—	—	—	—	—	—		
Collision Course (with Jay-Z)	Released: November 30, 2004; Label: Warner Bros., Machine Shop, Roc-A-Fella, Def Jam; Formats: CD, cassette, LP, download	1	8	5	6	20	5	6	4	2	15	US: 1,934,000	RIAA: 2× Platinum; ARIA: Platinum; BPI: Platinum; BVMI: Platinum; IFPI AUT: Gold; IFPI SWI: Platinum; IRMA: 2× Platinum; MC: 2× Platinum; RMNZ: 2× Platinum; SNEP: Gold
iTunes Live from SoHo	Released: March 4, 2008; Label: Warner Bros.; Formats: Download	—	—	—	—	—	—	—	—	—	—		
Songs from the Underground	Released: November 28, 2008; Label: Warner Bros.; Formats: CD, download	96	—	56	—	—	42	—	—	10	—		
2011 North American Tour	Released: December 20, 2010; Label: Linkin Park; Formats: Download	—	—	—	—	—	—	—	—	—	—		
A Thousand Suns: Puerta de Alcalá	Released: January 25, 2011; Label: Warner Bros.; Formats: Download	122	—	—	—	—	—	—	—	—	—		
iTunes Festival: London 2011	Released: July 8, 2011; Label: Warner Bros.; Formats: Download	—	—	—	—	—	—	—	—	—	—		
Stagelight Demos	Released: November 9, 2012; Label: Open Labs; Formats: download	—	—	—	—	—	—	—	—	—	—		
A Light That Never Comes (Remixes) (with Steve Aoki)	Released: January 21, 2014; Label: Dim Mak; Formats: Download	—	—	—	—	—	—	—	—	—	—		
Darker Than Blood: Remixes – EP (with Steve Aoki)	Released: August 28, 2015; Label: Dim Mak; Formats: Download	—	—	—	—	—	—	—	—	—	—		
Evolution of Mike Shinoda – EP (with Mike Shinoda and Fort Minor)	Released: October 2, 2023; Label: Warner Records; Formats: Download	—	—	—	—	—	—	—	—	—	—		
"—" denotes a recording that did not chart or was not released in that territory.

=== LP Underground extended plays ===
List of extended plays released exclusive to LP Underground members, with selected chart positions, sales figures and certifications
Title	EP details	Peak chart positions		
Title	EP details	AUT	GER	SWI
Hybrid Theory EP (Reissue)	Released: November 19, 2001; Type: EP; Label: Machine Shop; Formats: CD, download	—	—	—
Underground 2.0	Released: November 18, 2002; Type: EP/Live; Label: Machine Shop; Formats: CD, download	—	—	—
Underground 3.0	Released: November 17, 2003; Type: EP/Live; Label: Machine Shop; Formats: CD, download	—	—	—
Underground 4.0	Released: November 22, 2004; Type: EP/Live; Label: Machine Shop; Formats: CD	—	—	—
Underground 5.0	Released: November 21, 2005; Type: EP/Live; Label: Machine Shop; Formats: CD, download	—	—	—
Underground 6	Released: December 5, 2006; Type: EP/Live; Label: Machine Shop; Formats: CD, download	—	—	—
LP Underground 7	Released: December 5, 2007; Type: EP/Live; Label: Warner Bros., Machine Shop; Formats: CD, download	—	—	—
mmm... Cookies: Sweet Hamster Like Jewels From America! (Underground 8.0)	Released: December 4, 2008; Type: EP; Label: Warner Bros.; Formats: CD, download	—	—	—
Underground 9.0: Demos	Released: December 3, 2009; Type: Demo; Label: Machine Shop; Formats: CD, LP, download	73	66	29
LP Underground X: Demos	Released: November 17, 2010; Type: Demo; Label: Machine Shop; Formats: CD, download	—	—	—
Underground 11	Released: November 15, 2011; Type: Demo; Label: Machine Shop; Formats: CD, download	—	—	—
Underground 12	Released: November 16, 2012; Type: Demo; Label: Machine Shop; Formats: CD, download	—	—	—
Underground XIII	Released: November 18, 2013; Type: Demo; Label: Machine Shop; Formats: CD, download	—	—	—
Underground XIV	Released: November 20, 2014; Type: Demo; Label: Machine Shop; Formats: CD, download	—	—	—
Underground 15	Released: November 25, 2015; Type: Demo; Label: Machine Shop; Formats: CD, download	—	—	—
Underground Sixteen	Released: November 22, 2016; Type: Demo; Label: Machine Shop; Formats: CD, download	—	—	—
"—" denotes a recording that did not chart or was not released in that territory.

== Video albums ==
Title	Album details	Certifications	Ref(s)
Frat Party at the Pankake Festival	Release: November 20, 2001; Label: Warner Bros., Machine Shop; Format: DVD, VHS	US: Platinum; AUS: Gold; UK: Gold	
