= Papercuts (Singles Collection 2000–2023) =

Greatest hits album by Linkin Park
- Released: April 12, 2024
- Recorded: 2000–2023
- Length: 67:56
- Labels: Warner; Machine Shop
- Producers: Don Gilmore; Linkin Park; Mike Shinoda; Rick Rubin; Brad Delson

Linkin Park chronology
Meteora 20th Anniversary Edition (2023)	Papercuts (Singles Collection 2000–2023) (2024)	From Zero (2024)

Singles from Papercuts
- 1. "Friendly Fire" Released: February 23, 2024; 2. "Qwerty" Released: April 26, 2024

Professional ratings
Review scores
Source	Rating
AllMusic	5/5 stars
Blabbermouth.net	10/10
Kerrang!	4/5
Metal Hammer	2.5/5 stars

Papercuts (Singles Collection 2000–2023), or simply Papercuts, is the first greatest hits album by American rock band Linkin Park. It was released on April 12, 2024, through Warner Records, following the Meteora 20th Anniversary Edition (2023).

On June 28, 2024, the instrumental version of the album was released with the same track listing.

== Background ==
The album spans the band's best-selling singles from 2000 to 2023 and was announced alongside the release of the song "Friendly Fire" on February 23, 2024, which appears as the final track and had been recorded during the One More Light (2017) sessions. Papercuts also includes the official release of the song "Qwerty", which first appeared on the band's 2006 fanclub-exclusive EP, LP Underground 6.0. It features material from six of Linkin Park's seven studio albums released during Bennington's lifetime; The Hunting Party (2014) did not feature any songs on the release.

== Track listing ==
All tracks are written by Linkin Park (Chester Bennington, Rob Bourdon, Brad Delson, Dave Farrell, Joe Hahn, Mike Shinoda), except where noted.

Papercuts (Singles Collection 2000–2023) track listing
No.	Title	Writer(s)	Original album	Length
1.	"Crawling"	Bennington; Bourdon; Delson; Hahn; Shinoda	Hybrid Theory (2000)	3:29
2.	"Faint"		Meteora (2003)	2:42
3.	"Numb/Encore"	Linkin Park; Shawn Carter; Kanye West	Collision Course (2004)	3:26
4.	"Papercut"	Bennington; Bourdon; Delson; Hahn; Shinoda	Hybrid Theory	3:06
5.	"Breaking the Habit"		Meteora	3:17
6.	"In the End"	Bennington; Bourdon; Delson; Hahn; Shinoda	Hybrid Theory	3:36
7.	"Bleed It Out"		Minutes to Midnight (2007)	2:44
8.	"Somewhere I Belong"		Meteora	3:34
9.	"Waiting for the End"		A Thousand Suns (2010)	3:51
10.	"Castle of Glass"		Living Things (2012)	3:25
11.	"One More Light"	Shinoda; Francis Anthony White	One More Light (2017)	4:15
12.	"Burn It Down"		Living Things	3:50
13.	"What I've Done"		Minutes to Midnight	3:27
14.	"Qwerty"		LP Underground 6.0 (2006)	3:21
15.	"One Step Closer"	Bennington; Bourdon; Delson; Hahn; Shinoda	Hybrid Theory	2:35
16.	"New Divide"		Transformers: Revenge of the Fallen – The Album (2009)	4:29
17.	"Leave Out All the Rest"		Minutes to Midnight	3:19
18.	"Lost"		Meteora20 (2023)	3:19
19.	"Numb"		Meteora	3:07
20.	"Friendly Fire"	Shinoda; Delson; Jon Green	Previously unreleased	2:56
Total length:				67:57

== Personnel ==
Linkin Park

- Chester Bennington – vocals
- Rob Bourdon – drums, percussion, backing vocals
- Brad Delson – lead guitar, backing vocals; bass guitar (tracks 1 and 6); string arrangements (track 17)
- Dave "Phoenix" Farrell – bass guitar, backing vocals
- Joe Hahn – turntables, synthesizers, samples, programming, backing vocals
- Mike Shinoda – vocals, rhythm guitar, keyboards, samples, synthesizers; string arrangements (tracks 2, 5, 17); strings and horns (track 10)

Additional musicians

- David Campbell – string arrangements (tracks 2, 5, 17)
- Joel Derouin – violin (tracks 2, 5)
- Charlie Bisharat – violin (tracks 2, 5, 17)
- Alyssa Park – violin (tracks 2, 5)
- Sara Parkins – violin (tracks 2, 5, 17)
- Michelle Richards – violin (tracks 2, 5)
- Mark Robertson – violin (tracks 2, 5)
- Evan Wilson – viola (tracks 2, 5)
- Bob Becker – viola (tracks 2, 5)
- Larry Corbett – cello (tracks 2, 5, 17)
- Dan Smith – cello (tracks 2, 5)
- Jay-Z – rap vocals (track 3)
- Ian Hornbeck – bass guitar (track 4)
- Francis "Eg" White – guitar and piano (track 11)
- Scott Koziol – bass guitar (track 15)
- Mario DeLeon – violin (track 17)
- Armen Garabedian – violin (track 17)
- Julia Hallmark – violin (track 17)
- Gerry Hilera – violin (track 17)
- Songa Lee-Kito – violin (track 17)
- Natalie Leggett – violin (track 17)
- Josefina Vergara – violin (track 17)
- Matt Funes – viola (track 17)
- Andrew Picken – viola (track 17)
- Suzie Katayama – cello (track 17)
- Oscar Hidaglo – double bass (track 17)
- Jon Green – additional guitar (track 20)

Production

- Don Gilmore – production (tracks 1, 2, 4–6, 8, 15, 18, 19), engineering (tracks 1, 4, 6, 15)
- Linkin Park – production (tracks 2, 5, 8, 18, 19)
- Mike Shinoda – production (tracks 3, 7, 9–14, 16, 17, 20), engineering (track 9, 10, 12, 16, 20), assistant Pro Tools (tracks 1, 4, 6, 15), additional mixing (track 16), Pro Tools editing (track 9)
- Rick Rubin – production (tracks 7, 9, 10, 12–14, 17)
- Brad Delson – production (tracks 11, 20), additional production (tracks 10, 12), additional Pro Tools editing (track 9)
- Andrew Dawson – co-production and additional programming (track 20)
- Jon Green – additional production (track 20)
- Corin Roddick – additional production and additional programming (track 20)
- John Ewing Jr. – engineering (tracks 2, 5, 8, 19), additional engineering & Pro Tools (tracks 1, 4, 6, 15)
- Andrew Scheps – engineering (tracks 7, 13, 14, 17)
- Ethan Mates – engineering (tracks 7, 9, 10, 12, 13, 16, 17, 20), mixing (track 14), additional mixing (track 16), Pro Tools editing (track 9)
- Dana Nielsen – engineering (tracks 7, 13, 17), additional engineering (track 14)
- Matt Griffin – assistant engineer (tracks 1, 4, 6, 15)
- Fox Phelps – assistant engineer (tracks 2, 5, 8, 19)
- Phillip Broussard Jr. – 2nd engineer (track 14), assistant engineer (tracks 7, 13, 17)
- Josh Newell – engineering (track 9), engineering assistant (track 16), Pro Tools editing (track 9)
- Andrew Hayes – assistant engineer and editor (tracks 10, 12)
- Andy Wallace – mixing (tracks 1, 2, 4–6, 8, 15, 19)
- Neal Avron – mixing (tracks 7, 9, 13, 17)
- D. Sardy – mixing (track 16)
- Manny Marroquin – mixing (tracks 10, 12, 18, 20)
- Steve Sisco – mix engineer (tracks 1, 2, 4–6, 8, 15, 19)
- Ryan Castle – mix engineer (track 16)
- George Gumbs – mix assistant (tracks 7, 13, 17)
- Nicolas Fournier – mix assistant (tracks 7, 9, 13, 17)
- Chris Galland – mix assistant (tracks 10, 12)
- Del Bowers – mix assistant (tracks 10, 12)
- Kiki Cholewka – mix engineering assistant (track 16)
- Erich Talaba – Pro Tools engineer (tracks 7, 13, 17)
- Brian "Big Bass" Gardner – mastering (tracks 1, 2, 4–6, 8, 10, 12, 14–16, 19, 20), digital editing (tracks 1, 2, 4–6, 8, 15, 19)
- Dave Collins – mastering (tracks 7, 13, 17)
- Vlado Meller – mastering (track 9)
- Chris Gehringer – mastering (track 11)
- Mark Santangelo – mastering assistant (track 9)

== Charts ==
=== Weekly charts ===
Weekly chart performance for Papercuts (Singles Collection 2000–2023)
Chart (2024)	Peak position
Australian Albums (ARIA)	7
Austrian Albums (Ö3 Austria)	3
Belgian Albums (Ultratop Flanders)	6
Belgian Albums (Ultratop Wallonia)	3
Canadian Albums (Billboard)	8
Croatian International Albums (HDU)	4
Dutch Albums (Album Top 100)	13
Finnish Albums (Suomen virallinen lista)	38
French Albums (SNEP)	2
German Albums (Offizielle Top 100)	2
Hungarian Albums (MAHASZ)	4
Irish Albums (Official Charts)	16
Italian Albums (FIMI)	11
Japanese Albums (Oricon)	16
Japanese Combined Albums (Oricon)	30
Japanese Rock Albums (Oricon)	2
Japanese Hot Albums (Billboard Japan)	11
New Zealand Albums (RMNZ)	2
Polish Albums (ZPAV)	14
Portuguese Albums (AFP)	3
Scottish Albums (Official Charts)	7
Spanish Albums (Promusicae)	17
Swedish Physical Albums (Sverigetopplistan)	10
Swiss Albums (Schweizer Hitparade)	5
UK Albums (Official Charts)	4
UK Rock & Metal Albums (Official Charts)	3
US Billboard 200	6
US Top Alternative Albums (Billboard)	2
US Top Hard Rock Albums (Billboard)	1
US Top Rock Albums (Billboard)	2

=== Monthly charts ===
Monthly chart performance for Papercuts (Singles Collection 2000–2023)
Chart (2024)	Position
Japanese Albums (Oricon)	37

=== Year-end charts ===
2024 year-end chart performance for Papercuts (Singles Collection 2000–2023)
Chart (2024)	Position
Australian Albums (ARIA)	33
Canadian Albums (Billboard)	83
Croatian International Albums (HDU)	33
French Albums (SNEP)	38
Italian Albums (FIMI)	61
New Zealand Albums (RMNZ)	14
UK Albums (OCC)	31
US Billboard 200	141
US Top Rock Albums (Billboard)	19
US Top Alternative Albums (Billboard)	13
US Top Hard Rock Albums (Billboard)	8

2025 year-end chart performance for Papercuts
Chart (2025)	Position
Australian Albums (ARIA)	35
French Albums (SNEP)	133
New Zealand Albums (RMNZ)	12
UK Albums (OCC)	23

== Certifications ==
Certifications for Papercuts (Singles Collection 2000–2023)
Region	Certification	Certified units/sales
France (SNEP)	Platinum	100,000^{‡}
Italy (FIMI)	2× Platinum	100,000^{‡}
New Zealand (RMNZ)	2× Platinum	30,000^{‡}
United Kingdom (BPI)	2× Platinum	600,000^{‡}
^{‡} Sales+streaming figures based on certification alone.
