= Chester Bennington =

American singer (1976–2017)

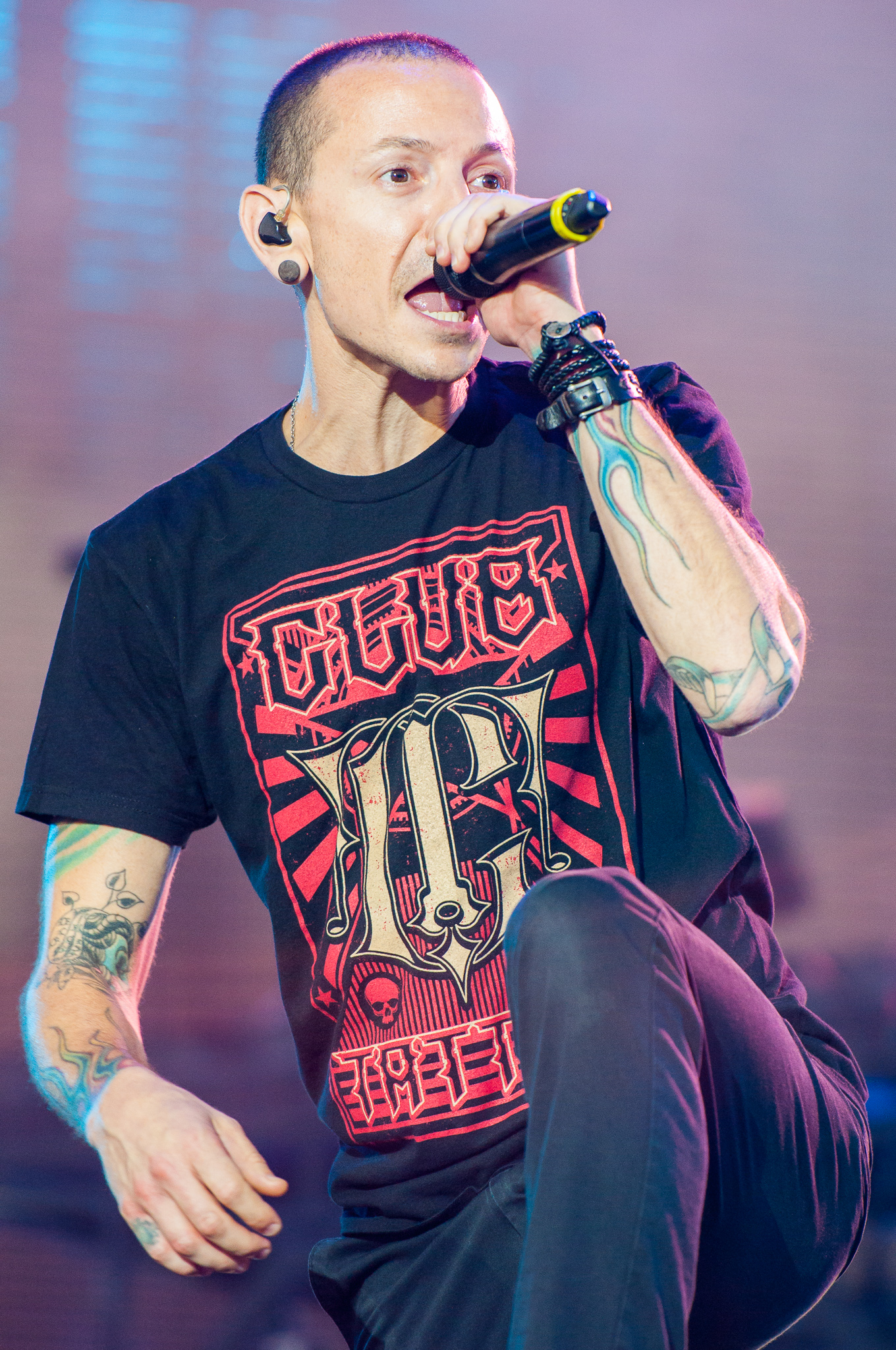
- Bennington performing in 2014
- Born: Chester Charles Bennington; March 20, 1976; Phoenix, Arizona, U.S.
- Died: July 20, 2017 (aged 41); Palos Verdes Estates, California, U.S.
- Occupations: Singer; songwriter; actor
- Years active: 1992–2017
- Spouses: Samantha Olit (m. 1996; div. 2005); Talinda Bentley (m. 2005)
- Children: 6
- Musical career
- Genres: Alternative metal; nu metal; hard rock; alternative rock; electronic rock; pop rock; grunge
- Instrument: Vocals
- Formerly of: Linkin Park; Dead by Sunrise; Grey Daze; Kings of Chaos; Stone Temple Pilots

Chester Charles Bennington (March 20, 1976 – July 20, 2017) was an American singer and songwriter. Bennington served as the lead vocalist of the American rock band Linkin Park. He was also the lead vocalist of Grey Daze, Dead by Sunrise, and Stone Temple Pilots at various points in his career.

Bennington first gained prominence as a vocalist following the release of Linkin Park's debut album, Hybrid Theory (2000), which was a worldwide commercial success. The album was certified Diamond by the Recording Industry Association of America in 2005, making it the bestselling debut album of the decade. He continued as the band's lead vocalist for their next six studio albums, from Meteora (2003) to One More Light (2017), with each charting within the top three spots of the Billboard 200.

Bennington formed his own band, Dead by Sunrise, as a side project in 2005. The band's debut album, Out of Ashes, was released on October 13, 2009. He became the lead singer of Stone Temple Pilots in 2013 to release the extended play record High Rise on October 8, 2013, via their own record label, Play Pen, but left in 2015 to focus solely on Linkin Park. As an actor, he appeared in films such as Crank (2006), Crank: High Voltage (2009), and Saw 3D (2010).

Bennington struggled with depression and substance abuse for most of his life, starting in his childhood. On July 20, 2017, he was found dead at his home in Palos Verdes Estates, California. The Los Angeles County Coroner concluded that his death was a result of suicide by hanging. Hit Parader magazine placed Bennington at number 46 on their list of the "Top 100 Metal Vocalists of All Time." Bennington has been ranked by several publications as one of the greatest rock vocalists of his generation. Writing for Billboard, Dan Weiss stated that Bennington "turned nu-metal universal".

== Early life ==
Chester Charles Bennington was born in Phoenix, Arizona, on March 20, 1976, to a mother who worked as a nurse and a father who investigated child sexual abuse cases as a police detective. He had two sisters and an older brother. Bennington took an interest in music at a young age, citing the bands Depeche Mode and Stone Temple Pilots as his earliest inspirations. He dreamed of becoming a member of Stone Temple Pilots, and later became their lead vocalist for a time. At age seven, an older male friend sexually abused him. Bennington was afraid to ask for help, not wanting people to think he was gay or a liar, and the abuse continued until age 13. Years later, he revealed the abuser's name to his father but chose not to press charges.

Bennington's parents divorced when he was 11 years old. The abuse and his situation at home affected him so much that he felt the urge to "kill everybody and run away". To comfort himself, Bennington drew pictures and wrote poetry and songs. After the divorce, his father gained custody of him. Bennington started using alcohol, marijuana, opium, cocaine, meth, and LSD. He was bullied in high school, stating in an interview that he was "knocked around like a rag doll at school, for being skinny and looking different". In 1993, at the age of 17, Bennington moved in with his mother. He was banned from leaving the house for a time when she discovered his drug use. He worked at a local Burger King before starting his career as a professional musician.

== Career ==
=== Early acts ===
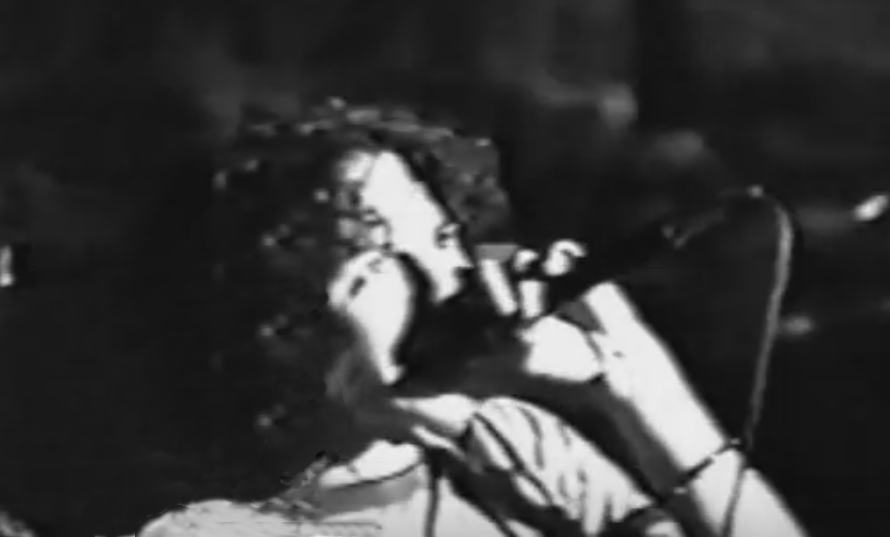
Bennington performing with Grey Daze in 1994

Bennington first began singing with a band called Sean Dowdell and His Friends?, and together they released an eponymous three-track cassette in 1993. Later, Dowdell and Bennington moved on to form a post-grunge band called Grey Daze. The band recorded a demo in 1993 and two albums: Wake Me in 1994, and ...No Sun Today in 1997. Bennington left Grey Daze in 1998.

=== Linkin Park ===
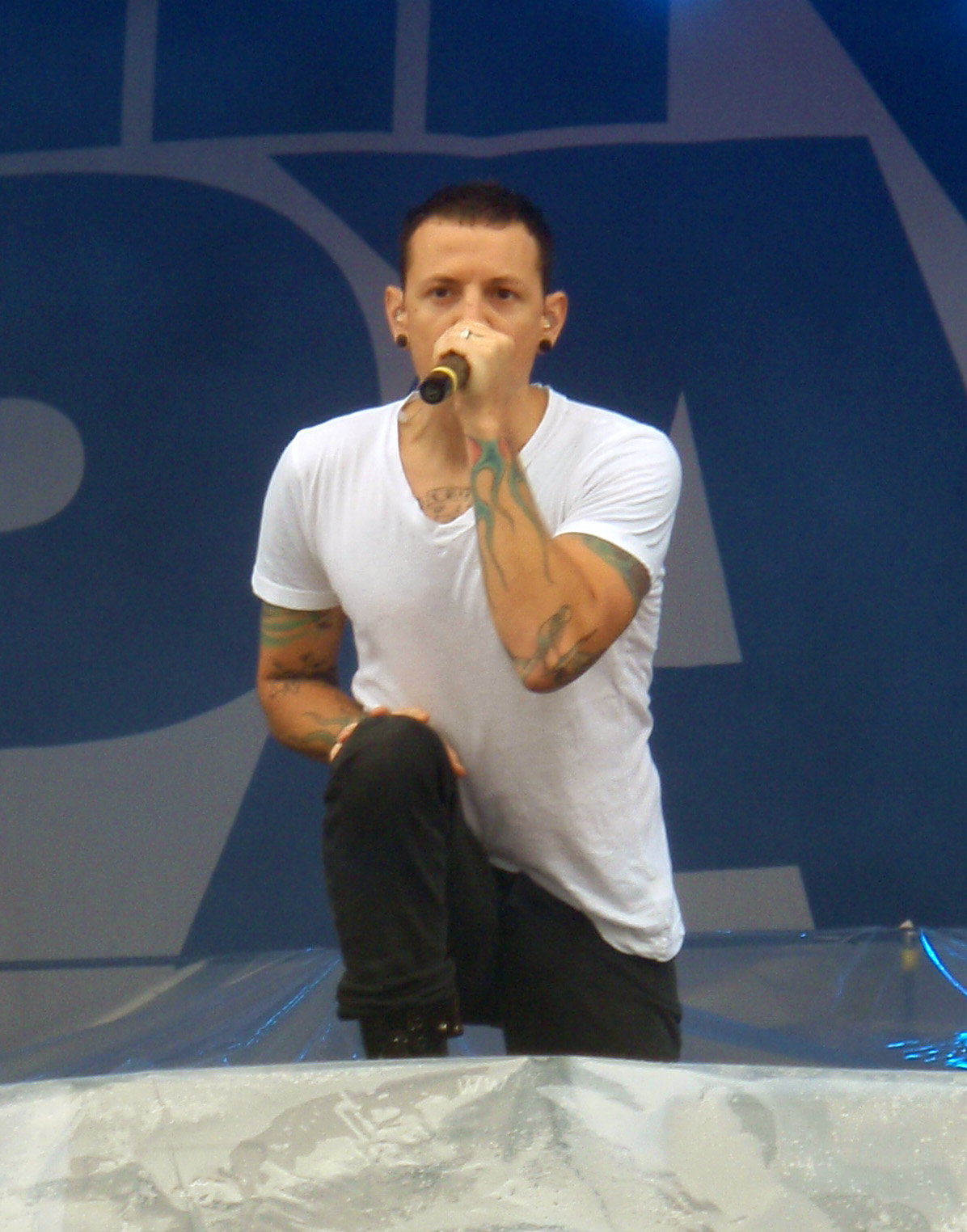
Bennington performing with Linkin Park at the 2009 Sonisphere Festival

Bennington had been frustrated and nearly quit his musical career altogether until Jeff Blue, the vice president of A&R at Zomba Music in Los Angeles, offered him an audition with the future members of Linkin Park (then known as Xero). He quit his day job at a digital services firm and traveled to California for the audition, in which he successfully won a place in the band. He left his own birthday party early to record his audition. Bennington and Mike Shinoda, the band's other vocalist, made significant progress together but failed to find a record deal and faced numerous rejections. Blue, who had since become vice president of A&R at Warner Records (then known as Warner Bros. Records), intervened again to help the band sign with the label.

On October 24, 2000, Linkin Park released their debut album, Hybrid Theory, through Warner Bros. Records. Bennington and Shinoda wrote the lyrics to Hybrid Theory based on some early material. Shinoda characterized the lyrics as interpretations of universal feelings, emotions, and experiences, and as "everyday emotions you talk about and think about". Bennington later described the songwriting experience to Rolling Stone magazine in early 2002, "It's easy to fall into that thing – 'poor, poor me', that's where songs like 'Crawling' come from: I can't take myself. But that song is about taking responsibility for your actions. I don't say 'you' at any point. It's about how I'm the reason that I feel this way. There's something inside me that pulls me down."

Bennington was Linkin Park's primary lead vocalist, but he occasionally shared the role with Shinoda. All Music Guide described Bennington's vocals as "higher-pitched" and "emotional", in contrast to Shinoda's hip-hop-style delivery. Both members also worked together to write lyrics for the band's songs.

Hybrid Theory (2000) was certified diamond by the RIAA in 2005. The band's second album, Meteora (2003), reached number one on the Billboard 200 album chart, as did its third album, Minutes to Midnight (2007). Linkin Park has sold more than 70 million albums and 30 million singles worldwide. In 2003, MTV2 named Linkin Park the sixth-greatest band of the music video era and the third-best of the new millennium. Billboard ranked Linkin Park No. 19 on the Best Artists of the Decade chart. In 2012, the band was voted as the greatest artist of the 2000s in a Bracket Madness poll on VH1.

=== Dead by Sunrise ===
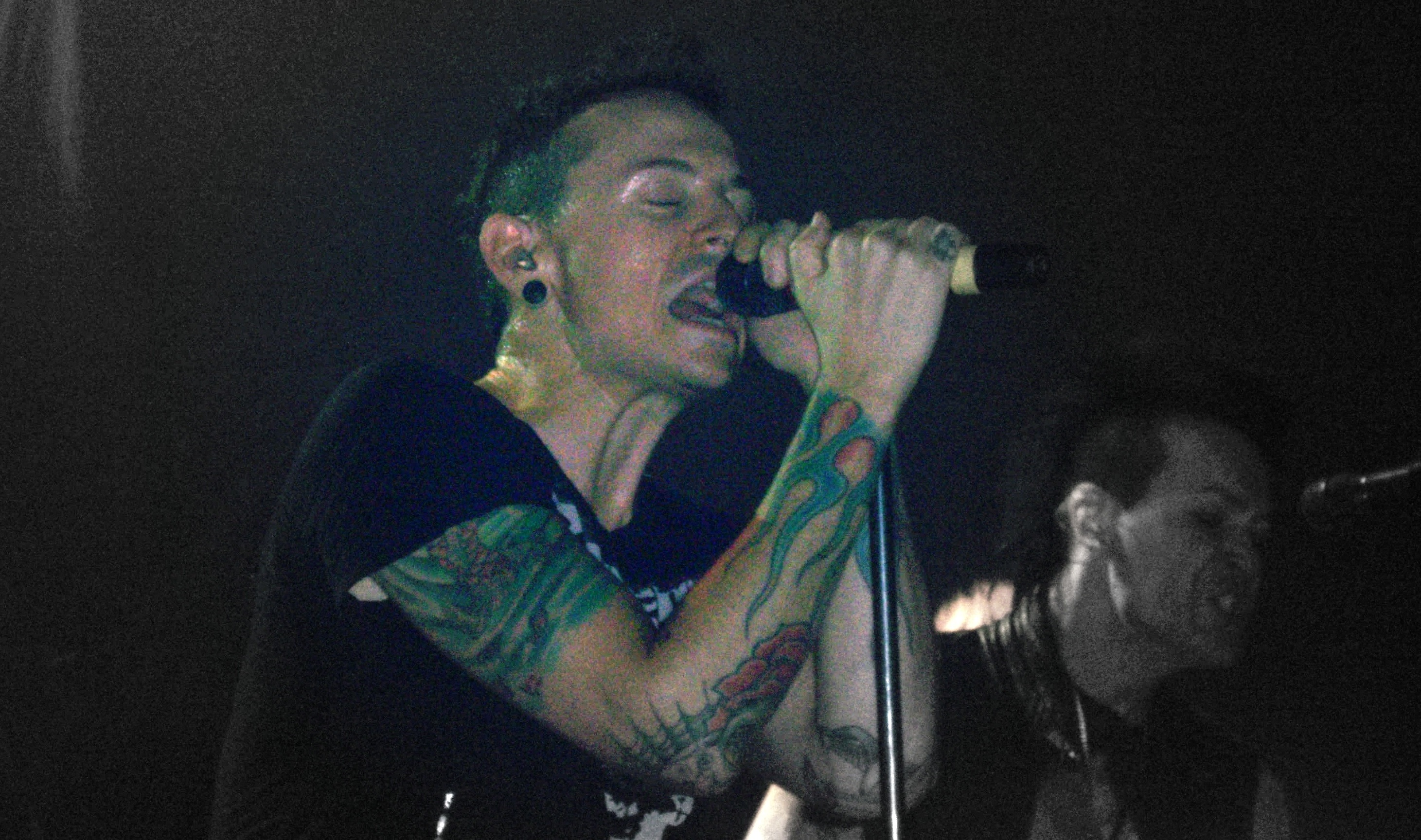
Bennington performing with Dead by Sunrise in 2009

In 2005, Bennington co-founded Dead by Sunrise, an electronic rock band from Los Angeles, California, with Orgy and Julien-K members Amir Derakh and Ryan Shuck. Dead by Sunrise made their live debut in May 2008, performing at the 13th anniversary party for Club Tattoo in Tempe, Arizona.

The band released their lone album, Out of Ashes, on October 13, 2009.

=== Stone Temple Pilots ===
In February 2013, Stone Temple Pilots parted ways with long-time lead singer Scott Weiland. The band recruited Bennington to replace Weiland in May 2013. On May 18, 2013, Bennington took the stage at KROQ's Weenie Roast with the band. The setlist included original Stone Temple Pilots songs, as well as their first single with Bennington on vocals called "Out of Time", which debuted on May 19 and was available for free download via their official website. It was later announced by Bennington and the band in an exclusive KROQ interview that he was officially the new frontman of Stone Temple Pilots and discussed the possibility of a new album and tour. The song "Out of Time" is featured on their EP High Rise, which was released on October 8, 2013.

Bennington reflected on joining Stone Temple Pilots, stating, "Every band has its own kind of vibe. Stone Temple Pilots has this sexier, more classic rock feel to it. Linkin Park is a very modern, very tech-heavy type of band. I grew up listening to these guys. When this opportunity came up, it was just like a no-brainer." Bennington stated in interviews that singing lead vocals in Stone Temple Pilots was his lifelong dream. He left the band on good terms due to his commitments with Linkin Park in 2015 and was replaced two years later by Jeff Gutt.

=== Other works ===
In 2005, Bennington appeared on "Walking Dead", the lead single from turntablist Z-Trip's debut album Shifting Gears. Bennington also made a surprise guest appearance during Z-Trip's performance at the Coachella Valley Music and Arts Festival in 2005. Bennington re-recorded the Mötley Crüe song "Home Sweet Home" as a duet with the band as a charity single for the victims of Hurricane Katrina in the fall of 2005. He also joined Alice in Chains and performed the song "Man in the Box" at KROQ's Inland Invasion Festival in 2006. Bennington performed with Kings of Chaos during their six-show 2016 concert tour.

In 2007, he was featured on Young Buck's song "Slow Ya Roll" from his Buck The World album. Bennington recorded a track for Slash's 2010 eponymous debut solo album entitled "Crazy" but it was blocked from release due to his commitments to Linkin Park with Slash stating that the band "wasn't having it". Slash rerecorded it with Lemmy on vocals and the retitled "Doctor Alibi" was added instead. In May 2021, a snippet of the original Bennington track was finally released.

== Musical style and influences ==
Bennington was described as being a "warm tenor", with his voice showing "tremendous durability" for the entirety of his career. Althea Legaspi of Rolling Stone wrote, "Bennington's voice embodied the anguish and wide-ranging emotions of the lyrics, from capturing life's vulnerable moments to the fury and catharsis found in his belted screams, which he would often move between at the turn of a dime."

Bennington stated that he was influenced by Stone Temple Pilots, Alice in Chains, Arcade Fire, Circle Jerks, Descendents, Deftones, Jane's Addiction, Metallica, Fugazi, Refused, Ministry, Minor Threat, Misfits, the Naked and Famous, Nine Inch Nails, Nirvana, Pearl Jam, Skinny Puppy, Soundgarden, and A Tribe Called Quest. Bennington also considered himself as "a huge Madonna fan", crediting her for making him grow up wanting to be a musician.

== Personal life ==
=== Family and views ===
Bennington had a son, born in 1996, from his relationship with Elka Brand. In 2006, he adopted Brand's other son who was born in 1997. He married his first wife, Samantha Marie Olit, on October 31, 1996. They had one child together, born in 2002, who later came out as transgender in 2024. Bennington's relationship with his first wife declined during his early years with Linkin Park, and they divorced in 2005.

In 2005, he married Talinda Ann Bentley, a former Playboy model with whom he had three children, the first born in 2006, and then twins, born in 2011. Chester and Talinda Bennington were harassed by a cyberstalker, who was later found guilty in 2008 of tampering with the couple's email and other personal information, as well as sending threatening messages, and was sentenced to two years in prison.

Bennington was a tattoo enthusiast. He had done work and promotions with Club Tattoo, a tattoo parlor in Tempe, Arizona. Club Tattoo is owned by Sean Dowdell, Bennington's friend since high school with whom he played in two bands.

Bennington was an avid sports fan and supported NBA team Phoenix Suns, NFL's Arizona Cardinals, MLB's Arizona Diamondbacks, NHL's Arizona Coyotes, and English soccer team Ipswich Town.

In a January 2011 interview, in response to the 2011 Tucson shooting, Bennington said, "There's a non-violent way to express yourself and get your point across – regardless of what you're saying or what your point is. In a free society, people have a right to believe whatever they want to believe. That's their business and they can speak their mind. But nobody, even in a free society, has the right to take another person's life. Ever. That's something that we really need to move beyond."

Bennington was a critic of U.S. president Donald Trump. On January 29, 2017, he tweeted that Trump was "a greater threat to the USA than terrorism". This tweet resurfaced in July 2020 after Linkin Park sent Trump a cease and desist order for using "In the End" in an ad for his re-election campaign that year.

=== Health and injuries ===
Bennington was plagued with poor health during the making of Meteora, and struggled to attend some of the album's recording sessions. In the summer of 2003, he began to suffer from extreme abdominal pain and gastrointestinal issues while filming the music video for "Numb" in Prague. He was forced to return to the United States for surgery, and filmed the remainder of the music video in Los Angeles.

While touring for Minutes to Midnight, Bennington sustained a wrist injury in October 2007 while attempting to jump off a platform during a show in Melbourne at the Rod Laver Arena. Despite the injury, he continued to perform the entire show with a broken wrist, before heading to an emergency department after the show. Bennington fell ill on the U.S. arena tour for Minutes To Midnight in late February 2008, which resulted in having to cancel a couple of shows.

In 2011, Bennington fell ill again, and Linkin Park was forced to cancel three shows and reschedule two from the A Thousand Suns World Tour. He injured his shoulder during the band's tour in Asia and was advised by doctors to have immediate surgery, canceling their final show at Pensacola Beach, Florida, and ending their tour.

Bennington struggled with depression, anxiety and substance abuse. He overcame his drug addiction and denounced drug use in later interviews. He battled with alcoholism during his tenure with Linkin Park, which he overcame following an intervention from his bandmates. In July 2006, he said he had quit drinking, noting: "I just don't want to be that person anymore." However, Bennington suffered several relapses, once in 2007 and once in 2008. In late 2015, he had started drinking again. He went back to treatment, but suffered a 3 day relapse in the summer of 2016.

Bennington injured his ankle in January 2015 during a basketball game. He attempted to cope with the injury and perform with the aid of crutches and a knee scooter. Linkin Park later canceled the remainder of their tour to allow Bennington to undergo surgery and recover.

=== Friendship with Chris Cornell ===
Bennington was a close friend of Chris Cornell. They became friends during a tour they shared in the mid-2000s. The chemistry between the two strengthened during the 2007–2008 Projekt Revolution Tour when Bennington joined Cornell on stage to sing Temple of the Dog's "Hunger Strike", and then Cornell joined Linkin Park to sing "Crawling". Bennington was also the godfather of Cornell's son Christopher.

Following Cornell's suicide in May 2017, Bennington wrote an open letter to him on Instagram, stating that he could not imagine a world without Cornell in it. Shinoda noted that Bennington was very emotional when the band performed "One More Light" in Cornell's honor on Jimmy Kimmel Live!, and Bennington could not finish singing the song during rehearsal due to this. The band was due to record a live performance of their single "Heavy" on the show, but Bennington decided instead to play "One More Light" after hearing the news about Cornell's death.

On May 26, 2017, a week after his Kimmel performance, Bennington sang Leonard Cohen's song "Hallelujah" at Cornell's funeral in Los Angeles with Brad Delson on guitar.

== Death ==
On July 20, 2017, at the age of 41, Bennington was found dead at his home in Palos Verdes Estates, California. Authorities ruled his death as suicide by hanging. No suicide note was left and toxicology reports only found a trace amount of alcohol in his system.

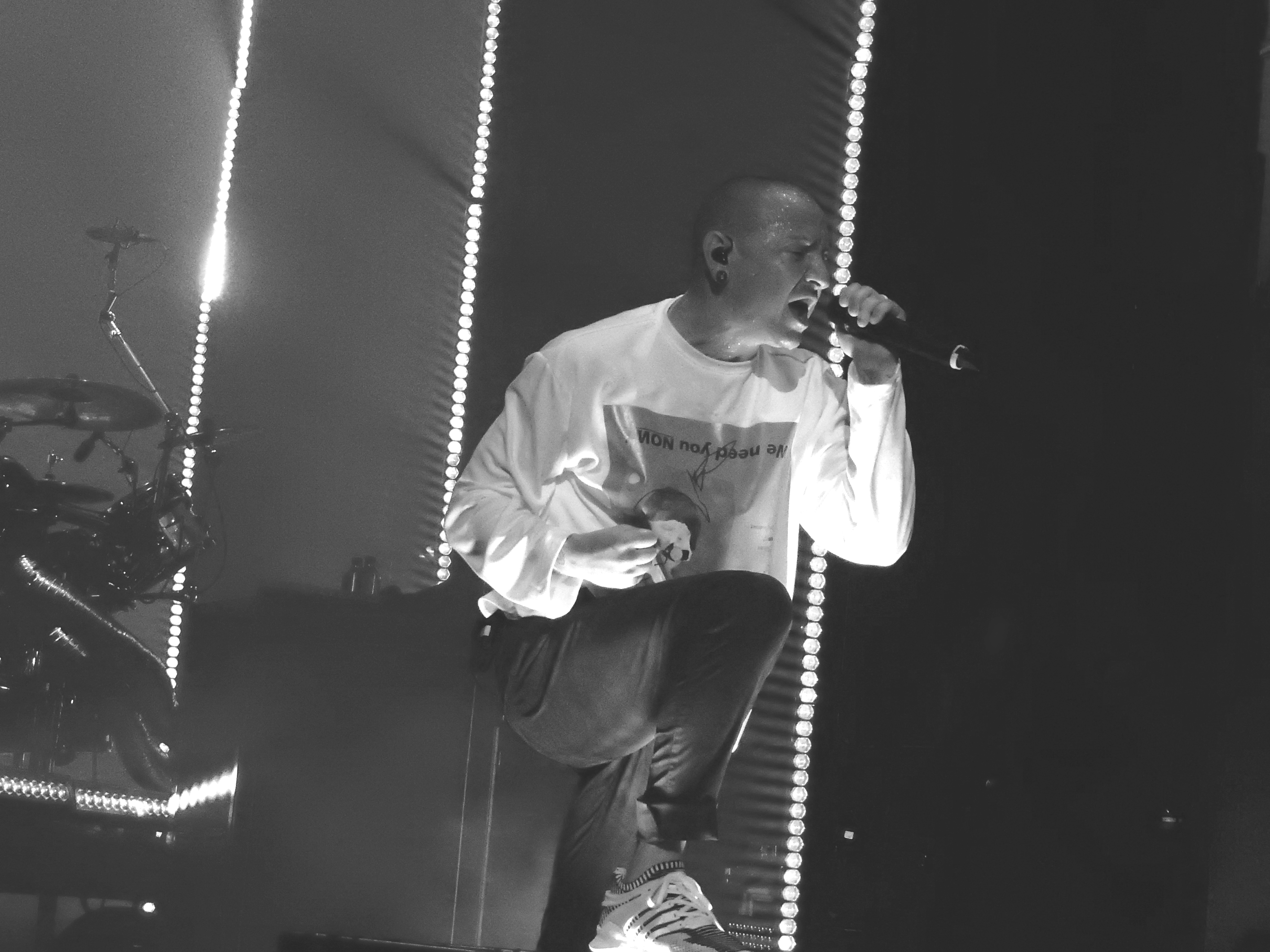
Bennington performing on July 4, 2017, sixteen days before his death

After Bennington's death, Linkin Park canceled the rest of their One More Light World Tour and refunded tickets. Bennington's funeral was held on July 29 at South Coast Botanic Garden in Palos Verdes. In addition to his family members and close friends, many musicians who toured or played with Linkin Park also attended. The service also included a full stage for musical tributes.

=== Remembrances and tributes ===
Bennington filmed an episode of Carpool Karaoke: The Series six days before his death. Bennington's family allowed the episode to be aired on October 12, 2017. On August 27, during the 2017 MTV Video Music Awards ceremony, Jared Leto received media attention for his tribute to Bennington and Chris Cornell. Some of his former bandmates from Dead by Sunrise and Grey Daze united to perform a tribute for Bennington during a concert on September 2 in Las Vegas. Linkin Park also hosted a public tribute for Bennington in Los Angeles on October 27, titled Linkin Park and Friends: Celebrate Life in Honor of Chester Bennington. The event featured the band's first performance following his death, along with performances from Blink-182, members of System of a Down, Korn, Avenged Sevenfold, Bring Me the Horizon, Sum 41, Yellowcard, and the singer Kiiara, among others.

Rapper Jay-Z paid tribute to Bennington on several occasions by performing "Numb/Encore" live. Jay-Z and Bennington (with Linkin Park) collaborated on the song. Coldplay's Chris Martin paid tribute to Bennington during the band's North American tour concert at MetLife Stadium, playing an acoustic version of "Crawling" on piano. Several other artists, including Muse, Ryan Key (lead vocalist and guitarist of Yellowcard), Machine Gun Kelly, Imagine Dragons, Billy Talent and Godsmack, also either covered Linkin Park songs (usually "Crawling") or played their own songs during concerts as tribute to Bennington in the days and months following his death. During the 60th Annual Grammy Awards's annual in memoriam tribute, rapper Logic performed the song "1-800-273-8255" live alongside Alessia Cara and Khalid as a tribute to both Cornell and Bennington. The song's title was, at the time, the phone number of the 988 Suicide & Crisis Lifeline.

Producer Markus Schulz made a trance remix of the Linkin Park song "In the End" as tribute to Bennington after his death, which he debuted at Tomorrowland.

Bennington and other late musicians were honored in the music video for "Hold on to Memories" by Disturbed.

Following Bennington's death, Limp Bizkit singer Fred Durst said that Bennington "had a way of making anyone he spoke to feel heard, understood and significant. His aura and spirit were contagious and empowering. Often those types of people have so much pain and torture inside that the last thing they want is to contaminate or break the spirit of others... As real and transparent as our conversations would be, he was always the one projecting light on the shadows."

=== Aftermath ===
Linkin Park went on hiatus following Bennington's death in 2017, during which the band did not tour or work on new music. The band instead released 20th-anniversary reissues of Hybrid Theory (2020) and Meteora (2023), along with Papercuts (2024), a greatest hits album. On September 5, 2024, Linkin Park announced they would reunite after a seven-year hiatus to release a new album, From Zero, which was released November 15, 2024. It was supported by a six-date international tour. The band also introduced two new members, new co-lead vocalist Emily Armstrong (succeeding Bennington) and new drummer Colin Brittain (in place of Rob Bourdon, who had left the band during the hiatus and declined to return).

== Legacy ==
Several publications have commented on the musical legacy Bennington left behind. While describing the success of Bennington and Linkin Park, AllMusic's Andrew Leahey said, "Although rooted in alternative metal, Linkin Park became one of the most successful acts of the 2000s by welcoming elements of hip-hop, modern rock, and atmospheric electronica into their music ...focusing as much on the vocal interplay between singer Chester Bennington and rapper Mike Shinoda." Writing for Billboard, Dan Weiss stated that Bennington "turned nu-metal universal", as he was "clearly an important conduit for his far-ranging audience".

Fred Durst stated that if it were not for Bennington's voice and his words, nu metal "would never have reached the masses and affected so many lives".

The New York Times' Jon Caramanica commented that Bennington's ability to "pair serrated rawness with sleek melody" separated him from other contemporary singers, and also from the artists he was influenced by. Caramanica noted, "He was an emo sympathizer in a time when heavy metal was still setting the agenda for mainstream hard rock, and a hip-hop enthusiast who found ways to make hip-hop-informed music that benefited from his very un-hip-hop skill set." As Bennington acquired influences from industrial and hardcore punk acts, the journalist believed this was the factor that made Linkin Park survive the "rise and precipitous fall of the rap-rock era", calling the musician "a rock music polymath". Mikael Wood of the Los Angeles Times argued, "Perhaps more than Linkin Park's influential sound, Bennington's real artistic legacy will be the message he put across – the reassurance he offered from the dark."

BBC's Steve Holden called Bennington the "voice of a generation", saying his voice was arguably Linkin Park's greatest asset. Jonathan McAloon of The Daily Telegraph commented, "Bennington's death will have an impact on many millennials because his voice was the sound of their millennium." While talking about Linkin Park's popularity, Corey Apar, of AllMusic, commented, "Bennington's oft-tortured vocals became one of the most distinctive in the alternative rock scene." Writing for the Guardian, Ben Beaumont-Thomas noted, "Bennington's decision to sing clearly and openly was, therefore, more radical than he is given credit for, and indeed more socially valuable." The journalist continued to discuss Bennington's impact, commenting,

His cleanly articulated tales of emotional struggle gave millions the sense that someone understood them, and the huge sound of his band around him magnified that sense, moving listeners from the psychic space of their bedrooms into an arena of thousands of people who shared their pain.

James Hingle echoed this sentiment, writing for Kerrang!, "[Bennington] was one of the most honest vocalists out there when it came to his mental health". In the same topic, William Goodman from Billboard said Bennington and fellow musicians Chris Cornell and Scott Weiland "helped define a generation of the hard rock sound, who were tied together artistically and personally".

The Straits Times' music correspondent Eddino Abdul Hadi stated Bennington was an inspiration to many artists in the Singapore music scene. Calum Slingerland, editor of the Canadian periodical Exclaim!, expressed, "[H]is influence has been felt in the worlds of rock, metal, rap, and beyond."

After Bennington's death, his widow Talinda Bennington launched a campaign called 320 Changes Direction in honor of her husband to help break the stigma surrounding mental illness.

In 2020, during a Twitch live-stream, Mike Shinoda confirmed the existence of an unreleased Linkin Park song, titled "Friendly Fire", which features vocal tracks Bennington recorded during the One More Light sessions. The song was released on February 23, 2024. At the time of his death, Bennington just finished a collaboration with Lamb of God guitarist Mark Morton for Morton's solo album Anesthetic entitled "Cross Off"; Morton later said in interviews that Bennington was "very, very excited about the idea of screaming and doing something heavier than what he's been doing lately". The music video for "Cross Off" later featured an empty microphone as a tribute to Bennington.

During an interview with Zane Lowe in 2024, Bennington's successor in Linkin Park, Emily Armstrong, called the band's debut album Hybrid Theory her favorite album and specifically cited Bennington's performance in the song "One Step Closer" as her inspiration to be a singer, commenting, "That was the moment I was like, 'I want to sing and scream', you know? 'One Step Closer', I was like, 'I could do that'. At the time I wasn't even a good singer. I was a guitar player in a band, you know? . . . And obviously, on the side of the feelings and the emotions of it, like, I would love to do him proud."

In 2025, Stephen Andrew Galiher of Vice included him in his list of "4 Metal Vocalists Who Mastered Both Screaming and Singing".

== Discography ==
=== With Linkin Park ===
- Hybrid Theory (2000)
- Meteora (2003)
- Minutes to Midnight (2007)
- A Thousand Suns (2010)
- Living Things (2012)
- The Hunting Party (2014)
- One More Light (2017)

=== With Grey Daze ===
Album	Album details	Peak chart positions						
Album	Album details	AUS	AUT	GER	SWI	UK	UK Rock	US
Wake Me	Released: October 1994; Formats: CD	—	—	—	—	—	—	—
...No Sun Today	Released: May 23, 1997; Formats: CD	—	—	—	—	—	—	—
Amends	Released: June 26, 2020; Formats: CD, LP, download, streaming	30	29	9	17	62	1	75
The Phoenix	Release: June 17, 2022; Format: CD, LP, download, streaming	—	—	27	87	—	—	—
"—" denotes a recording that did not chart or was not released in that territory.

==== Singles ====
Title	Year	Peak chart positions			Album
Title	Year	US Main.	US Rock	US Rock Air.	Album
"What's In the Eye?"	2020	—	—	—	Amends
"Sickness"	2020	2	35	11	Amends
"Sometimes"	2020	—	—	—	Amends
"Soul Song"	2020	—	40	—	Amends
"B12"	2020	29	—	—	Amends
"Anything, Anything"	2021	—	—	—	The Phoenix
"Saturation (Strange Love)"	2022	—	—	—	The Phoenix
"Starting to Fly"	2022	—	—	—	The Phoenix
"Drag"	2022	—	—	—	The Phoenix

==== Music videos ====
Year	Title	Director	Album
2020	"What's in the Eye"	Zev Deans	Amends
2020	"Sickness"	Nico Poalillo and Brandon Rottman	Amends
2020	"Soul Song"	Jaime Bennington	Amends
2020	"B12"	Unknown	Amends
2020	"In Time"	Daniel Silva and Danilo Silgepe	Amends
2020	"Shouting Out"	Daniel Silva and Danilo Silgepe	Amends
2022	"Saturation (Strange Love)"	Marc Silverstein	The Phoenix
2022	"Starting to Fly"	Heidi Gadd	The Phoenix
2022	"Drag"	Heidi Gadd	The Phoenix

=== With Dead by Sunrise ===
- Out of Ashes (2009)

=== With Stone Temple Pilots ===
- High Rise (2013)

=== Album contributions and singles ===
Year	Artist	Song	Release
2001	DJ Lethal	"Cry To Yourself"	N/A – originally intended for DJ Lethal's unreleased album "State of the Art"
2002	Stone Temple Pilots	"Wonderful (Live)"	The Family Values 2001 Tour
2002	Chester Bennington	"System"	Queen of the Damned soundtrack
2002	Cyclefly	"Karma Killer"	Crave
2004	Handsome Boy Modeling School featuring DJ Q-bert, Grand Wizard Theodore, Jazzy Jay, Lord Finesse, Mike Shinoda, Rahzel & Chester Bennington / Tim Meadows	"Rock N' Roll (Could Never Hip Hop Like This) (Part 2) / Knockers"	White People
2005	Z-Trip	"Walking Dead"	Shifting Gears
2005	Mötley Crüe	"Home Sweet Home" (remake)	Non-album charity single
2006	Chester Bennington	"Morning After (Julien-K Remix)"	Underworld: Evolution (soundtrack)
2006	Mindless Self Indulgence	"What Do They Know? (Mindless Self Indulgence Vs. Julien-K & Chester Bennington Remix)"	Another Mindless Rip Off
2007	Young Buck	"Slow Ya Roll"	Buck the World
2008/2010	Chris Cornell	"Hunger Strike (Live at Projekt Revolution 2008)"	Songs from the Underground A Decade Underground
2010	Santana featuring Chester Bennington & Ray Manzarek	"Riders on the Storm" (The Doors cover)	Guitar Heaven: The Greatest Guitar Classics of All Time
2019	Mark Morton featuring Chester Bennington	"Cross Off"	Anesthetic

=== Music producer ===
Bennington executive-produced the 2012 debut EP Us–You for Los Angeles hard rock band Hellflower, which is fronted by his long-time friend and Director of Activities (D.O.A.) Church. Bennington also served as Executive Producer on Julien-K’s debut album ‘’Death To Analog’’, which was released in 2009.

== Filmography ==
Bennington made a cameo appearance in the 2006 film Crank as a customer in a pharmacy. He later appeared as a horse-track spectator in the film's 2009 sequel, Crank: High Voltage. Bennington also played the role of the ill-fated racist Evan in the 2010 film Saw 3D. He was one of several rock musicians who spoke about the industry in Jared Leto's 2012 documentary, Artifact.

Bennington was working with Church on developing an upcoming television show, Mayor of the World, with executive producer Trip Taylor. Bennington also appeared on the pilot episode of the series My Dad Rocks which featured rockstar Dad's.

Year	Title	Role	Notes
2006	Crank	Pharmacy Stoner	
2009	Crank: High Voltage	Hollywood Park Guy	
2010	Saw 3D	Evan	
2026	Linkin Park: Unshatter	Himself (archive footage)	
