= Kuerti =

Kuerti, also spelled Kürti and Kurti, is a surname of Hungarian origin. Notable people with the surname include:

- Anton Kuerti, Austrian-born Canadian conductor
- Julian Kuerti, Canadian conductor, son of Anton
- Miklos Kuerti, physicist
