= Hunger Strike (song) =

1991 single by Temple of the Dog

Single by Temple of the Dog

from the album Temple of the Dog
- B-side: "Your Saviour" "All Night Thing"
- Released: June 1992 (US promo); October 12, 1992 (UK)
- Recorded: November–December 1990
- Studio: London Bridge Studios, Seattle, Washington
- Genre: Grunge
- Length: 4:03
- Label: A&M
- Songwriter: Chris Cornell
- Producers: Rick Parashar, Temple of the Dog

Temple of the Dog singles chronology
| "Hunger Strike" (1992) | "Say Hello 2 Heaven" (1992) |

"Hunger Strike" is a song by the American rock band Temple of the Dog. Written by vocalist Chris Cornell, it was released in 1992 as the first single from the band's sole studio album, Temple of the Dog (1991). It was the band's most successful song, peaking at number four on the Billboard Mainstream Rock Tracks chart.

== Origin and recording ==
"Hunger Strike" was written by vocalist Chris Cornell. It features a duet between Cornell and vocalist Eddie Vedder. Cornell was having trouble with the vocals at practice, when Vedder stepped in. Cornell later said "he sang half of that song not even knowing that I'd wanted the part to be there and he sang it exactly the way I was thinking about doing it, just instinctively." "Hunger Strike" became Temple of the Dog's breakout single; it was also Vedder's first featured vocal on a record.

Cornell on the song:

When we started rehearsing the songs, I had pulled out "Hunger Strike" and I had this feeling it was just kind of gonna be filler, it didn't feel like a real song. Eddie was sitting there kind of waiting for a (Mookie Blaylock) rehearsal and I was singing parts, and he kind of humbly—but with some balls—walked up to the mic and started singing the low parts for me because he saw it was kind of hard. We got through a couple choruses of him doing that and suddenly the light bulb came on in my head, this guy's voice is amazing for these low parts. History wrote itself after that, that became the single.

Guitarist Mike McCready on the song:

I remember thinking that this was a really beautiful song when I heard it. Chris Cornell (Soundgarden) showed me the riff. I had a '62 reissue Strat and I wanted to use the fourth-position tone setting—between the bridge and middle pickups—for the beginning of the song because I like that softer sound. Then I kicked it to the front pickup for the heavier part of the song. This is one of many amazing songs written by Chris.

Eddie Vedder on the song:

It was during that same week that I was up there [In Seattle rehearsing with Pearl Jam]. Day four maybe, or day five, they did a Temple [of the Dog] rehearsal after our afternoon rehearsal. I got to watch these songs, and watch how Chris [Cornell] was working, and watch Matt [Cameron] play drums. It got to "Hunger Strike" — I was sitting in the corner, putting duct tape on a little African drum. About two-thirds of the way through, he was having to cut off the one line, and start the other. I'm not now, and certainly wasn't then, self-assured or cocky, but I could hear what he was trying to do, so I walked up to the mic — which I'm really surprised I did — and sang the other part, "Going hungry, going hungry." The next time I was up, he asked if I'd record it — so it was just me and Chris in the same studio that we made [1991's] Ten record. I really like hearing that song. I feel like I could be real proud of it — because one, I didn't write it, and two, it was such a nice way to be ushered onto vinyl for the first time. I'm indebted to Chris time eternal for being invited onto that track.

That was the first time I heard myself on a real record. It could be one of my favorite songs that I’ve ever been on — or the most meaningful.

== Release and reception ==
In the summer of 1992, the album received new attention. Although it had been released more than a year earlier, A&M Records realized that they had in their catalog what was essentially a collaboration between Soundgarden and Pearl Jam, who had both risen to mainstream attention in the months since the album's release with their respective albums, Badmotorfinger and Ten. A&M decided to reissue the album and promote "Hunger Strike" as a single. "Hunger Strike" became the most successful song from Temple of the Dog on the American rock charts. The song peaked at number four on the Billboard Mainstream Rock Tracks chart and number seven on the Billboard Modern Rock Tracks chart. Jim Guerinot, A&M's senior VP of marketing at the time, said, "I don't think that anyone would have paid attention if 'Hunger Strike' wasn't a great song." Outside the United States, the single was released in Australia, Canada, Germany, and the United Kingdom. In Canada, the song reached the top 50 on the Canadian Singles Chart. "Hunger Strike" reached the top 60 in the UK.

David Fricke of Rolling Stone said, "Cornell and Vedder . . . turn its four minutes into a veritable opera of rock-star guilt. . . . Cornell turns on the Robert Plant-style napalm full blast, but it is Vedder's scorched introspection that brings the conscience in the song to a full boil. 'Hunger Strike' was his first starring vocal on record; it is still one of his best."

== Music videos ==
The original music video for "Hunger Strike" was directed by Paul Rachman who also directed the 2006 punk documentary American Hardcore. A&M decided to reissue the album and promote "Hunger Strike" as a single, with an accompanying music video, which became a buzz bin clip. The video features the band performing the song on a beach and in a forest. The video was filmed at Discovery Park in Seattle, Washington. The West Point Lighthouse is featured in the video. There are two different versions of the video for the track. The music video is playable in the video game Guitar Hero Live.

The music video for the 2016 mix, also directed by Rachman, was filmed at an abandoned elementary school on March 7, 1991. Only Chris Cornell and Eddie Vedder appeared in the video. It premiered on Vevo on September 2, 2016.

== Live performances ==
"Hunger Strike" was first performed live at the band's November 13, 1990 concert in Seattle, Washington at the Off Ramp Café. In the time since the album's release, the band reformed for short live performances on four occasions where both Soundgarden and Pearl Jam were performing. Temple of the Dog performed "Hunger Strike" on October 3, 1991, at the Foundations Forum in Los Angeles, California; October 6, 1991 at the Hollywood Palladium in Hollywood for the RIP Magazine 5th anniversary party; August 14, 1992 at Lake Fairfax Park in Reston, Virginia; and September 13, 1992, at Irvine Meadows Amphitheater in Irvine, California (both shows were part of the Lollapalooza festival series in 1992). Pearl Jam has played the song, without Cornell, on several occasions, most notably during the 1996 tour.

Temple of the Dog reunited to perform the song during a Pearl Jam show at the Santa Barbara Bowl in Santa Barbara, California on October 28, 2003. Vedder and Corin Tucker of Sleater-Kinney performed a rendition of "Hunger Strike" that is viewable as an easter egg on disc 1 of the Pearl Jam Live at the Garden DVD. Chris Cornell performed the song live several times with Audioslave, Brad Wilk singing Vedder's parts. Pearl Jam also performed the song in Antwerp and Barcelona in 2006 with Andrew Stockdale of Wolfmother singing Cornell's parts. Cornell added "Hunger Strike" to his solo live set in 2007. Cornell also performed the song on Linkin Park's Projekt Revolution tour singing Vedder's part with Linkin Park frontman Chester Bennington joining in to sing Cornell's part.

On October 6, 2009, Pearl Jam played in Los Angeles at the Gibson Amphitheatre. They were joined onstage by Cornell to perform the song.

On September 3 and 4, 2011 Pearl Jam played at the Alpine Valley Music Theatre as part of the PJ20 destination weekend in celebration of the band's 20 years together, Cornell joined onstage to perform the song as well as several other lengthy Temple of the Dog and Mother Love Bone tracks.

At the Bridge School Benefit on October 25 and 26, 2014 Pearl Jam were once again joined onstage with Cornell to play the song. The October 26 concert marked the last time that Vedder and Cornell performed the song together.

On July 22, 2015 Halestorm and Corey Taylor performed this song during the 2015 Alternative Press Music Awards.

On August 9, 2015 Zac Brown Band performed this song during the final show of their three night stand at Boston's Fenway Park.

The original members of Temple of the Dog (minus Vedder), performed the song during the band's first tour in the fall of 2016 in celebration of the 25th anniversary of their self-titled album, with the crowd singing Vedder's parts. "It was one of the most emotional moments in the show", Cornell said. During the concert at the Paramount Theatre in Seattle on November 21, 2016, Chris Cornell dedicated the song to Eddie Vedder and asked for the crowd to sing Vedder's part.

== Track listing ==
All songs written by Chris Cornell, except where noted:

7" vinyl (Germany and UK), 7" promotional vinyl (UK), CD (Australia), and Cassette (UK)

1. "Hunger Strike" – 4:03
2. "All Night Thing" – 3:52

12" vinyl (UK), 12" promotional vinyl (UK), CD (Germany and UK), and Promotional CD (UK)

1. "Hunger Strike" – 4:03
2. "Your Saviour" – 4:02
3. "All Night Thing" – 3:52

Promotional CD (Canada) and Promotional CD (US)

1. "Hunger Strike" – 4:03

Promotional Cassette (US)

1. "Hunger Strike" – 4:03
2. "Say Hello 2 Heaven" (excerpt)
3. "Pushin Forward Back" (excerpt) (Jeff Ament, Stone Gossard, Cornell)
4. "Reach Down" (excerpt)

== Personnel ==
- Chris Cornell – vocals
- Eddie Vedder – vocals
- Mike McCready – lead guitar
- Stone Gossard – rhythm guitar
- Jeff Ament – bass guitar
- Matt Cameron – drums

== Covers ==
In May 2021, American rock band Daughtry released a cover of the song as a digital single, featuring guest vocals from Sevendust frontman Lajon Witherspoon. The cover later appeared on Walmart-exclusive CD pressings of Daughtry's sixth studio album Dearly Beloved (2021). In August 2025, Stephen Wilson Jr. Released a cover of the track on his EP Blankets.

== Chart positions ==
| Chart (1992) | Peak position |
|---|---|
| Canada Top Singles (RPM) | 50 |
| New Zealand (Recorded Music NZ) | 47 |
| UK Singles (Official Charts) | 51 |
| US Mainstream Rock (Billboard) | 4 |
| US Alternative Airplay (Billboard) | 7 |

| Chart (2017) | Peak position |
|---|---|
| US Hot Rock & Alternative Songs (Billboard) | 16 |
| US Rock Digital Song Sales (Billboard) | 8 |

== Certifications ==
| Region | Certification | Certified units/sales |
|---|---|---|
| New Zealand (RMNZ) | 2× Platinum | 60,000^{‡} |
^{‡} Sales+streaming figures based on certification alone.
