= Mike Shinoda discography =

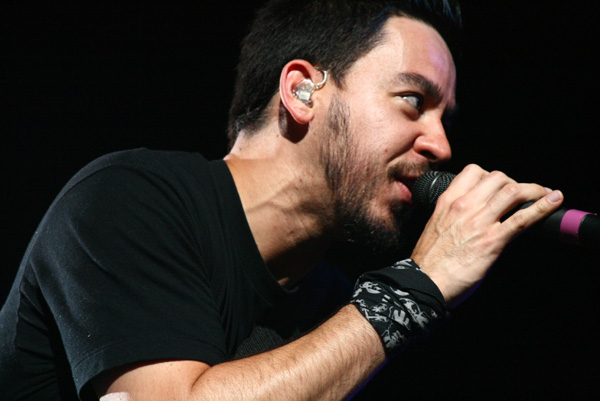
- Shinoda performing
- Studio albums: 4
- EPs: 3
- Singles: 11
- Video albums: 1
- Music videos: 22

The discography of American rapper and Linkin Park vocalist Mike Shinoda consists of four studio albums, two extended plays (EPs), six singles, six promotional singles and one other charted track.

His debut studio album, Post Traumatic, was released on June 15, 2018, via Warner Bros and Machine Shop. It topped the Top Rock Albums and Top Alternative Albums at number one and peaked on the Billboard 200 at sixteenth. The album also placed in the top ten of countries such as Germany, Austria, Switzerland and Czech Republic at number two, four, seven and nine respectively.

His debut EP, also titled Post Traumatic, was released on January 25, 2018 via Warner Bros and Machine Shop. Shinoda's best charting singles include "Crossing a Line", "Make It Up as I Go", "Watching as I Fall" and "Over Again", that have charted on either Rock Songs and/or Alternative Songs on Billboard.

== Studio albums ==
List of studio albums, with selected chart positions
Title	Album details	Peak chart positions									
Title	Album details	US	US Rock	US Alt.	AUS	AUT	CAN	GER	NZ	SWI	UK
Post Traumatic	Release date: June 15, 2018; Label: Warner Bros., Machine Shop; Formats: CD, LP, DL	16	1	1	12	4	18	2	40	7	20
Dropped Frames, Vol. 1	Release date: July 10, 2020; Label: Kenji Kobayashi Productions; Formats: DL	—	—	—	—	—	—	—	—	—	—
Dropped Frames, Vol. 2	Release date: July 31, 2020; Label: Kenji Kobayashi Productions; Formats: DL	—	—	—	—	—	—	—	—	—	—
Dropped Frames, Vol. 3	Release date: September 18, 2020; Label: Kenji Kobayashi Productions; Formats: DL	—	—	—	—	—	—	—	—	—	—

== Extended plays ==
List of extended plays,
Title	Album details
Post Traumatic	Release date: January 25, 2018; Label: Warner Bros., Machine Shop; Formats: CD, LP, DL
Ziggurats	Release date: December 3, 2021; Label: Warner Bros., Machine Shop, Kenji Kobayashi Productions; Formats: DL
The Crimson Chapter	Release date: December 1, 2023; Label: Warner Records; Formats: DL

== Singles ==
=== As lead artist ===
List of singles, with selected chart positions, showing year released and album name
Title	Year	Peak chart positions			Album
Title	Year	US Alt.	US Rock	US Main	Album
"Crossing a Line"^{[A]}	2018	28	27	—	Post Traumatic
"Make It Up as I Go" (featuring K.Flay)	2018	21	45	—	Post Traumatic
"Fine"	2019	—	—	—	Non-album single
"Open Door"	2020	—	—	—	Dropped Frames, Vol. 1
"License to Waltz"	2020	—	—	—	Dropped Frames, Vol. 3
"Happy Endings" (featuring Iann Dior and Upsahl)	2021	9	50	—	Non-album single
"In My Head" (featuring Kailee Morgue)	2023	7	—	—	The Crimson Chapter
"Already Over"	2023	10	—	9	The Crimson Chapter
"—" denotes a recording that did not chart or was not released.

=== As featured artist ===
List of singles as featured artist, with selected chart positions, showing year released and album name
Title	Year	Peak chart positions					Album
Title	Year	US	AUS	GER	SWI	UK	Album
"It's Goin' Down" (The X-Ecutioners featuring Mike Shinoda and Mr. Hahn)	2002	85	28	56	69	7	Built from Scratch
"Second to None" (Styles of Beyond featuring Mike Shinoda)	2007	—	—	—	—	—	Transformers: The Album
"Waiting for Tomorrow" (Martin Garrix and Pierce Fulton featuring Mike Shinoda)	2018	—	—	—	—	—	Bylaw EP
"Last One to Know" (Steve Aoki featuring Mike Shinoda and Lights)	2020	—	—	—	—	—	Neon Future IV
"—" denotes a recording that did not chart or was not released in that territory.

== Promotional singles ==
List of promotional singles, showing year released and album name
Title	Year	Album
"Nothing Makes Sense Anymore"	2018	Post Traumatic
"About You" (featuring Blackbear)	2018	Post Traumatic
"Running from My Shadow" (featuring Grandson)	2018	Post Traumatic
"Ghosts"	2018	Post Traumatic
"Super Galaxtica"	2020	Dropped Frames, Vol. 1
"Osiris"	2020	Dropped Frames, Vol. 1
"Golden Falcon"	2021	Non-album single
"Uproar"	2021	Non-album single
"—" denotes a recording that did not chart or was not released in that territory.

== Other charted songs ==
List of other charted songs, showing year released and album name
Title	Year	Peak chart positions		Album
Title	Year	US Rock	NZ Hot	Album
"Over Again"	2018	36	—	Post Traumatic
"Watching as I Fall"	2018	44	—	Post Traumatic
"Heavy Is the Crown" (with Emily Armstrong)	2024	42	35	Arcane League of Legends: Season 2

== Video albums ==
List of extended plays,
Title	Album details
Mike Shinoda Soundcheck Session: Live in Moscow	Release date: November 15, 2018; Label: Warner Bros.; Formats: DL

== Music videos ==
List of singles, showing year released, directors and album
Title	Year	Director(s)	Album
"Place to Start"	2018	Mike Shinoda	Post Traumatic
"Over Again"	2018	Mike Shinoda	Post Traumatic
"Watching as I Fall"	2018	Mike Shinoda	Post Traumatic
"Crossing a Line"	2018	Aaron Farley	Post Traumatic
"Nothing Makes Sense Anymore"	2018	Mike Shinoda	Post Traumatic
"About You"	2018	Mike Shinoda	Post Traumatic
"Running from My Shadow"	2018	Gus Black	Post Traumatic
"Ghosts"	2018	Mike Shinoda	Post Traumatic
"Promises I Can't Keep"	2018	Mark Fiore	Post Traumatic
"Lift Off"	2018	Mark Fiore	Post Traumatic
"Brooding"	2018	Rob Daly & Mark Fiore	Post Traumatic
"Make It Up as I Go"	2018	Antoni Sendra	Post Traumatic
"Can't Hear You Now"	2018	Tim Mattia	Post Traumatic
"I.O.U."	2019	Chady Awad	Post Traumatic
"Crossing a Line" (Rough Sketch version)	2019	Mike Shinoda	Post Traumatic
"World's on Fire"	2019	Mike Shinoda & Juan M. Urbina	Post Traumatic
"Fine"	2019	Dmitri Komm & Egor Baranov	Non-album single
"Open Door"	2020	Mike Shinoda & Ana Ginter	Dropped Frames, Vol. 1
"Happy Endings"	2021	PIX3LFACE	Non-album single
"In My Head"	2023	Jacky Lu	Scream VI
"Hold it Together"	2023	Mark Fiore	Post Traumatic
"Already Over"	2023	Dusty Green	Evolution of Mike Shinoda

== As Fort Minor ==
=== Studio album ===
Year	Title	Peak chart Positions								Certifications
Year	Title	US	AUT	FRA	GER	NLD	NZ	SWI	UK	Certifications
2005	The Rising Tied: Released: November 22, 2005; Label: Machine Shop / Warner Bros.	51	37	151	25	79	22	42	142	RIAA: Platinum

=== Mixtapes ===
- 2005: Fort Minor Sampler Mixtape
- 2005: Fort Minor: We Major

=== EPs ===
- 2006: Sessions@AOL
- 2006: Fort Minor Militia EP

=== Instrumental albums ===
- 2005: Instrumental Album: The Rising Tied

=== Singles ===
List of singles, with selected chart positions and certifications, showing year released and album name
Title	Year	Peak chart positions										Certifications	Album
Title	Year	US	AUS	AUT	FIN	FRA	GER	NLD	NZ	SWI	UK	Certifications	Album
"Petrified"	2005	—	—	—	—	—	—	—	—	—	—		The Rising Tied
"Remember the Name" (featuring Styles of Beyond)	2005	66	—	—	—	—	—	—	—	—	—	RIAA: 4× Platinum; BPI: Platinum	The Rising Tied
"Believe Me" (featuring Eric Bobo & Styles of Beyond)	2005	—	43	47	5	—	29	58	—	—	92		The Rising Tied
"Where'd You Go" (featuring Holly Brook & Jonah Matranga)	2006	4	41	29	8	24	18	15	14	62	—	RIAA: Platinum	The Rising Tied
"S.C.O.M. / Dolla / Get It / Spraypaint & Ink Pens" (Promo CD) ("S.C.O.M." performed by Ryu featuring Juelz Santana & Celph Titled / "Dolla" performed by Fort Minor featuring Styles of Beyond / "Get It" performed by Styles of Beyond / "Spraypaint & Inkpens" performed by Ghostface Killah featuring Mike Shinoda and Lupe Fiasco)	2006	—	—	—	—	—	—	—	—	—	—		Fort Minor: We Major
"Welcome"	2015	—	—	—	—	—	—	—	—	—	—		Non-album single
"—" denotes a recording that did not chart or was not released in that territory.

=== Fort Minor Militia exclusive tracks ===
Militia is the debut studio EP for the Fort Minor's official fan club, known as the "Fort Minor Militia". Subscribers were given exclusive tracks for digital download that were never officially released with the exception of "Kenji (Interview Version)" and "Believe Me (Club Remix)", which were later released to Linkin Park and Styles of Beyond's official websites respectively. These tracks are sometimes referred to as the Fort Minor Militia EP.

Date	Title
November 2005	"Do What We Did" (Demo) (featuring Styles of Beyond)
December 2005	"Kenji" (Interview Version)
January 2006	"Tools of the Trade" (Demo) (featuring Styles of Beyond & Celph Titled)
February 2006	"Where'd You Joe?" ("Where'd You Go" Remix by Mr. Hahn) (featuring Holly Brook)
April 2006	"Believe Me" (Club Remix) (featuring Eric Bobo & Styles of Beyond)
May 2006	"Start It All Up" (Demo)
June 2006	"Move On" (Demo) (featuring Mr. Hahn)

=== Music videos ===
Date	Title	Director
January 12, 2005	"Petrified"	Robert Hales
February 26, 2005	"Remember the Name"	Kimo Proudfoot
December 12, 2005	"Believe Me"	Laurent Briet
May 29, 2006	"Where'd You Go"	Philip Andelman
June 22, 2015	"Welcome"	Jeff Nicholas

== With Linkin Park ==
Main articles: Linkin Park discography and songs

== Notes ==
- A "Crossing a Line" and "Nothing Makes Sense Anymore" were released together as a double A-side single on iTunes and Spotify.
