= Petrifaction (disambiguation) =

Petrifaction is the replacement of organic matter by minerals in fossilization.

Petrifaction may also refer to:

- An architectural term – see Classical architecture#Petrification
- Petrifaction in mythology and fiction
- "Petrified", a song by Fort Minor from The Rising Tied

== See also ==
- Putrefaction
