= Remember the Name =

Single by Fort Minor featuring Styles of Beyond

from the album The Rising Tied
- Released: September 20, 2005
- Studio: NRG Studios
- Genre: Alternative hip-hop
- Length: 3:47
- Label: Warner Bros.; Machine Shop
- Songwriters: Takbir Bashir; Ryan Maginn; Mike Shinoda
- Producer: Mike Shinoda

Fort Minor singles chronology
"Remember the Name" (2005)	"Believe Me" (2005)

Mike Shinoda solo singles chronology
"Enjoy the Silence 04" (2004)	"Petrified/Remember the Name" (2005)	"Believe Me" (2005)

Music video
- "Remember the Name" on YouTube

"Remember the Name" is a song by Fort Minor, the hip-hop side project of rock band Linkin Park's co-lead vocalist Mike Shinoda. It is the second single from his 2005 album The Rising Tied and features underground hip-hop band Styles of Beyond. It was released alongside the album's first single, "Petrified". A music video for the song was directed by Kimo Proudfoot.

The single initially failed to chart in 2005. However, in 2006, the single received moderate success due to its use in the media and possibly the success of "Where'd You Go", another Fort Minor single. Despite numerous low peaks in different charts, the song was used extensively in the media, particularly at sports events, and eventually received a Platinum certification by the Recording Industry Association of America in 2009 and by the British Phonographic Industry in 2024. In 2018, the RIAA certified the song 4× Platinum.

== Background ==
David Campbell conducted the strings for the song. Since Shinoda performed the main loop on the keyboards, the cellists had a difficult time performing the loop. Eventually, they resorted to breaking up the phrase, such that each cellist plays one or two notes.

== Music video ==
The music video, directed by Kimo Proudfoot, shows the song's three vocalists, Mike Shinoda and hip-hop group Styles of Beyond members Takbir Bashir and Ryan Maginn, walking around a bar. The video has cameo appearances from Chester Bennington, Brad Delson, and Rob Bourdon of Linkin Park, singer Holly Brook, Rob Dyrdek and Christopher "Big Black" Boykin of MTV's Rob & Big, DJ Cheapshot and Vin Skully of Styles of Beyond, and rapper Sixx John.

== Track listing ==
Vinyl single – iTunes EP
No.	Title	Length
1.	"Petrified" (radio edit)	3:43
2.	"Petrified" (album version)	3:41
3.	"Petrified" (instrumental)	3:42
4.	"Remember the Name" (radio edit)	3:47
5.	"Remember the Name" (album version)	3:47
6.	"Remember the Name" (instrumental)	3:48

== Appearance in media ==
The song has been used extensively in the media, and played at many stadiums and arenas throughout the United States, including several colleges. The National Basketball Association used "Remember the Name" as the theme song for the 2006 and 2007 NBA Playoffs as well as the 2008 NBA draft. The song is also featured on the soundtrack of the EA Sports video game NBA Live 06.

The song was used in "The OG", the twelfth episode in the second season of the CBS TV series Numb3rs.

An instrumental of the song was used for the opening intro of the 2006 year-end American Top 40 chart, despite the song itself never charting on American Top 40.

The song is featured in promotional TV trailers for the 2006 movie, Gridiron Gang, NBC's 2006 series, Friday Night Lights, and Pride, directed by Sunu Gonera, as well as the trailer for Fighting, and the trailer for the 2010 remake of The Karate Kid. The song was also featured in the 2018 movie Peter Rabbit, with some lyrics changed to fit the context of the movie.

The song has been featured in the TV commercial for the 50th Grammy Awards in 2008.

On March 19, 2011, UFC premiered the trailer for UFC 129, which featured the song.

The song was also featured in the 2013 film The Smurfs 2.

On April 3, 2016, WWE used the song in the opening video package for WrestleMania 32.

In 2019 the BBC used a cover of the song by Ms Banks to promote its coverage of the FIFA Women's World Cup.

In 2022, WWE again used the song for retrospective packages to promote the 20th anniversary of the debut of John Cena, as well as Cena's match on the December 30, 2022 episode of Smackdown.

This song was featured in Beat Saber music pack titled Linkin Park x Mike Shinoda, released October 5, 2023.

This song is featured in the EA Sports UFC 6 video game, released June 2026.

== Charts ==
Chart (2006)	Peak position
US Billboard Hot 100	66
US Pop Airplay (Billboard)	38

== Certifications ==
Region	Certification	Certified units/sales
Denmark (IFPI Danmark)	Platinum	90,000^{‡}
Italy (FIMI)	Gold	35,000^{‡}
New Zealand (RMNZ)	2× Platinum	60,000^{‡}
United Kingdom (BPI)	Platinum	600,000^{‡}
United States (RIAA)	4× Platinum	4,000,000^{‡}
Streaming
Denmark (IFPI Danmark)	Gold	900,000^{†}
^{‡} Sales+streaming figures based on certification alone.^{†} Streaming-only figures based on certification alone.

== Release history ==
Release dates and formats for "Remember the Name"
Region	Date	Format	Label(s)	Ref.
United States	August 14, 2006	Mainstream airplay	Machine Shop; Warner Bros.	
