= Post Traumatic =

Studio album by Mike Shinoda
- Released: June 15, 2018
- Recorded: August 2017–January 2018
- Studios: The Stockroom; The Village Studios
- Genres: Hip hop; rock
- Length: 53:04
- Labels: Machine Shop; Warner Bros.
- Producer: Mike Shinoda

Mike Shinoda chronology
Post Traumatic EP (2018)	Post Traumatic (2018)	Dropped Frames (2020)

Singles from Post Traumatic
- 1. "Crossing a Line" / "Nothing Makes Sense Anymore" Released: April 3, 2018; 2. "Make It Up as I Go" Released: August 28, 2018

Post Traumatic is the debut solo studio album by American musician Mike Shinoda. It was released on June 15, 2018, through Warner Bros. Records and Shinoda's label Machine Shop Records. Issued under Shinoda's own name instead of the Fort Minor moniker, it is his second studio album outside of his band Linkin Park after Fort Minor's The Rising Tied (2005).

The album was announced on March 29, 2018, along with the release of two songs to promote the album, "Crossing a Line" and "Nothing Makes Sense Anymore". "Crossing a Line" and "Make It Up as I Go" were issued to radio stations as the album's two official singles.

Shinoda himself served as the primary producer of the album but with additional production on a few tracks by BASECAMP, Andrew Dawson, and Boonn. Linkin Park guitarist Brad Delson, Blackbear, K.Flay, Deftones lead vocalist Chino Moreno, Machine Gun Kelly, Ross Golan, Kevin Hissink (Boonn), and Grandson helped write some songs, though most were written by Shinoda.

The album contains content Shinoda recorded mostly by himself but additional instruments were played by Linkin Park drummer Rob Bourdon, Darren King, and Boonn with the content having been written by Shinoda after the death of his Linkin Park bandmate Chester Bennington on July 20, 2017. The three songs from the Post Traumatic EP are included as the first three songs of this album. The album received mostly positive reviews from critics.

== Background ==
On January 25, 2018, Shinoda revealed his second project as a solo artist with the release of the Post Traumatic EP, consisting of three tracks focusing on his feelings after the death of his Linkin Park bandmate and longtime friend Chester Bennington, who died by suicide on July 20, 2017. Precisely because of the issues addressed in the songs, Shinoda decided to publish the album in his name, without using his previous pseudonym, Fort Minor.

In early March, he unexpectedly announced that he was working on a solo album, inviting fans to meet him that day in Los Angeles to hear a new song and to join a music video. The inviting fans' event was documented and featured on the music video of "Crossing a Line". The album was finally announced on March 29, which includes the three tracks on the EP, and according to a statement by Shinoda, "It's a journey out of grief and darkness, not into grief and darkness. If someone went through something like that, I hope you feel less alone. If it has not happened, I hope you feel grateful."

In May 2018, Shinoda unveiled the tracklist, which included collaborations with Blackbear, Grandson, K.Flay, Machine Gun Kelly, and Deftones frontman Chino Moreno.

Every song in the album has its own music video, making it a visual album. All of the album's tracks were solely produced by Shinoda.

== Composition ==
The album begins with the three songs released on the Post Traumatic EP as the "grieving or lamenting" segment of the album. As described by Shinoda in an interview with KROQ, the album "goes from Nine Inch Nails vibes to N.W.A vibes." Some of the music is dark and grieving music while other music is upbeat and about different subjects. In an interview with Vulture, Shinoda describes,

In the beginning, I didn't care what I made as long as I was doing something. Sometimes it would just be for fun, and then eventually I was making some serious stuff about what was going on with me, and those became the first three songs I put out. Since then, I've kept going and realized that, since grief is such a personal thing, this had to be a solo album. I'm basically trying to sum up in the most truthful way the things that are happening in my head as I go. Some days that's really dark, and some days it's totally not. Hopefully as I go, the lighter days become more frequent.

— Mike Shinoda

== Writing and recording ==
Shinoda wrote most of the music on the album himself, but songs like "About You", "Make It Up as I Go", "Lift Off" and "Running from My Shadow" were written with co-writers including: Brad Delson, Blackbear, K.Flay, Chino Moreno, Machine Gun Kelly, Ross Golan, Kevin Hissink and grandson. A leftover song from Linkin Park's last album One More Light, "Place to Start", features percussion from band member Rob Bourdon. Darren King also provided percussion for "Hold It Together". Boonn produced and provided additional guitars for "Running from My Shadow". The album, primarily being produced by Shinoda, was also provided with additional production on few tracks by BASECAMP, Andrew Dawson and Boonn.

Shinoda also stated recording this album helped him in many ways but was a difficult thing to do. As he explained to Kerrang!,

A week after Chester passed, the idea of the studio was scary. And it wasn't just the idea of attempting to make a song and being overwhelmed by those memories. There's another layer of fear for artists in this situation that is, 'What if I can't make anything good [without that person]?' Those hurdles start to accumulate, whether that's fear or depression or the chaos of the outside world, it creates an echo chamber of anxiety. That was one of the things for me, I needed to make some stuff - whether it was usable or not didn't matter. I was making bad '90s grunge songs, making bad rap songs... and then I made something good. I'd make all these things with no intention of putting them out, but just diving into some of the ideas that were already in my head.

— Mike Shinoda

The music was recorded at Shinoda's home studio The Stockroom in Los Angeles.

== Artwork and packaging ==
The album artwork features a signature of Shinoda over a painting of his. Shinoda was helped by Frank Maddocks, who has previously contributed to artworks for Deftones, Green Day's Revolution Radio and Linkin Park's One More Light.

The album was made available with an art book by Shinoda and Maddocks which is a double-sided 9" x 12" book includes expanded and exclusive full-color album art and images of Shinoda's painting series for "Post Traumatic" on one side, and coloring pages of original art when flipped over. The soft-cover art book was available bound with a clear O-card slipcase and includes the CD tucked inside a baby jacket.

On December 7, 2018, the vinyl edition was re-released with a bonus 10", featuring previously unreleased songs. This edition is notable with its slightly altered album artwork.

== Critical reception ==
Professional ratings
Aggregate scores
Source	Rating
Metacritic	73/100
Review scores
Source	Rating
AllMusic	4/5 stars
Kerrang!	4/5 stars
The Guardian	4/5 stars
The Independent	4/5 stars
Pitchfork	3.8/10
Sputnikmusic	3.5/5

The album received mostly positive reviews from critics. At Metacritic, which assigns a normalized rating out of 100 to reviews from mainstream critics, the album has a positive score of 73 out of 100 based on 5 reviews, indicating "generally favorable reviews". Neil Z. Yeung of AllMusic praised the album, stating that "While Post Traumatic takes an emotional toll, it ultimately instills feelings of hope and the idea that things can get better. For Shinoda, Linkin Park, and their devoted followers, it's an effective group therapy session." In a positive review, Ilana Kaplan from the Independent called the album a "triumphant debut", giving 4 stars out of 5. Dave Simpson from The Guardian, noted that although Post Traumatic contains "flaws", he said that "its raw emotion is unusually touching and many will find it a source of tears, strength and comfort", giving 4 out of 5 stars to the album. Kerrang! praised the album altogether stating "It's an important, thoughtful album that will serve to unite the grief-stricken with a new-found sense of purpose to find some form of healing."

== Track listing ==
All tracks are written by and produced by Mike Shinoda, except where noted.

No.	Title	Writer(s)	Producer(s)	Length
1.	"Place to Start"			2:13
2.	"Over Again"			3:50
3.	"Watching as I Fall"			3:31
4.	"Nothing Makes Sense Anymore"			3:33
5.	"About You" (featuring Blackbear)	Shinoda; Matthew Musto	Shinoda; Jordan Reyes; Aaron Harmon	3:26
6.	"Brooding" (Instrumental)			2:31
7.	"Promises I Can't Keep"			3:22
8.	"Crossing a Line"			4:02
9.	"Hold It Together"			3:25
10.	"Ghosts"			2:54
11.	"Make It Up as I Go" (featuring K.Flay)	Shinoda; Brad Delson; Kristine Flaherty		3:29
12.	"Lift Off" (featuring Chino Moreno and Machine Gun Kelly)	Shinoda; Rory Andrew; Colson Baker; Andrew Dawson; Chino Moreno	Shinoda; Andrew Dawson	4:00
13.	"I.O.U."			2:42
14.	"Running from My Shadow" (featuring Grandson)	Shinoda; Delson; Kevin Hissink; Ross Golan; Jordan Benjamin	Shinoda; Boonn	3:24
15.	"World's on Fire"			3:15
16.	"Can't Hear You Now"			3:27
Total length:				53:04

Colored vinyl bonus 10" and digital deluxe bonus tracks
No.	Title	Length
17.	"Prove You Wrong"	3:35
18.	"What the Words Meant"	3:33
Total length:		60:24

== Personnel ==
Credits adapted from the album's liner notes and AllMusic.

- Mike Shinoda – vocals, piano, guitars, bass, drums, percussion, keyboards, synthesizers, samplers, mixing, composer, art direction, paintings, producer

Additional musicians

- Rob Bourdon – percussion (1)
- Blackbear – vocals (5)
- Darren King – drums (9)
- K.Flay – vocals (11)
- Chino Moreno – vocals (12)
- Machine Gun Kelly – vocals (12)
- Grandson – vocals (14)
- Boonn – additional guitar (14)

Technical

- Andrew Dawson – production
- Şerban Ghenea – mixing
- Aaron Harmon – additional production
- Jaycen Joshua – mixing
- Frank Maddocks – art direction, creative direction, design, photography
- Emerson Mancini – mastering
- Manny Marroquin – mixing
- Ethan Mates – editing
- Josh Newell – editing
- Jordan Reyes – additional production

== Charts ==
Chart (2018)	Peak position
Australian Albums (ARIA)	12
Austrian Albums (Ö3 Austria)	4
Belgian Albums (Ultratop Flanders)	25
Belgian Albums (Ultratop Wallonia)	33
Canadian Albums (Billboard)	18
Czech Albums (ČNS IFPI)	8
Dutch Albums (Album Top 100)	42
French Albums (SNEP)	77
German Albums (Offizielle Top 100)	2
Hungarian Albums (MAHASZ)	20
Irish Albums (IRMA)	82
Italian Albums (FIMI)	15
Japan Hot Albums (Billboard Japan)	29
Japanese Albums (Oricon)	34
New Zealand Albums (RMNZ)	40
Polish Albums (ZPAV)	23
Portuguese Albums (AFP)	11
Scottish Albums (Official Charts)	19
Spanish Albums (Promusicae)	26
Swiss Albums (Schweizer Hitparade)	7
UK Albums (Official Charts)	20
UK R&B Albums (Official Charts)	2
US Billboard 200	16
US Top Alternative Albums (Billboard)	1
US Top Rock Albums (Billboard)	1
