= Believe Me (Fort Minor song) =

2005 single by Fort Minor

Single by Fort Minor featuring Eric Bobo and Styles of Beyond

from the album The Rising Tied
- Released: November 14, 2005
- Studio: NRG (North Hollywood, California)
- Genre: Alternative hip hop; rap rock
- Length: 3:43
- Label: Machine Shop; Warner Bros.
- Songwriters: Takbir Bashir; Ryan Maginn; Mike Shinoda
- Producer: Mike Shinoda

Fort Minor singles chronology
"Petrified/Remember the Name" (2005)	"Believe Me" (2005)	"Where'd You Go" (2006)

Mike Shinoda solo singles chronology
"Petrified/Remember the Name" (2005)	"Believe Me" (2005)	"Where'd You Go" (2006)

Music video
- "Believe Me" on YouTube

"Believe Me" is a song by American hip hop musician Fort Minor, the side project of rock band Linkin Park's lead vocalist Mike Shinoda. It was the third US and first international single from Fort Minor's debut album, The Rising Tied (2005), and was released on November 14, 2005. The track features hip hop group Styles of Beyond and Eric Bobo of Cypress Hill.

== Background ==
"Believe Me" is one of two songs in The Rising Tied (other than "Red to Black") where Mike Shinoda also sings (besides rapping), specifically the chorus. The main melody of the song is from Apple Inc.'s GarageBand loops named "Orchestra Strings 08." In the end of the album version of the song, it is heard that Mike Shinoda says, "Okay, so here's the thing", and segues into "Get Me Gone".

== Music video ==
The official music video was directed by Laurent Briet. The video simply shows Fort Minor in a parking garage, which is illuminated by lights that expand to one side. The chorus is presented with more exchanging lights in the shape of Mike Shinoda's head. Also, in the very last second of the video clip it is possible to see somebody (appears to be Tak) possibly tripping over or dancing just after the colored light passes Ryu. In the start of the video the water drops which fall on the ground synchronize with the beginning piano tune. DJ Cheapshot of Styles of Beyond and Eric Bobo also appear in the video, although none of them play any instruments.

The music video is available on the Fort Minor Militia DVD.

== Track listings ==
CD1
No.	Title	Length
1.	"Believe Me" (featuring Eric Bobo and Styles of Beyond)	3:42
2.	"There They Go" (featuring Sixx John)	3:17

CD2 and European CD single
No.	Title	Length
1.	"Believe Me" (featuring Eric Bobo and Styles of Beyond)	3:42
2.	"There They Go" (featuring Sixx John)	3:17
3.	"Petrified" (Los Angeles remix)	3:32

== Charts ==
=== Weekly charts ===
Chart (2005–2006)	Peak position
Australia (ARIA)	43
Australian Urban (ARIA)	13
Austria (Ö3 Austria Top 40)	47
Belgium (Ultratip Bubbling Under Wallonia)	5
CIS Airplay (TopHit)	10
Czech Republic (Rádio – Top 100)	35
Europe (European Hot 100)	90
Finland (Suomen virallinen lista)	5
Germany (GfK)	29
Netherlands (Single Top 100)	58
Russia Airplay (TopHit)	10
Slovakia (Rádio Top 100)	81
UK Singles (OCC)	92
UK Hip Hop/R&B (OCC)	12
Ukraine Airplay (TopHit)	9

=== Year-end charts ===
Chart (2006)	Position
Brazil (Crowley)	100
CIS Airplay (TopHit)	106
Russia Airplay (TopHit)	112
Ukraine Airplay (TopHit)	32

== Release history ==
Region	Date	Format(s)	Label(s)	Ref.
Australia	November 14, 2005	CD	Warner Music Australia	
United Kingdom	November 14, 2005	CD	Machine Shop; Warner Bros.	
