= Where'd You Go (Fort Minor song) =

2006 single by Fort Minor

Single by Fort Minor featuring Holly Brook and Jonah Matranga

from the album The Rising Tied
- B-side: "Where'd You Go" (S.O.B. remix); "Where'd You Go" (Big Bad remix)
- Released: April 14, 2006
- Genre: Alternative hip hop; conscious hip hop
- Length: 3:51
- Label: Machine Shop; Warner Bros.
- Songwriter: Mike Shinoda
- Producer: Mike Shinoda

Fort Minor singles chronology
"Believe Me" (2005)	"Where'd You Go" (2006)	"S.C.O.M. / Dolla / Get It / Spraypaint & Ink Pens" (2006)

Mike Shinoda solo singles chronology
"Believe Me" (2005)	"Where'd You Go" (2006)	"S.C.O.M. / Dolla / Get It / Spraypaint & Ink Pens" (2006)

Holly Brook singles chronology
"Where'd You Go" (2006)	"Coming Home" (2010)

Audio sample
- file; help

Music video
- "Where'd You Go" (Clean) on YouTube

"Where'd You Go" is a song by American hip hop ensemble Fort Minor, the side project of rock band Linkin Park's co-lead vocalist, Mike Shinoda. It is the fourth and final single from Fort Minor's debut album The Rising Tied, released on April 14, 2006. The song features Skylar Grey (who at the time went by her real name Holly Brook) and Jonah Matranga, lead singer of the rock group Far. "Where'd You Go" was written and produced by Shinoda. The song is about the consequences of putting one's career before one's family with the lyrics emanating from the perspective of the person left behind in long-distance relationships.

"Where'd You Go" received generally positive reviews from music critics, with most reviewers noting the song's simplicity, as well as praising Brook's vocals. "Where'd You Go" was Fort Minor's most commercially successful single, peaking within the top 10 of several international music charts. "Where'd You Go" also peaked at No. 4 on the US Billboard Hot 100 and received a Platinum certification by the Recording Industry Association of America (RIAA) in 2009. A music video for the single was directed by Philip Andelman. The video featured three families, who, according to Shinoda, "share the same sense of loneliness as this song." "Where'd You Go" was included in the set list of numerous Fort Minor concerts.

== Background and composition ==
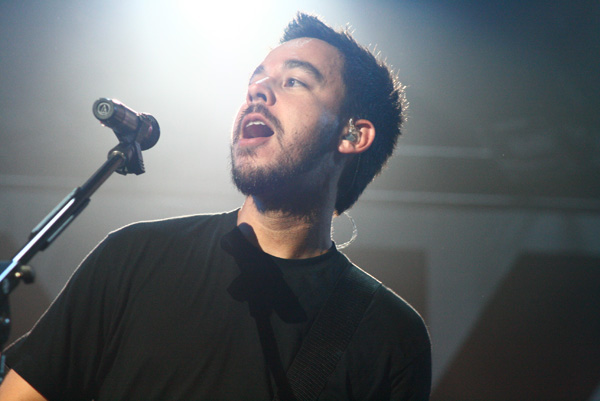
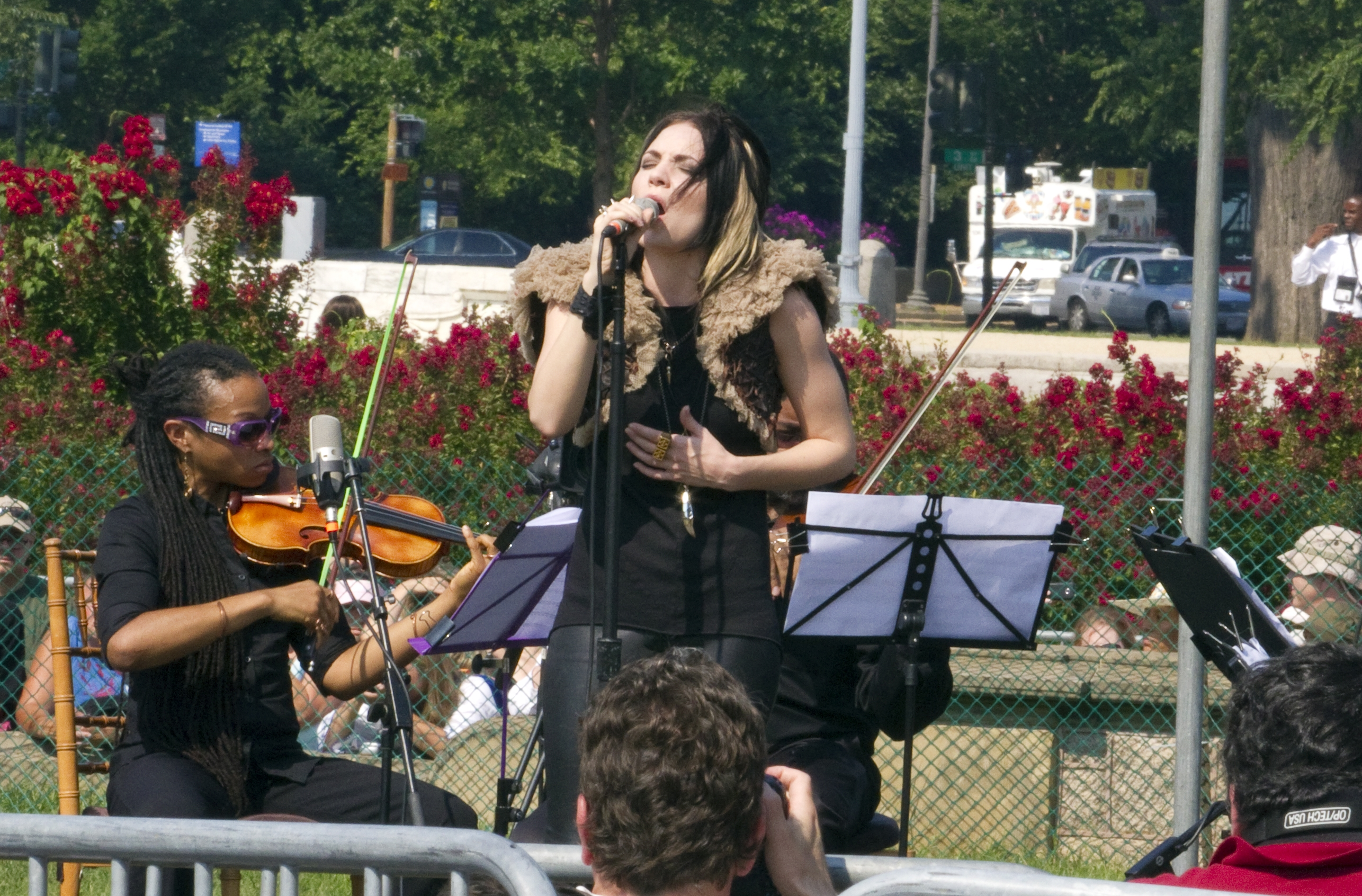
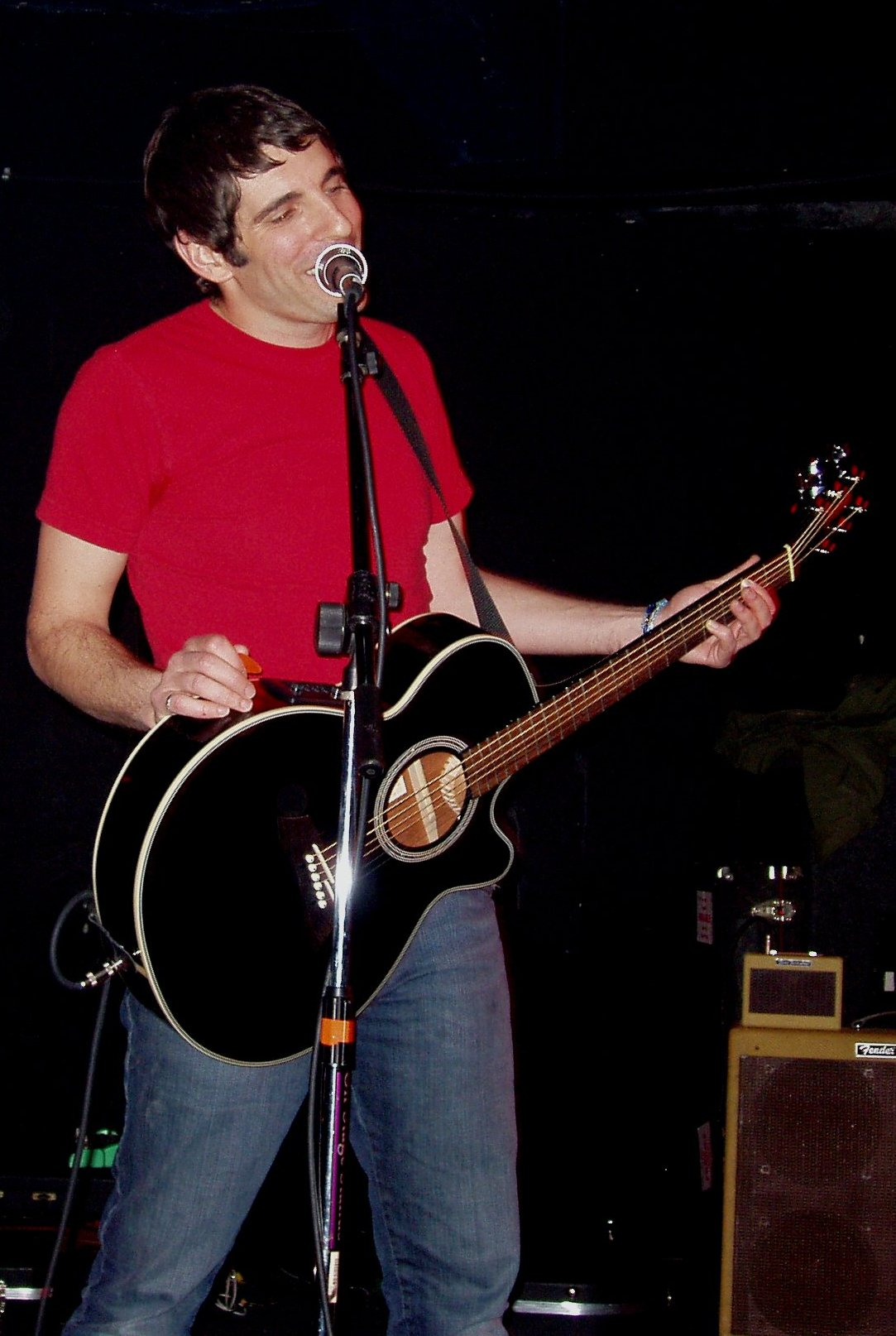
Mike Shinoda (top), Skylar Grey (middle) and Jonah Matranga (bottom) were the vocalists of "Where'd You Go".

"Where'd You Go" was written and produced by Mike Shinoda. "Where'd You Go" is an alternative hip hop song that features a piano-based hook, as well as a choir singing background vocals throughout the song. According to the digital music sheet published at musicnotes.com, the song is written in the key of E major, is it built of the chord progression E- B- C♯m- A, is set in time signature of common time with a tempo of 90 beats per minute and is set in simple time. Brook and Matranga's vocal ranges span from the low note of B_{3} to the high note of B_{4}.

Shinoda wrote the song from the perspective of a person whose lover is always traveling. In an interview with MTV, Shinoda stated why he chose to write from that point of view, saying "A lot of people do songs about being on the road, and I wanted to do this song about the opposite perspective: the people who are at home, your family, your friends, your loved ones who are at home." Shinoda also said that he wrote the song for his wife, Anna. When consulting executive producer and rapper Jay-Z and Linkin Park guitarist and Machine Shop A&R Brad Delson on which songs should be included in The Rising Tied, "Where'd You Go" is one of two songs that he requested not to remove from the album, since the song drives his wife to tears every time she listens to it.

Holly Brook (who was signed to Shinoda's record label Machine Shop Recordings) and Jonah Matranga were featured artists of the song. Shinoda requested Brook to sing the chorus, since Shinoda had already written the entire song. Brook recorded the song for half an hour. Shinoda praised her vocals, calling her voice as "unbelievable." Shinoda affirmed the Brook's musical style "really rooted in the songwriting...You don't need all the frills and the production. You can put her on a $50 mic in a room and she sounds just like the record because the talent is really there. A lot of artists rely on tricks to make their stuff sound a certain way, but we all appreciate the rawness of what she does."

Shinoda stated that "Where'd You Go" was a possible single candidate at the time of the album's release. The song was released as the fourth and final single from The Rising Tied on April 14, 2006, as a digital download.

== Critical reception ==
"Where'd You Go" received generally positive reviews from music critics. Bill Lamb of About.com commended the song's simplicity, saying that it will "draw pop and hip hop fans together with its universal emotional appeal". Spence D. of IGN noted that "Where'd You Go" is "the only genuine lament on [The Rising Tied ]". A reviewer for Mote described the song as having "good production, a good (if a little overused) hook, and a guy with good and strangely familiar flow", buying The Rising Tied after listening to the song. Jo Timbuong of The Star compared "Where'd You Go" with Eminem's "When I'm Gone", except for a "more melancholic feel" through Brook's vocals. Alec Luhn of The Badger Herald compared Brook's vocals to British female singer Dido from the Eminem song "Stan". "Where'd You Go" won the award for Best Ringtone in the 2006 MTV Video Music Awards.

== Chart performance ==
"Where'd You Go" was a commercial success, and reached numerous top 40 peaks in various charts worldwide. It spent twenty weeks on the US Billboard Hot 100 and peaked at number four on June 10, 2006, making Fort Minor's first and only single to peak within the top 40, as well as the first single to reach the top ten on the chart. On June 17, 2006, "Where'd You Go" reached number two on the US Billboard Pop Songs chart. In 2009, "Where'd You Go" was certified platinum by the RIAA, denoting shipments of over a million copies. "Where'd You Go" ranked at number forty-three on Billboard magazine's Hot 100 songs of 2006.

"Where'd You Go" was also successful internationally. In Canada, the single peaked at number seven on the Canadian Digital Songs Chart and number two on Radio & Records' Canada CHR/Pop chart. In the Czech Republic, the song debuted at No. 45 at the International Federation of the Phonographic Industry chart. The single rose to No. 39, entering the top 40 at its second week. At its third week, the single reached the No. 20 spot. It eventually peaked at number two on the chart at its fifteenth week. The single spent forty-six weeks on the chart. In Belgium, the song peaked at number five and charted for six weeks. In Finland, the song debuted at No. 8 on the chart, but dropped to No. 15 at the following week, before falling off the chart. In the Netherlands, the song debuted at Dutch Top 40 chart at number thirty-three. In its second charting week, the song boosted up to number twenty-four, and went to number thirteen at its third week. The song reached its peak at number ten on its fourth week. The song spent fourteen weeks on the chart. In New Zealand, the song debuted on the New Zealand Singles Chart at No. 24 on April 24, 2006, and peaked at No. 14 the following week. The song spent seven weeks before falling off the top 40. In France, the song debuted and peaked at number twenty-four on October 28, 2006. The song spent ten weeks in the chart. In Austria, the song debuted at No. 43 in the week of April 28, 2006, rising to the top 40 in its second week at No. 34. In its fourth week, "Where'd You Go" peaked at No. 29.

== Music video ==
=== Background and synopsis ===
The music video for "Where'd You Go" was directed by Philip Andelman. It features interviews with three different families: a little boy, who has divorced parents and has to undertake numerous chores; the wife of a baseball player Jason Bulger caring for their children; and the parents of a soldier in Iraq. Shinoda is seen rapping in the aforementioned families' homes, Matranga sings the chorus from a car, and Brook sings from a dining room. The scenes where the three vocalists sing also shifts to shots of the families' belongings, homes and neighborhoods. At the end of the video, a brief note by Shinoda states:

"Where'd You Go" was filmed in the homes of three families who share the same sense of loneliness as this song. Thank you for sharing your homes and stories with us.

The video achieved popularity on MTV, and reached No. 1 on Total Request Live.

=== MTV contest ===
In June through July 2006, Shinoda, in association with MTV's Overdrive hosted a contest where US residents of 18 years or older could recreate a new version of the song's music video. The winner of the contest would win a sketch painting by Shinoda that was included in the album's art. On July 31, 2006, the winner was announced. The winning video was directed by David Ly, a graduate film student at Art Center College of Design.

==== Synopsis ====
The remake version of the video is about a person who loses touch with himself. Originally full of life, the protagonist becomes a robot working a monotonous office job. One morning, he wakes up from a dream of a beautiful girl dressed in white on the beach. He leaves for work, and his buried alter egos, dressed in white shirts, black slacks, assorted ties and each holding either red or white roses, emerge mysteriously. At work, his boss gives him a stack of paperwork, which he does mechanically. Meanwhile, at home, the alter egos are in a circle around his coffee table, throw the roses in the center, and leave. Back at work, he prepares to go home, but is then given another stack of documents. His frustrations boil over, and he throws his tie at his boss. He runs home not knowing what he is running for, and at the moment that he walks in the door, the last of the alter egos exits. He finds a white box that replaced his coffee table and is intrigued. He unwraps the red and white ribbons and opens the box to find himself on the beach with the same girl in his dream and the roses on the water.

== Live performances ==
Shinoda and Brook performed "Where'd You Go" at The Tonight Show with Jay Leno on May 24, 2006. The two also performed the song on Total Request Live and Sessions@AOL. "Where'd You Go" was also added in the set list of numerous Fort Minor concerts. Linkin Park lead singer Chester Bennington sang the chorus at two tour dates: one at Dodger Stadium at Los Angeles, California, and the other at the 2006 Summer Sonic Festival at Osaka, Japan.

The song was played solo by Mike Shinoda during the Post Tramatic tour, and, during the From Zero World Tour, the song was regularly covered by Linkin Park (in shortened form)

== Covers ==
In 2006, Brook released an exclusive solo version of "Where'd You Go" to radio stations, written by herself. She also covered the original song that included Shinoda's rap verses in live performances. In 2007, The Deaf Performing Artists Network (D-PAN) created a music video for "Where'd You Go" using all deaf and hard-of-hearing actors. The entire song is performed in American Sign Language with some subtitles. In the video, the profanity is censored in the vocal track but is clearly sung by the actors.

== Formats and track listings ==
All tracks are written by Mike Shinoda.

Europe CD single and iTunes EP (Warner Bros. Records)
No.	Title	Length
1.	"Where'd You Go" (featuring Holly Brook and Jonah Matranga)	3:51
2.	"Where'd You Go" (Big Bad Remix)	4:06
3.	"Where'd You Go" (S.O.B. Remix)	3:17

Cardsleeve single (Warner Bros. Records)
No.	Title	Length
1.	"Where'd You Go" (featuring Holly Brook and Jonah Matranga)	3:51
2.	"Where'd You Go" (Big Bad Remix)	4:06

== Credits and personnel ==
Credits are adapted from the liner notes of The Rising Tied.

- Songwriting, production and mixing – Mike Shinoda
- Mastering – Brian "Big Bass" Gardner
- Choir – Page LA Studio Voices
  - Contractor – Bobbie Page

== Charts ==
=== Weekly charts ===
Chart (2006–2007)	Peak position
Australia (ARIA)	41
Austria (Ö3 Austria Top 40)	29
Belgium (Ultratip Bubbling Under Flanders)	6
Canada Digital Song Sales (Billboard)	7
Canada CHR/Pop Top 40 (Radio & Records)	2
Canada Hot AC (Billboard)	20
CIS Airplay (TopHit)	5
Czech Republic Airplay (ČNS IFPI)	2
Finland (Suomen virallinen lista)	8
France (SNEP)	24
Germany (GfK)	18
Netherlands (Dutch Top 40)	10
Netherlands (Single Top 100)	15
New Zealand (Recorded Music NZ)	14
Russia Airplay (TopHit)	4
Slovakia Airplay (ČNS IFPI)	20
Switzerland (Schweizer Hitparade)	62
Ukraine Airplay (TopHit)	112
US Billboard Hot 100	4
US Adult Pop Airplay (Billboard)	23
US Pop Airplay (Billboard)	2
US Rhythmic Airplay (Billboard)	23

=== Year-end charts ===
Chart (2006)	Position
CIS Airplay (TopHit)	22
Netherlands (Dutch Top 40)	69
Netherlands (Single Top 100)	100
Russia Airplay (TopHit)	19
US Billboard Hot 100	43

== Certifications ==
Region	Certification	Certified units/sales
New Zealand (RMNZ)	Gold	15,000^{‡}
United States (RIAA)	Platinum	1,000,000^{*}
^{*} Sales figures based on certification alone.^{‡} Sales+streaming figures based on certification alone.

== Release history ==
Region	Date	Format	Label(s)	Ref.
United States	April 14, 2006	Digital download	Machine Shop; Warner Bros.	
Australia	April 17, 2006	CD	Machine Shop; Warner Bros.	
