= Post Traumatic (EP) =

EP by Mike Shinoda
- Released: January 25, 2018
- Genre: Alternative rock; alternative hip hop; lo-fi
- Length: 9:35
- Label: Warner Bros.; Machine Shop
- Producer: Mike Shinoda

Mike Shinoda chronology
Medal of Honor: Warfighter (2012)	Post Traumatic (2018)	Post Traumatic (2018)

Professional ratings
Review scores
Source	Rating
AltWire	A+

Post Traumatic is the first EP by Mike Shinoda; vocalist, keyboardist and guitarist of American rock band Linkin Park. The EP, Shinoda's first solo release, was released on January 25, 2018, by Warner Bros. and Machine Shop.

== Background ==
The EP was released about six months following lead singer Chester Bennington's death and contains three songs composed by Mike Shinoda as a way to cope with the loss of his friend and to express everything he'd been going through over this period. In a release note, he wrote:

The past six months have been a rollercoaster. Amidst the chaos, I’ve started to feel an intense gratitude--for your tributes and messages of support, for the career you have allowed me to have, and for the simple opportunity to create.

Today, I'm sharing three songs I wrote and produced, with visuals that I filmed, painted, and edited myself. At its core, grief is a personal, intimate experience. As such, this is not Linkin Park, nor is it Fort Minor--it's just me.

Art has always been the place I go when I need to sort through the complexity and confusion of the road ahead. I don’t know where this path goes, but I’m grateful I get to share it with you.

All three of the songs on the EP received official music videos and were included on the Post Traumatic album.

== Track listing ==
All tracks are written by Mike Shinoda.

Digital download
No.	Title	Length
1.	"Place to Start"	2:13
2.	"Over Again"	3:51
3.	"Watching as I Fall"	3:31
Total length:		9:35

== Personnel ==
- Mike Shinoda – songwriting, performance, artwork, production, mixing on "Place to Start"
- Rob Bourdon – percussion on "Place to Start"
- Manny Marroquin – mixing on tracks "Over Again" and "Watching as I Fall"
- Emerson Mancini – mastering
