= Fort Minor =

Hip-hop side project of Mike Shinoda

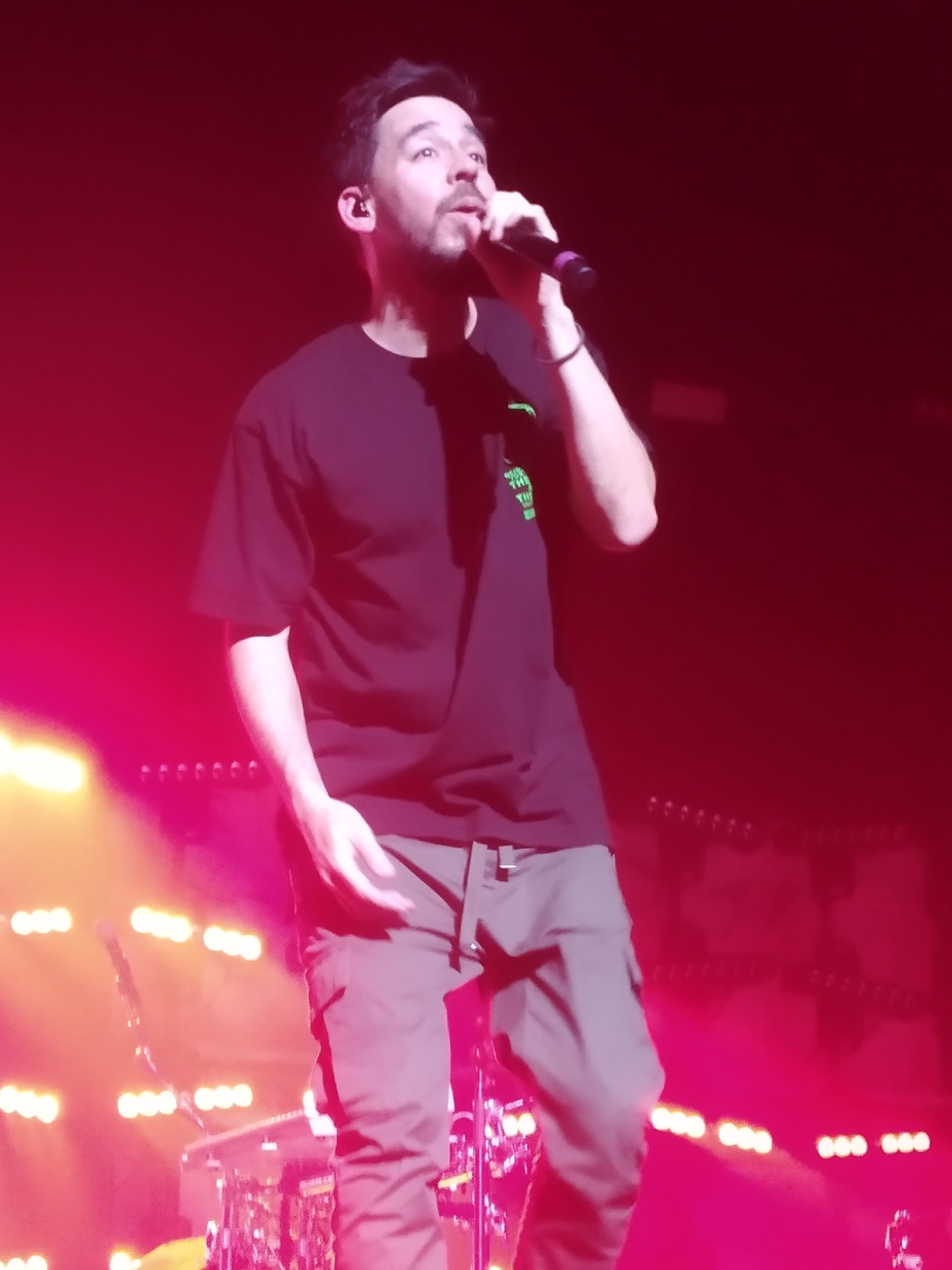
- Mike Shinoda performing in 2019

Background information
- Origin: Los Angeles, California, U.S.
- Genres: Alternative hip hop; rap rock
- Years active: 2004–2006; 2015–2017
- Labels: Machine Shop; Warner Bros.
- Past members: Mike Shinoda
- Website: fortminor.com

Fort Minor was a hip hop side project by American musician Mike Shinoda, who is better known as the rhythm guitarist, keyboardist, producer, and rapper of the rock band Linkin Park. The project's only album, The Rising Tied, was released in 2005. The album's fourth single "Where'd You Go" reached No. 4 on the Billboard Hot 100.

== History ==
=== Formation and The Rising Tied (2004–2006) ===
Mike Shinoda created Fort Minor in 2004. Shinoda uses the name Fort Minor for his collaborations with Ryan Patrick Maginn (Ryu) and Takbir Bashir (Tak), who themselves hail from the underground hip hop group Styles of Beyond.

Shinoda began recording songs for this side project following the release of Collision Course in November 2004. Fort Minor: We Major was a mixtape by Shinoda and DJ Green Lantern to promote his upcoming studio album. The Rising Tied, the debut album of Fort Minor, was released in November 2005. Robert Hales (director) directed its first video "Petrified", which was released the previous month. Jay-Z, who had previously collaborated with Linkin Park on the 2004 album Collision Course, was the executive producer for The Rising Tied. Shinoda told Corey Moss of MTV News that he imposed on himself a requirement to play all the instruments and write all the lyrics to the album except for the strings, percussion, or choir parts. "Where'd You Go", its fourth single, peaked at No. 4 on the Billboard Hot 100 chart, while second single, "Remember the Name", reached No. 66. Another track, "Kenji" describes the experiences of a Japanese-American family during the Japanese American internment of World War II.

Due to the success of "Where'd You Go" during the week of April 26, 2006, sales of The Rising Tied increased by 45 percent, and the album chart position went up 89 positions to No. 104 on the Billboard 200. "Where'd You Go" was awarded Ringtone of the Year at the 2006 MTV Video Music Awards. In mid-August 2006, Fort Minor performed at the Summer Sonic 2006 alongside Linkin Park.

The third track on the album, "Right Now", is featured in the trailer of The Family That Preys by Tyler Perry.

The song "Remember the Name" was used in promotional TV trailers for the 2006 movie Gridiron Gang, as well as the trailer for the remake of the movie The Karate Kid, an episode in the second season of TV show Numb3rs, and the film The Smurfs 2. The song also received attention on HBO's Hard Knocks, where NFL star J. J. Watt was filmed rapping the song during a workout.

=== Indefinite hiatus (2006–2015) ===
In November 2006, Fort Minor released a video for "Where'd You Go". Shinoda has stated he felt the video was a nice wrap-up for Fort Minor. Also in November, Shinoda stated that Fort Minor was currently on hiatus, because of his dedication to Linkin Park.

In 2006, Skylar Grey released an exclusive version of "Where'd You Go" to radio stations, made by herself. Shinoda does not appear on this version.

In the Billboard One-hit Wonders of the 2000s, Fort Minor (along with Holly Brook and Jonah Matranga) were listed at No. 19, due to the success of "Where'd You Go" (since it was Fort Minor's only single that reached the top 25). In an LPU Chat in early 2012, Mike Shinoda said there is a possibility for a new Fort Minor album after Linkin Park's sixth studio album, which was planned for release in 2014. In October 2013, on the Nick Catchdubs remix of Linkin Park's "Skin to Bone", Ryu from Styles of Beyond stated that Fort Minor's mission is not over, hinting at a second studio album.

=== "Welcome" single (2015) and second hiatus ===
On June 21, 2015, Shinoda released a new, non-album single titled "Welcome". Fort Minor also appeared as the musical guest on the TBS late-night talk show Conan on June 22, 2015. No new announcement has been made and the future of Fort Minor is currently unknown. However, ever since Chester Bennington's suicide on July 20, 2017, Shinoda has been performing and releasing songs as a solo act under his real name.

=== Status of Fort Minor (2020) ===
In September 2020, Shinoda addressed the status of Fort Minor on the podcast The Green Room with Neil Griffiths, saying "I'm Fort Minor the way Trent Reznor is Nine Inch Nails. Like, Nine Inch Nails is a group effort, but if Trent doesn't do it, it's not a thing."

He added that there is "no answer" about what's next for Fort Minor. "With Fort Minor I brought different people in to do different things and had some amazing features. I still believe that one of Black Thought's best verses of all time is on Right Now on the Fort Minor record, and it just happens to be on my record. That would have been one of my favourite verses he's ever done, whether or not it was for that record. For me, there's a bit of a high bar. I don't know why."

== Discography ==
=== Studio albums ===
List of studio albums, selected details, chart positions and certifications
Title	Details	Peak chart positions									Certifications
Title	Details	US	AUS	AUT	FRA	GER	NLD	NZ	SWI	UK	Certifications
The Rising Tied	Released: November 22, 2005; Label: Machine Shop, Warner Bros.	51	55	37	151	25	79	22	42	142	RIAA: Platinum; ARIA: Gold

=== Mixtapes ===
- Fort Minor Sampler Mixtape (2005)
- Fort Minor: We Major (2005)

=== EPs ===
- Sessions@AOL (2006)
- Fort Minor Militia EP (2006)
- Evolution of Mike Shinoda (2023)

=== Instrumental albums ===
- Instrumental Album: The Rising Tied (2005)

=== Singles ===
List of singles, with selected chart positions and certifications, showing year released and album name
Title	Year	Peak chart positions										Certifications	Album
Title	Year	US	AUS	AUT	FIN	FRA	GER	NLD	NZ	SWI	UK	Certifications	Album
"Petrified"	2005	—	—	—	—	—	—	—	—	—	—		The Rising Tied
"Remember the Name" (featuring Styles of Beyond)	2005	66	—	—	—	—	—	—	—	—	—	RIAA: 4× Platinum; BPI: Platinum	The Rising Tied
"Believe Me" (featuring Eric Bobo and Styles of Beyond)	2005	—	43	47	5	—	29	58	—	—	92		The Rising Tied
"Where'd You Go" (featuring Holly Brook and Jonah Matranga)	2006	4	41	29	8	24	18	15	14	62	—	RIAA: Platinum	The Rising Tied
"Welcome"	2015	—	—	—	—	—	—	—	—	—	—		The Rising Tied (2023 Vinyl/Digital reissue)
"Already Over (Fort Minor Mix)" (with Mike Shinoda featuring Dom McLennon)	2023	—	—	—	—	—	—	—	—	—	—		The Crimson Chapter
"—" denotes a recording that did not chart or was not released in that territory.

=== Fort Minor Militia exclusive tracks ===
Militia is the debut studio EP for Fort Minor's official fan club, known as the "Fort Minor Militia". Subscribers were given exclusive tracks for digital download that were never officially released, with the exception of "Kenji (Interview Version)" and "Believe Me (Club Remix)", which were later released to Linkin Park and Styles of Beyond's official websites respectively. These tracks are sometimes referred to as the Fort Minor Militia EP.

Date	Title
January 2006	"Do What We Did" (Demo) (featuring Styles of Beyond)
January 2006	"Kenji" (Interview Version)
March 2006	"Tools of the Trade" (Demo) (featuring Styles of Beyond & Celph Titled)
April 2006	"Where'd You Joe?" ("Where'd You Go" Remix by Mr. Hahn) (featuring Holly Brook)
May 2006	"Strange Things" (Demo)
June 2006	"Believe Me" (Club Remix) (featuring Eric Bobo & Styles of Beyond)
July 2006	"Start It All Up" (Demo)
August 2006	"Move On" (Demo) (featuring Mr. Hahn)

=== Music videos ===
Date	Title	Director
January 12, 2005	"Petrified"	Robert Hales
February 26, 2005	"Remember the Name"	Kimo Proudfoot
December 12, 2005	"Believe Me"	Laurent Briet
May 29, 2006	"Where'd You Go"	Philip Andelman
June 22, 2015	"Welcome"	Jeff Nicholas

== Awards and nominations ==
MTV Video Music Awards
Year	Award	Nomination	Result
2006	Ringtone of the Year	"Where'd You Go" (featuring Holly Brook)	Won
