= Welcome (Fort Minor song) =

Single by Fort Minor
- Released: June 21, 2015
- Recorded: 2015
- Studio: The Stockroom
- Genre: Alternative hip hop
- Length: 3:36
- Label: Machine Shop; Warner Bros.
- Songwriter: Mike Shinoda
- Producer: Mike Shinoda

Fort Minor singles chronology
"S.C.O.M. / Dolla / Get It / Spraypaint & Ink Pens" (2006)	"Welcome" (2015)

Mike Shinoda solo singles chronology
"S.C.O.M. / Dolla / Get It / Spraypaint & Ink Pens" (2006)	"Welcome" (2015)	"Crossing a Line / Nothing Makes Sense Anymore" (2018)

Music video
- "Welcome" on YouTube

"Welcome" is a song by American hip hop act Fort Minor, the side project of rock band Linkin Park's vocalist Mike Shinoda. Mike Shinoda released the song via the official Fort Minor site on June 21, 2015. Shinoda has stated the track is not part of a future album and is just meant as a single to be heard "right now". It is also the first release from Fort Minor since going on hiatus back in 2006, and also the last single before another hiatus.

== Background and composition ==
"Welcome" was written and produced by Mike Shinoda. "Welcome" is an alternative hip hop song, that features a church organ-based hook and hip hop based beats. Shinoda made the song available as a free download through Fort Minor's official website, but the song was also made available on iTunes and Google Play as a digital single.

Shinoda described his work on the song, stating:

"Welcome" is an underdog song, an outsider’s song. Fort Minor has always been my outside outlet as a solo musician and painter, and a way for me to build confidence as an individual, though my individual voice. I played every note, wrote and sang every word, produced and mixed the song, and created all the artwork.

— Mike Shinoda

== Promotion ==
In March 2015, Shinoda created a new Twitter page for the group and updated all Fort Minor social networking sites with images of black, hinting at a new upcoming announcement. Many fans have experimented with these images using Photoshop, they have realized by changing the levels of contrast and by trying several different filters that it results in several different interesting images.

In June 2015, Shinoda Posted on the Official Fort Minor Instagram with the word "Hello" on it. He also Tweeted out of the Official Twitter. Fort Minor also appeared as the musical guest on the TBS late-night talk show Conan on Monday, June 22.

On June 21, 2015, Shinoda officially confirmed Fort Minor's return with a status update and the release of a new single, "Welcome". A picture of a handwritten letter states that "Welcome" is a non-album song that is just meant as a single to be heard 'right now'. Soon after, the Fort Minor official website received its first update since 2006, including new merchandise and a free download of the new single. The website also has a new banner reading "Welcome – Coming Soon".

In late-July 2016, WWE announced "Welcome" as the Official Theme Song for the 2016 edition of SummerSlam.

== Music video ==
A 360-experience video was released on 22 June. The video is directed by Jeff Nicholas. If the video is seen using YouTube application on any mobile device, the patron will be able to move around in the space by moving the phone. If it is seen on desktop or laptop computer, the 360-experience will be available by click and drag feature to look around. It is also said that the patron would have a different experience each time on watching the video multiple times.

In the video, Shinoda painted a "Huge" mural made from 1000 "Vinyl Record Jackets". After the video was shot, Shinoda signed and drew on each one, and a vinyl single was placed inside with a print of the entire mural.

Rapper Ryu from Styles of Beyond makes a cameo appearance in this music video.

== Chart performance ==
Despite its status as a hip-hop song, "Welcome" debuted on Hot Rock Songs at 16 with a total of 17,000 sales.

== Formats and track listing ==
All tracks are written by Mike Shinoda.

Digital Download (Machine Shop)
No.	Title	Length
1.	"Welcome"	3:52

Vinyl (Warner Bros.)
No.	Title	Length
1.	"Welcome"	3:52

== Credits and personnel ==
- Songwriting, production and mixing - Mike Shinoda

== Charts ==
Chart (2015)	Peak position
US Billboard Hot Rock Songs	16

== Release history ==
Region	Date	Format	Label
Worldwide	June 21, 2015	Digital download	Machine Shop/Warner Bros.
United States	June 22, 2015	Vinyl record	Warner Bros.
