= The Rising Tied =

Studio album by Fort Minor
- Released: November 22, 2005
- Recorded: 2004–June 2005
- Studios: The Stockroom, NRG (North Hollywood, California)
- Genres: Alternative hip hop; rap rock
- Length: 51:28
- Labels: Machine Shop; Warner Bros.
- Producer: Mike Shinoda

Fort Minor chronology
We Major (2005)	The Rising Tied (2005)	Sessions@AOL (2006)

Alternative cover
- Limited edition cover

Singles from The Rising Tied
- 1. "Petrified" / "Remember the Name" Released: September 20, 2005; 2. "Believe Me" Released: November 15, 2005; 3. "Where'd You Go" Released: April 14, 2006

The Rising Tied is the only studio album by Fort Minor, the hip hop side project of American musician Mike Shinoda. It was released on November 22, 2005, through Warner Bros. Records and Shinoda's label Machine Shop Records.

Shinoda handled production for the album. Jay-Z, who worked with Shinoda's band Linkin Park on their collaborative EP Collision Course, served as an executive producer for the album. Shinoda collaborated with many longtime friends (such as hip hop group Styles of Beyond, Jonah Matranga, Holly Brook and Linkin Park turntablist Joe Hahn), as well as many notable and underground hip-hop and R&B artists (such as Common, John Legend, Black Thought, Lupe Fiasco, Kenna, Eric Bobo, Sixx John and Celph Titled) for the album.

It spawned four singles: "Petrified", "Remember the Name", "Believe Me" and "Where'd You Go", the latter of which was responsible for propelling Fort Minor to mainstream success.

The Rising Tied was met with positive reviews from music critics, who praised Shinoda for straying from mainstream hip hop stereotypes, as well as acclaim from internet and independent music publications. The Rising Tied was a moderate commercial success, peaking at number fifty-one on the Billboard 200.

== Background ==
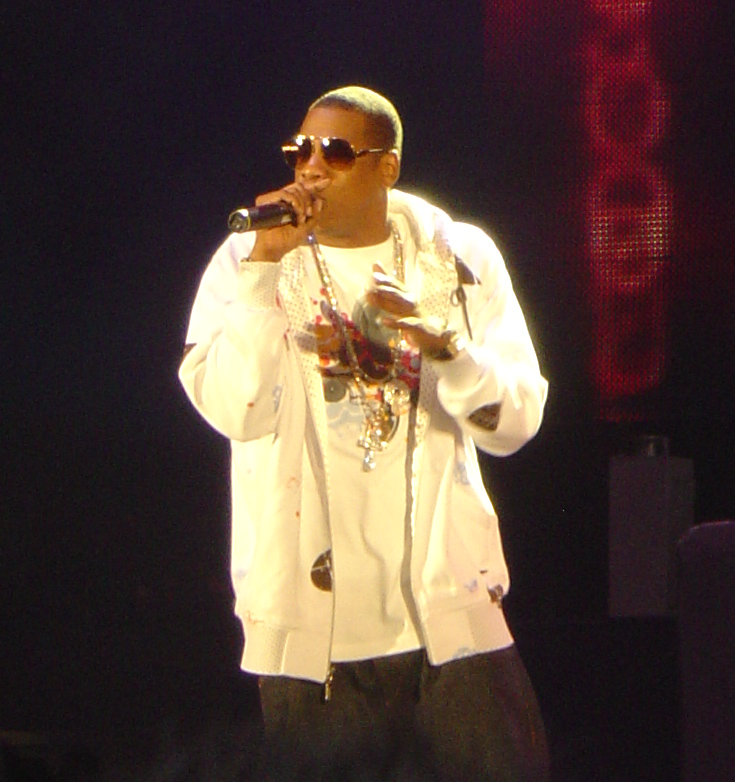
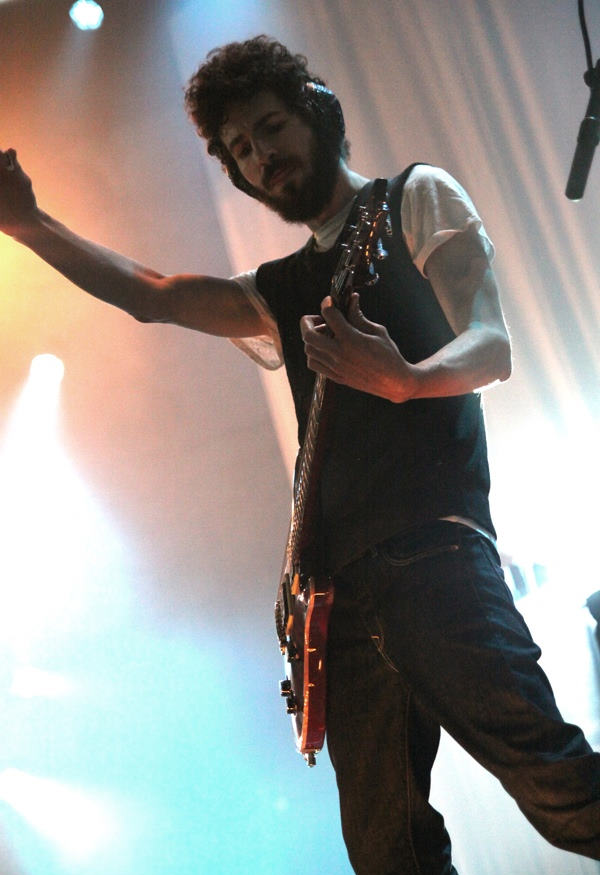
Shinoda consulted advice from rapper Jay-Z (left) and Linkin Park lead guitarist Brad Delson about which songs would make the album's final cut.

On March 4, 2005, Shinoda announced in an interview with MTV that he was working on a solo hip hop album, serving as the album's producer. He described the album in the interview, saying: "It's not straight hip-hop, but it's not rock at all. For our fans who only like the rock side of Linkin Park, I hope you enjoy it, but you never know."

Shinoda also stated that he played every instrument on the album, as well as confirming that Common and Black Thought of the Roots would be featured artists. Common let Shinoda listen to some tracks from his then-unreleased album Be. In another interview, Shinoda then confirmed that he had adopted the Fort Minor name for his hip hop project.

Hip hop icon Jay-Z, who collaborated with Linkin Park in their remix EP Collision Course, was also confirmed to be serving as the album's executive producer. He also announced additional featured artists, including friends such as singers Kenna and Jonah Matranga, Linkin Park turntablist Joe Hahn and Eric Bobo of Cypress Hill; Machine Shop recording artists, such as underground hip hop group and longtime friends Styles of Beyond and Holly Brook; and John Legend, the only artist whom Shinoda did not personally know before the album's production.

Shinoda consulted Jay-Z and Brad Delson, A&R for Machine Shop Recordings and Linkin Park guitarist, to decide which songs to make the final cut of the album. Some parts of the conversation are included in the album. Shinoda felt comfortable working with Delson, saying that: "Since this record is coming out on Machine Shop, our label, I could pick anyone I wanted to work on it, so I chose Brad as our A&R guy, which is hilarious because [...] Brad's not a label guy, he's my friend."

Shinoda's motive for The Rising Tied was to express his hip hop background after his new experiences in the music industry. He stated that he became "antsy...I wanted to make hip-hop again. You know, I always have to mix it with other things, and I didn't want to have to mix it. I just wanted it to be pure hip-hop." He explained the name of his project and the album in an interview with Fixins Music:

I wanted to send out the message that I'm not doing this just to get more attention to myself as a person. It's more about the music than me, and I thought by putting another name on it, it would keep the attention on the music. 'Fort' represents the more aggressive side of the music. 'Minor' can mean a few things: if you're talking about music theory, the minor key is darker. I wanted to name the album rather than having my name on the cover, because I want people to focus on the music, not me. In fact, the reason I named the record 'The Rising Tied' is because it's a play on words. This "tied" group of people are coming up together in the context of this record.

== Style and composition ==
The lyrical content contains many political elements and personal experiences by Shinoda. "Get Me Gone" is about the skepticism and criticism about Shinoda during the early days of Linkin Park.

"Kenji" tells of a Japanese American who, along with his family, is sent to an internment camp in the wake of the attack on Pearl Harbor. Shinoda stated in an interview that his father was born during the Second World War, and was interned alongside his family. He interviewed his father and aunt (in which excerpts were included in the song). About his aunt, he said, "She was there when people were getting pulled out of their houses, and they had absolutely nothing to do with anything [involving the war]. It'd be your average neighbor — or you — getting pulled out of your house because you were racially profiled as somebody dangerous."

The album uses numerous behind-the-scenes conversations. Jay-Z can be heard in the opening track "Introduction"; A conversation between Jay-Z, Shinoda and Brad Delson can be heard at the end of "Where'd You Go" and into "In Stereo"; Shinoda talking about their label's original skepticism about him rapping during the early Linkin Park days can be heard at the end of "Believe Me" and into "Get Me Gone". Some of these can even be heard on the Making of DVD.

== Critical reception ==
Professional ratings
Review scores
Source	Rating
About.com	4/5 stars
AbsolutePunk	81%
AllMusic	3.5/5 stars
Entertainment Weekly	B
The Guardian	3/5 stars
IGN	7.1/10
Rolling Stone	3/5 stars
Spin	B

The album was praised by various music critics. Henry Adaso from About.com praised Shinoda's efforts for straying from familiar themes of hip hop music, stating that he "manages to freeze the genre’s finest moment without yielding to rap album stereotypes". Greg Dona of AbsolutePunk said that Shinoda proved himself as a rapper and as a producer "in convincing fashion" through The Rising Tied. A reviewer of HipHopDX echoed similar sentiments, saying that Shinoda brought "a fresh hip hop sound to a wide audience of listeners, and he did it with an album that is not only better than most LP's from 'real rappers' but with much more passion and dedication". David Jeffries of Allmusic commented that the album was a "surprisingly personal project that sometimes puts the listeners right in Shinoda's shoes". Christian Hoard of Rolling Stone noted that the album has "plenty of humanist appeal" that "translate Linkin Park's stylized angst into sleek boom-bap, complete with agitated pop choruses and deft instrumental ornamentation". A music critic of the Montgomery Advertiser affirmed that The Rising Tied is "a ruminative, sonically fried record as dense and darkly emotional – without pretense – as anything nu metal has thrown up". An editor for The Herald Sun hailed the record as "consistently gripping and surprisingly fun".

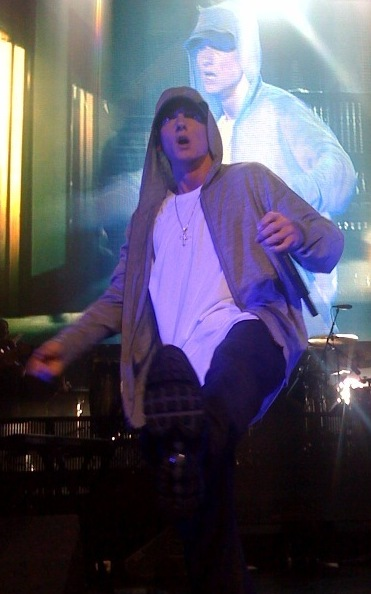
Music critics compared Shinoda's musical style to rapper Eminem (pictured).

Kelefa Sanneh of The New York Times felt that The Rising Tied was "a proper (though not very good) hip hop album", although he defined it as "a tacit reminder that hip-hop isn't merely a musical genre; it's also an identity". IGN music reviewer Spence D. felt mixed with the album's production and arrangement, although he praised Shinoda's vocals and that there are "some genuine moments of surprise and swiftness proving that regardless of his ongoing rock affiliation, Shinoda is a true rap fan and not just some bandwagon buster". Dorian Lynskey of The Guardian felt that Shinoda's "earnest, methodical rapping may be effortlessly outclassed by guest stars [...] but he bolsters it with sulky, darkly metallic beats that sound like Dr. Dre crossed with Depeche Mode". An editor for The Detroit News praised Shinoda's production and the album's featured artists, although he called Shinoda's vocals "lackluster," yet "slightly above K-Fed status". A music critic for The Los Angeles Times said Shinoda "sounds like a suburban b-boy, amiable and sensitive but not charismatic or colorful". A reviewer from Oracle Online thought the album was "important" despite the fact that it "won’t challenge hip-hop heavyweight records such as Kanye West’s Late Registration or 50 Cent’s The Massacre". A music critic of UGO admired Shinoda's production and lyrics, although he thought Shinoda had "limited verbal skills" and is "lacking" compared to the album's featured artists.

Some critics noted compared Shinoda's rapping style to that of fellow rapper Eminem. A reviewer for Entertainment Weekly noted that Shinoda's vocals were "flowing like Eminem on Ambien". An editor for Uncut stated that The Rising Tied was "bound to please fans of Linkin Park and Eminem alike", Jo Timbuong of The Star thought "Where'd You Go" is similar to Eminem's song "When I'm Gone", noting the former as "more melancholic". A reviewer of the Scripps Howard News Service stated that Shinoda's rapping is "a smidge closer to Eminem than he is to Vanilla Ice".

Numerous critics pointed to "Kenji" as a standout from The Rising Tied. A reviewer for The Argonaut felt that the inclusion of audio samples from his relatives "bring the track to life and make the listener truly envision the horrors of these camps". Jo Timboung of The Star called "Kenji" "the most personalized track on the album". A reviewer for Mote stated that the song "blew [her] away," saying: "It's the first hip-hop song in a long time that gave me shivers." An editor of the Philippine Daily Inquirer called "Kenji" "the album's most distinctive song". A reviewer of the Orlando Sentinel called the song the "most impressive testament to Shinoda's scope". Music critics of the San Jose Mercury News and Relish Now recommended readers to download "Kenji" from the album.

The Rising Tied received widespread acclaim from independent and internet publications. A reviewer from IndieLondon complimented Shinoda's direction in the album, summarizing his review: "He could have charted an overly familiar course but has instead sought to stretch himself, and the results are highly impressive." DJ Z of DJ Booth affirmed that Shinoda's musical style "makes his material attractive to consumers who enjoy material for both the attractive sound and absolute breadth". A reviewer of Okayplayer, commending Shinoda's emotional lyrics and "excellent" production, called The Rising Tied "one of the best hip-hop releases of 2005". Steve Juon of RapReviews wrote that for Linkin Park's fans, "the leap to Fort Minor and The Rising Tied won't be a hard one at all". A reviewer for Urban Wire recommended the album to "people who've gone through all sorts of rejection, condescendence [sic] and suffering; The Rising Tied would definitely be an aerial to their emotions".

Not all music critics were satisfied with The Rising Tied. An editor for Stuff deemed Shinoda's rapping style as "rang[ing] from bad to, well, truly awful". M. Taufiqurrahman of The Jakarta Post described the album as "boring".

== Release ==
The Rising Tied charted and peaked at No. 51 on the Billboard Hot 200 chart. Promotional music videos have been filmed for the singles "Remember the Name", "Petrified", "Believe Me", and "Where'd You Go." "Where'd You Go" was Fort Minor's most successful single, peaking at #4 at the Billboard Hot 100. Despite the low peak, the album has exhibited staying power, selling 300,000 copies in the USA and 400,000 copies worldwide. A small club World tour in USA, China, and Australia followed the release of the album. The Recording Industry Association of America (RIAA) certified the album platinum in sales on June 21, 2018.

== In other media ==
- "Remember the Name" was used by Turner Network Television as the theme for the 2007 NBA Playoffs. The song is also in the trailer for 2010 film The Karate Kid. It was also used as the theme for the 2006 Big East Tournament for ESPN and is commonly played at sporting events to this day.

== Track listing ==
All tracks are written by Mike Shinoda, with additional co-writers listed below.

The Rising Tied track listing
No.	Title	Writer(s)	Length
1.	"Introduction"		0:43
2.	"Remember the Name" (featuring Styles of Beyond)	Takbir Bashir; Ryan Maginn	3:50
3.	"Right Now" (featuring Black Thought and Styles of Beyond)	Bashir; Maginn; Tariq Trotter	4:14
4.	"Petrified"		3:40
5.	"Feel Like Home" (featuring Styles of Beyond)	Bashir; Maginn	3:53
6.	"Where'd You Go" (featuring Holly Brook and Jonah Matranga)		3:51
7.	"In Stereo"		3:29
8.	"Back Home" (featuring Common and Styles of Beyond)	Bashir; Lonnie Rashid Lynn; Maginn	3:44
9.	"Cigarettes"		3:39
10.	"Believe Me" (featuring Eric Bobo and Styles of Beyond)	Bashir; Maginn	3:42
11.	"Get Me Gone"		1:56
12.	"High Road" (featuring John Legend)		3:16
13.	"Kenji"		3:51
14.	"Red to Black" (featuring Kenna, Jonah Matranga and Styles of Beyond)	Bashir; Maginn	3:11
15.	"The Battle" (featuring Celph Titled)		0:32
16.	"Slip Out the Back" (featuring Mr. Hahn)	Joe Hahn	3:57
Total length:			51:28

Special edition bonus tracks
No.	Title	Writer(s)	Length
17.	"[Silence]"		0:04
18.	"[Silence]"		0:04
19.	"Be Somebody" (featuring Lupe Fiasco, Holly Brook and Tak of Styles of Beyond)	Wasalu Jaco	3:15
20.	"There They Go" (featuring Sixx John)	Sixx Johnson	3:17
21.	"The Hard Way" (featuring Kenna)		3:54

Special edition bonus DVD
No.	Title	Length
1.	"The Making of The Rising Tied"

Tour edition bonus tracks
No.	Title	Length
17.	"Petrified" (Los Angeles Remix)	3:32

Enhanced CD content

1. The Making of "Petrified" video
2. "Petrified" video
3. Extras - Wallpapers
4. Weblink - bonus online material

2023 vinyl reissue/digital deluxe edition
No.	Title	Writer(s)	Length
17.	"Be Somebody" (featuring Lupe Fiasco, Holly Brook and Tak of Styles of Beyond)	Wasalu Jaco	3:15
18.	"There They Go" (featuring Sixx John)	Sixx Johnson	3:17
19.	"The Hard Way" (featuring Kenna)		3:54
20.	"Welcome"		3:36
21.	"Petrified" (Los Angeles Remix)		3:32
Total length:			1:09:02

== Personnel ==
- Produced and mixed by Mike Shinoda
- Engineered by Mark Kiczula
- Mastered by Brian "Big Bass" Gardner at Bernie Grundman Mastering
- Executive-produced by Shawn "Jay-Z" Carter
- All instrumental parts written and performed by Mike Shinoda, except:
  - Strings on "Remember the Name", "Feel Like Home", "Cigarettes" and "Slip Out the Back" arranged by David Campbell
  - Choir on "Where'd You Go", "Cigarettes", "Kenji" and "Slip Out the Back" contracted by Bobbie Page for Page LA Studio Voices
  - Latin percussion on "Believe Me" by Bobo of Cypress Hill
  - Scratching on "Feel Like Home" by DJ Cheapshot of Styles of Beyond
  - Scratching on "Slip Out the Back" by Mr. Hahn of Linkin Park
- Recorded at the Stockroom and NRG Studios
- Creative direction by Mike Shinoda
- Art direction and design by Frank Maddocks
- Artwork by Mike Shinoda
- Additional artwork and logo design by Frank Maddocks and Jackson Chandler
- Photography by Greg Watermann

== Charts ==
Chart performance for The Rising Tied
Chart (2005–2006)	Peak position
Australian Albums (ARIA)	55
Austrian Albums (Ö3 Austria)	37
Dutch Albums (Album Top 100)	79
French Albums (SNEP)	151
German Albums (Offizielle Top 100)	25
Greek Albums (IFPI Greece)	18
Japanese Albums (Oricon)	14
New Zealand Albums (RMNZ)	22
Swiss Albums (Schweizer Hitparade)	42
UK R&B Albums (Official Charts)	16
US Billboard 200	51
US Top R&B Albums (Billboard)	25

== Certifications ==
Certifications for The Rising Tied
Region	Certification	Certified units/sales
Australia (ARIA)	Gold	35,000^{^}
Japan (RIAJ)	Gold	100,000^{^}
United States (RIAA)	Platinum	1,000,000^{‡}
^{^} Shipments figures based on certification alone.^{‡} Sales+streaming figures based on certification alone.
