= Hybrid Theory EP =

EP by Hybrid Theory (Linkin Park)
- Released: May 1, 1999; November 19, 2001 (reissue)
- Recorded: 1999
- Genres: Nu metal; rap-rock; hip-hop
- Length: 28:18
- Label: Mix Media Entertainment

Linkin Park chronology
Xero (1997)	Hybrid Theory EP (1999)	Hybrid Theory (2000)

Hybrid Theory EP is the first EP released by the American rock band Linkin Park known as Hybrid Theory at the time of release in 1999. The EP was later reissued under Linkin Park in 2001 as the first LP Underground. The EP was later included in the 20th anniversary version of Hybrid Theory as Disc 3.

== History ==
=== Xero and Pre Release (1997- Early 1999) ===
In 1997, LA band Xero released a self titled demo tape, shortly after in 1998, lead vocalist Mark Wakefield left Xero. In 2019, Bassist Dave "Phoenix" Farrel said, "We went through a period where we kinda didn't know what to do with the band, like, the singer we had been playing with was transitioning out and we didn't know if we wanted to continue; if we did, if we wanna continue with just with five guys or how that would even look or work out. And, you know, we tried a bunch of different guys that were LA-based, whatever, and nothing was really working, nothing we're excited about. When we heard Chester stuff he had done, we're just like 'ok, this guy can sing, we need to get him out here quick and see what the deal is.' We got him out and then 'ok, if the band is gonna work then this is gonna work. Otherwise, that's the end of Linkin Park as it is, kind of thing."

When vocalist Chester Bennington joined Xero they changed the band's name in favor of Hybrid Theory in 1999. However the name only lasted for a little over a year when the band rebranded as Linkin Park (A deliberate misspelling of Santa Monica's Lincoln Park) to avoid confusion with the British electronic group Hybrid.

=== Release (1999) ===
Hybrid Theory created their own record label Mix Media Entertainment to produce the EP. About 1500 copies were produced in 1999 of which only a few hundred were sold and the rest where given away. Most of the EP was made available on MP3.com for free, the band would promote these downloads on different forums, chat rooms, and band websites.

=== LPU Reissue (2001) ===
Following the success of Linkin Park's debut studio album Hybrid Theory, the Hybrid Theory EP was reissued in 2001 as the first LP Underground. This reissue had new cover and back art, and new mixing making the overall release louder than in 1999. The first 500 fan club members received a signed copy of the EP.

== Track listing ==
Track	Runtime
Carousel	3:00
Technique (Short)	0:40
Step Up	3:58
And One	4:34
High Voltage	3:29
Part of Me	12:44

"Part of Me" has a hidden track by Mike Shinoda

"High Voltage" was remixed and included in Hybrid Theory (Bonus Edition) with lyrical and arrangement tweaks. "High Voltage" was also on the "One Step Closer" single release.

== Live performances ==
"High Voltage" and "Technique (Short)" was never performed and "Step Up" was never performed standalone it was only performed alongside "Nobody's Listening" and "It's Goin' Down". "Carousel" and "Part of Me" only were played live as Hybrid Theory and "Step Up" and "And One" were played as Linkin Park. "Carousel" was rehearsed by Linkin Park in 2001, but not played.

== Hybrid Theory lineup ==
- Rob Bourdon – drums
- Joseph Hahn – turntables, programming
- Kyle Christner – bass
- Brad Delson – guitar
- Chester Bennington – vocals
- Mike Shinoda – vocals, programming
