= Fighting Myself =

2023 single by Linkin Park

Single by Linkin Park

from the album Meteora20
- Released: March 24, 2023
- Recorded: 2002
- Genre: Nu metal; rap metal; rap rock
- Length: 3:21
- Label: Warner
- Songwriter(s): Brad Delson; Chester Bennington; Mike Shinoda; Rob Bourdon; Dave Farrell; Joe Hahn
- Producer(s): Linkin Park; Don Gilmore

Linkin Park singles chronology
"Lost" (2023)	"Fighting Myself" (2023)	"Friendly Fire" (2024)

Music video
- "Fighting Myself" on YouTube

"Fighting Myself" is a song by American rock band Linkin Park. Originally recorded during sessions for their second studio album, Meteora (2003), it was later officially released on March 24, 2023, as the second single from the album's 20th-anniversary reissue.

== Background ==
Originally written and recorded during the recording cycle for their second studio album Meteora in 2002, the band decided to shelve "Fighting Myself" and later released it as part of the 20th anniversary reissue. Speaking about the song, Mike Shinoda recalled only remembering an instrumental version existing, before discovering the vocals between him and Chester Bennington when looking through old recordings from Meteora for a potential re-release after someone in management sent him an old vocal file for the song. On February 15, "Fighting Myself" was unofficially revealed and played for the first time during a Mike Shinoda interview with Howard Stern on The Howard Stern Show.

== Composition ==
"Fighting Myself" has been described as a nu metal song. It has also been noted to be similar to "Papercut" from the band's debut album Hybrid Theory.

== Personnel ==
Linkin Park

- Chester Bennington – lead vocals
- Mike Shinoda – rapping
- Brad Delson – guitars
- Joe Hahn – turntables, samples
- Rob Bourdon – drums
- Dave Farrell – bass guitar

== Charts ==
=== Weekly charts ===
Weekly chart performance for "Fighting Myself"
Chart (2023)	Peak position
Australia Digital Tracks (ARIA)	23
Austria (Ö3 Austria Top 40)	60
Canada Digital Songs (Billboard)	11
Germany (GfK)	41
Germany Rock Airplay (GfK)	9
Global 200 (Billboard)	168
Hungary (Single Top 40)	31
New Zealand Hot Singles (RMNZ)	7
Switzerland (Schweizer Hitparade)	72
UK Singles (OCC)	81
UK Rock & Metal (OCC)	7
US Bubbling Under Hot 100 (Billboard)	22
US Digital Song Sales (Billboard)	9
US Hot Rock & Alternative Songs (Billboard)	14

=== Year-end charts ===
Year-end chart performance for "Fighting Myself"
Chart (2023)	Position
Germany Rock Airplay (GfK)	86
US Hot Hard Rock Songs (Billboard)	13
