= She Couldn't =

2020 single by Linkin Park

Single by Linkin Park

from the album Hybrid Theory (20th Anniversary Edition)
- Released: August 13, 2020
- Recorded: 1999
- Length: 5:06
- Label: Warner
- Songwriters: Milo Berger; Erik Meltzer; Brad Delson; Chester Bennington; Mike Shinoda; Joe Thomas; Lance Quinn; Brad Baker; Donnie Lewis; Yasiin Bey
- Producer: Mike Shinoda

Linkin Park singles chronology
"One More Light" (2017)	"She Couldn't" (2020)	"Lost" (2023)

Audio video
- "She Couldn't" on YouTube

"She Couldn't" is a ballad by American rock band Linkin Park. Originally leaked in 2009, it was later officially released in 2020 as the first single from the 20th Anniversary Edition re-release of their debut album, Hybrid Theory.

== Background ==
The song was originally recorded in 1999 while Linkin Park was recording material for their debut studio album, Hybrid Theory. The song was one of the first songs recorded by the band after frontman Chester Bennington had joined. An unofficial, bootleg version of the song surfaced in 2009 when a fan purchased a demo CD containing the song from eBay and leaked it. After the band hinted at releasing material earlier in the week, the song was officially released on August 13, 2020, in promotion of the band's 20th anniversary re-release of Hybrid Theory. Its initial release was through a website created by the band to look like a computer desktop from the year 2000. The track is one of twelve unreleased tracks that was featured on the release.

== Themes and composition ==
The song was described as sounding similar to the material that made it on to the original Hybrid Theory album despite its softer sound and longer run-time of over five minutes. The song is more of a ballad and lacks the heavy guitar sound on much of the album, instead focusing on beats, loops, and Bennington's vocals. Rolling Stone described the song's sound as having a "mellow groove with a simple guitar loop twisting around trip hop drums, synths, and record-scratching texture". Late frontman Chester Bennington provides vocals for the verses, while the band's other vocalist, Mike Shinoda, provides the chorus. Additionally, the chorus features a Mos Def vocal sample from the High and Mighty's song "B-Boy Document 99". Shinoda noted the mellower, softer sound of the song foreshadowed the band's change in musical direction found later in the band's career, explaining it was always an approach the band had explored.

== Reception ==
Kerrang! praised the song for sounding like it belonged on Hybrid Theory, stating "Despite its softness and lack of the heavy guitars...despite its length and willingness to run at its own pace...you could slot this anywhere in the album's second half and it wouldn't jar. It may be the one that got away, but it doesn't sound like something that didn't work".

== Personnel ==
Linkin Park

- Chester Bennington – vocals
- Mike Shinoda – vocals, keyboards
- Brad Delson – guitars, bass
- Joe Hahn – turntables, samples
- Rob Bourdon – drums

Other musicians

- Kyle Christner – additional bass

== Charts ==
Chart performance for "She Couldn't"
Chart (2020)	Peak position
US Hot Rock & Alternative Songs (Billboard)	47
