= Across the Line =

Across the Line may refer to:

- Across the Line (radio show), a radio programme on BBC Radio Ulster
- Across the Line (2000 film), a 2000 American drama starring Brad Johnson
- Across the Line (2015 film), a Canadian drama film
- Across the Line: The Exodus of Charlie Wright, a 2010 American action film starring Aidan Quinn
- "Across the Line", a song by Linkin Park
