= Meteora (album) =

2003 studio album by Linkin Park

Studio album by Linkin Park
- Released: March 25, 2003
- Recorded: April–December 2002
- Studio: NRG (Los Angeles)
- Genres: Nu metal; rap metal; rap rock; alternative rock
- Length: 36:41
- Labels: Warner Bros.; Machine Shop
- Producers: Don Gilmore; Linkin Park

Linkin Park chronology
Reanimation (2002)	Meteora (2003)	Live in Texas (2003)

Singles from Meteora
- 1. "Somewhere I Belong" Released: February 24, 2003; 2. "Faint" Released: June 9, 2003; 3. "Numb" Released: September 8, 2003; 4. "From the Inside" Released: January 12, 2004; 5. "Breaking the Habit" Released: June 14, 2004

Meteora is the second studio album by American rock band Linkin Park, released on March 25, 2003, through Warner Bros. Records. It followed Reanimation, a collaboration album which featured remixes of songs included on their 2000 debut studio album Hybrid Theory. The album was produced by the band alongside Don Gilmore. The title Meteora is taken from the Greek Orthodox monasteries originally bearing the name. Meteora has a similar sound to Hybrid Theory, as described by critics, and the album took almost a year to be recorded. It is the first Linkin Park studio album to feature bassist Dave "Phoenix" Farrell after he rejoined the band in 2000 following his temporary touring with other bands.

Meteora debuted at number one on the Billboard 200, selling over 810,000 copies in its first week. Linkin Park released singles from Meteora for over a year, including "Somewhere I Belong", "Faint", "Numb", "From the Inside", and "Breaking the Habit". "Lying from You" was released in March 2004 as a promotional single. Meteora received generally positive reviews, although some critics felt the album's style was too similar to its predecessor.

Meteora has sold around 16 million copies worldwide, making it the 8th best-selling album of the 21st century. It was certified Diamond by the Recording Industry Association of America (RIAA) on October 5, 2026. It was ranked number 36 on the Billboard Top 200 Albums of the 2000s. Some songs from the album were remixed with some of Jay-Z's songs for the EP Collision Course (2004). "Session" was nominated for Best Rock Instrumental Performance at the 46th Grammy Awards.

In February 2023, it was announced that the band would release a 20th anniversary edition of Meteora on April 7, 2023. They released a previously never-before-heard outtake from the album titled "Lost" as the lead single of the reissue. In 2025, Rae Lemeshow-Barooshian of Loudwire included the album in her list of "the top 50 nu-metal albums of all time", ranking it sixth.

== Writing and recording ==
In 2000, Linkin Park worked with music producer Don Gilmore to record and release their debut album, Hybrid Theory. Initial writing for a second album dated back to early 2001, while still touring in support of Hybrid Theory. The band had written around eighty different demos during their Hybrid Theory World Tour and LP Underground Tour, within the span of just eight months. Rough song ideas written then would find its way to the final album; notably the intro for "Somewhere I Belong". Lead singer Chester Bennington recorded guitar notes for it, but found it too folk rock sounding. However, bandmates Mike Shinoda and Joe Hahn reworked it, adding effects to it, and then played it backwards, molding it into something the band was happy with. As explained by Shinoda: "Since I reversed it, it was playing 4-3-2-1. The chord progression was reversed. Then I cut it into four pieces, and I played it 1-2-3-4. And that's why it has that sweeping sound."

We really learned the meaning of pressure. But it wasn't pressure from outside people. It was artistic pressure from ourselves. You can't control the commercial success of a record, so there's no point in investing energy in that. But the quality of your record is entirely up to you, and you can't blame anyone else if you write crappy songs. Before we did Meteora, I listened to Hybrid Theory and Reanimation, and I was like, "Dude, I'm really proud of these records. I don't remember how we did it, and I don't know how we're gonna do it again. We're kind of screwed." Then, fortunately, we were able to invest ourselves fully in the process for 18 months, and that helped us make a really great record.

— Guitarist Brad Delson, speaking about the album's writing background with MTV

Prior to releasing a second album, the band instead chose to release a remix album, Reanimation, in 2002, produced by Shinoda. The experience led the band to want to co-produce their second album, while still working with Gilmore, hoping to expand on the sound of Hybrid Theory with more experimental ideas. In early 2002, after the touring, the writing continued in Mike's home studio, pre-production of the album began there. The band worked in pairs during the writing process, whereas Shinoda was always involved in all the songs. The recording of the songs mainly used Pro Tools, whereas the band used the traditional method of writing, in main studio. In June, pre-production terminated and the band headed for main production. The band finalized Don Gilmore as their producer. When Reanimation was released, the band had started to write the main content. Drummer Rob Bourdon spent eight hours a day in the studio for the recording of the album. By August, the band entered NRG Studios as Bennington also began writing songs with the band.

We knew what we wanted, and we knew how to execute to a certain degree. However, we were also just going for it. We didn't really care about what anybody else was doing. We also didn't care whether or not the songs fit together stylistically as a whole or a collection of songs. It was more like, "This riff is sick!" Then, we'd just scream over it, and the next song would be a mid-tempo ballad and you'd sing the way that song needed to be sang. We were testing. We were students in college. We were in the lab, and we happened to stumble across something everybody liked and it worked. I think Meteora was an extension of that.

— Chester Bennington

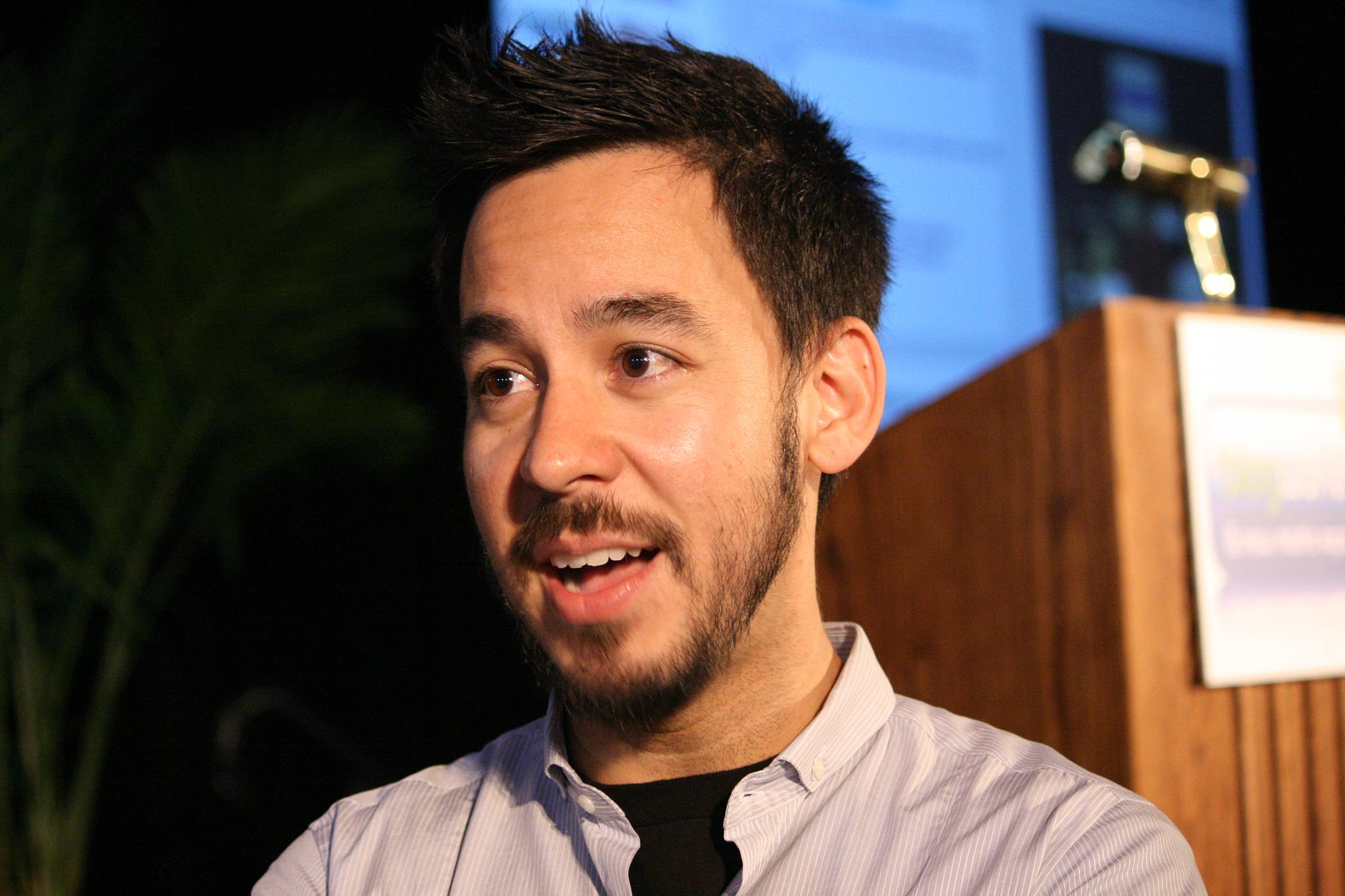
Mike Shinoda (pictured) participated in the writing of all the songs.

Linkin Park had finished rough versions of many songs before entering the studio to begin recording. They spent the time in the studio to create the sound for the album and write the lyrics. By October, the drum recordings were completed and guitar parts were introduced. By the middle of October, the bass parts were introduced. The scratching and sampling parts by Hahn were introduced just a month before the deadline. The song "Breaking the Habit" featured live strings arranged by David Campbell; the song had been worked on by Shinoda for five or six years. The vocal recordings began on a song after all the instruments were finished for it. The band went to New York for mixing with Andy Wallace, where the album was finished in December 2002.

The album's production had unprecedented security in place to prevent leaks and bootlegging, including 24-hour security during mastering. Reviewers were also denied advance copies, and could only listen to the album by visiting the record label's offices.

== Composition and themes ==
Lyrically, the album contains elements including depressing emotions, anger, and recovery. Explaining to MTV, Bennington said: "We don't talk about situations, we talk about the emotions behind the situations. Mike and I are two different people, so we can't sing about the same things, but we both know about frustration and anger and loneliness and love and happiness, and we can relate on that level." In the same interview, Shinoda explained it as: "What we really wanted to do was just push ourselves and push each other to really find new ways to be creative." He continued: "We wanted each sample that was in each song to be something that might perk your ear – something that you might not have ever heard before."

In a promotional interview, Rob Bourdon stated: "We wanted a group of songs that would sit well together because we wanted to make a record that you could pop into your CD player and, from beginning to end, there would never be a spot where you start daydreaming."

In titling the album, Mike said that "Meteora was a word that caught my attention because it sounded huge." Dave, Joe, and Chester elaborated that just like how Meteora, the rock formation in Greece, is very epic, dramatic, and has great energy, the band wanted the album to have that same feeling.

Genre-wise, the album is categorized as nu metal, rap metal, rap rock, and alternative rock. Alternative Press opined that the album represents a release in the scene music style.

== Promotion ==
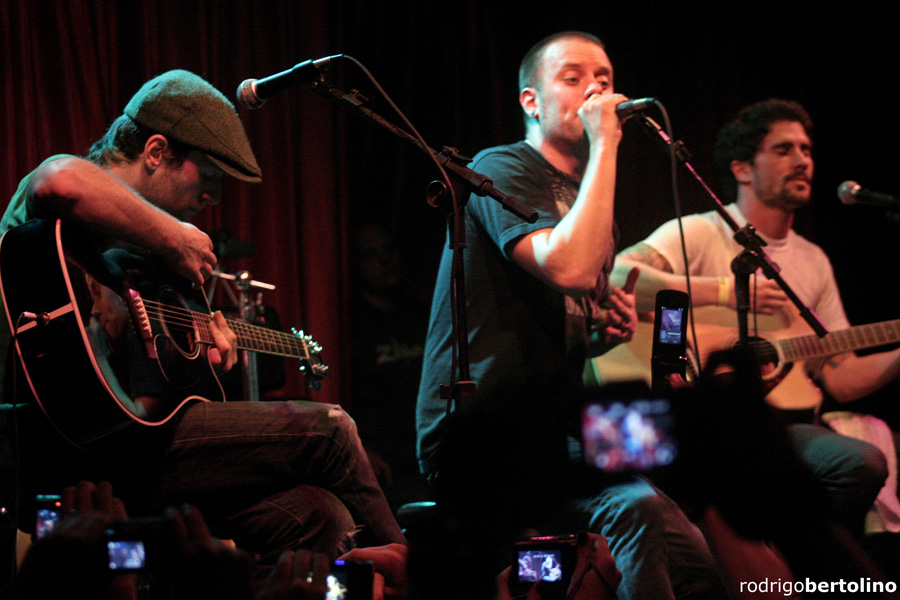
Linkin Park embarked with American rock bands Hoobastank, P.O.D. and Story of the Year (pictured) on the Meteora World Tour.

The promotion for the album began well ahead of its release, as pictures of the band recording were distributed to the media. To support the album, there were many photo shoots of the band on October 29, 2002, at the Ambassador Hotel, where the band took a break from recording the album for two days, for designing the cover art of the album. "The Flem" and "Delta" helped the band for the art works, for the album as well as for the singles spawned by it. A TV commercial for the album was premiered on January 1, 2003.

"Somewhere I Belong" was released as the lead single and premiered on US radio on February 24, 2003. Being released a month before the album release, it influenced the album sales performance worldwide. The second single off the album was "Faint", released before the band started its world tour. The third single "Numb" was released when Linkin Park performed it live in Madrid. "From the Inside" was released as the fourth single off the album before the North American leg of the world tour. "Breaking the Habit" was released while the band was in Indonesia. The album was released with various limited edition content for promotional purposes.

There is a special edition of Meteora, which includes the "Making of Meteora" DVD documentary. The special-edition package was packaged in a blue tinted case with the blue Meteora cover that can be found in some parts of Asia, United States, and more commonly in India. An alternate Indian version contains an alternate DVD and alternative cover that is packaged in a slimline case with the disc in original packaging. The "Tour Edition" of Meteora is packaged in a two disc set. The second disc, which is a Video CD, has the music videos for "Somewhere I Belong", "Faint", "Numb", and "Breaking the Habit". The tour edition is packaged in a standard Compact Disc case, rather than their trademark digipak case. The album was also released on a very limited quantity of vinyl records (spread across two LPs) under Warner Brothers. These are coveted by collectors and fetch high prices at auction. In 2014, Linkin Park released a demo version of Shinoda singing the song, on their 14th annual fan club CD, LPU XIV.

The band promoted the album with their Meteora World Tour and various other supporting tours. The world tour was supported by Hoobastank, P.O.D. and Story of the Year. The band played shows at Pellissier Building and Wiltern Theatre on the day before the album release and on the release date. The shows were called "'Meteora' Release Show". The European leg was cancelled because Chester was having severe back and abdominal pains. As a result, half of the music video of "Numb" was shot in Los Angeles and the Czech Republic. The album was also promoted by the Projekt Revolution festival. A live album was released in support of the album titled Live in Texas. Linkin Park played various special shows worldwide, including "Reading Ireland", as well as performing during the Kerrang! Awards, "Livid", "X-103's Not So Silent Night", "The End's Deck The Hall Ball" and "KROQ Almost Acoustic X-Mas", in promotion of the album.

== Critical reception ==
Professional ratings
Aggregate scores
Source	Rating
Metacritic	62/100
Review scores
Source	Rating
AllMusic	4.5/5 stars
Blender	4/5 stars
Dotmusic	8/10
E! Online	A
Entertainment Weekly	B+
The Guardian	3/5 stars
Melodic	3.5/5 stars
NME	7/10
Q	3/5 stars
Rolling Stone	3/5 stars

According to the review aggregator Metacritic, Meteora received "generally favorable reviews" based on a weighted average score of 62 out of 100 from 13 critic scores. E! Online rated it A, and expected it to "shoot straight for the stars". Entertainment Weekly gave the album a B+, calling it a "thunderously hooky album that seamlessly blends the group's disparate sonic elements into radio-friendly perfection." Dot Music described it as a "guaranteed source of ubiquitous radio hits". Rolling Stone said the band "squeezed the last remaining life out of this nearly extinct formula". Billboard Magazine described Meteora as "a ready-made crowdpleaser". NME said it had "massive commercial appeal" but left the reviewer "underwhelmed".

Writing for AllMusic, Stephen Thomas Erlewine described the album as "nothing more and nothing less than a Hybrid Theory part 2.", but added that the band "has discipline and editing skills, keeping this record at a tight 36 minutes and 41 seconds, a move that makes it considerably more listenable than its peers... since they know where to focus their energy, something that many nu-metal bands simply do not." Sputnikmusic writer Damrod criticized the album as being too similar to Hybrid Theory, but praised the album's production quality and catchiness, stating "the songs just invade your brain".

Blender described it as "harder, denser, uglier", while Q described it as "less an artistic endeavor than an exercise in target marketing."

=== Accolades ===
The song "Session" was nominated for a Grammy Award for Best Rock Instrumental Performance in 2004. Single from the album "Somewhere I Belong" won Best Rock Video at the 2003 MTV Video Music Awards. At the 2004 MTV Video Music Awards, "Breaking the Habit" was nominated for Best Rock Video but won MTV Viewer's Choice.

== Commercial performance ==
In its first week, Meteora debuted at number one on the Billboard 200. The album sold 810,400 copies in the US and 36,700 in Canada its first week of release. In its second week, it sold an additional 265,000 copies in the US and stayed at the top for another week. As of June 2014, the album has sold 6.2 million copies in the US, and around 16 million copies worldwide. The album was ranked number 36 on Billboard's Hot 200 Albums of the Decade.

As of April 2023, the album has sold 8.55 million equivalent album units and 6.49 million in pure album sales in the US.

== Track listing ==
All tracks are written by Linkin Park.

No.	Title	Length
1.	"Foreword"	0:13
2.	"Don't Stay"	3:07
3.	"Somewhere I Belong"	3:33
4.	"Lying from You"	2:55
5.	"Hit the Floor"	2:44
6.	"Easier to Run"	3:24
7.	"Faint"	2:42
8.	"Figure.09"	3:17
9.	"Breaking the Habit"	3:16
10.	"From the Inside"	2:55
11.	"Nobody's Listening"	2:58
12.	"Session" (Instrumental)	2:24
13.	"Numb"	3:07
Total length:		36:41

iTunes Deluxe Edition
No.	Title	Length
14.	"Step Up" (Live at Projekt Revolution 2002)	4:14
15.	"Somewhere I Belong" (Live at Milton Keynes)	3:41

Spotify Bonus Edition
No.	Title	Length
14.	"Lying from You" (Live LPU Tour 2003)	3:04
15.	"From the Inside" (Live LPU Tour 2003)	2:55
16.	"Easier to Run" (Live LPU Tour 2003)	3:22

== 20th anniversary edition ==
Meteora 20th Anniversary Edition

Compilation album by Linkin Park
- Released: April 7, 2023
- Recorded: 2002–2004
- Studios: NRG Recording; (North Hollywood, California); Soundtrack; (New York City)
- Genres: Nu metal; rap metal; alternative metal; rap rock; alternative rock
- Labels: Warner; Machine Shop
- Producers: Don Gilmore; Linkin Park

Linkin Park chronology
Hybrid Theory 20th Anniversary Edition (2020)	Meteora 20th Anniversary Edition (2023)	Papercuts (Singles Collection 2000–2023) (2024)

Singles from Meteora20
- 1. "Lost" Released: February 10, 2023; 2. "Fighting Myself" Released: March 24, 2023

In January 2023, the band started teasing the 20th anniversary of Meteora by updating their website, featuring a countdown to February 1, where it was speculated that they would be announcing something related to their second album. By the time that the countdown concluded, the website was updated again in the style of an interactive game that progressed every day up until the announcement of "Lost", on February 6, to commemorate the album's 20th anniversary. The previously unreleased track was released on February 10 as the lead single alongside the official announcement of the 20th anniversary reissue. A second single, also previously unreleased, entitled "Fighting Myself" was released on March 24. The 20th anniversary reissue was released on April 7.

The 20th anniversary super deluxe edition of Meteora, promoted as Meteora20, features the original tracklist; an extended release of Live in Texas, featuring tracks previously omitted from the CD release; a previously unreleased live performance at Nottingham, England in 2003, titled Live in Nottingham 2003; previously released demos for the Linkin Park Underground fan club, titled LPU Rarities 2.0; previously released live recordings, titled Live Rarities 2003–2004; previously unreleased demos, titled Lost Demos; and three DVDs: the first disc feature the previously released The Making of Meteora and The Art of Meteora documentaries, along with a new documentary titled Work in Progress, while the second and third discs feature previously unreleased live performances from 2003 and 2004 respectively. The Deluxe CD features the original Andy Wallace mix of "Lost", called "Lost (2002 Mix)", as the 14th track of the first disc, after "Numb".

Lost Demos was later released on vinyl for Record Store Day Black Friday 2023.

=== Track listing ===
The 20th anniversary edition includes the original album (in CD, vinyl and digital) on disc one.

All tracks are written by Linkin Park, except where noted.

Disc 2 – Live in Texas (vinyl and digital; double album vinyl; vinyl exclusive to super deluxe edition)
No.	Title	Writer(s)	Length
1.	"Don't Stay"		3:19
2.	"Somewhere I Belong"		3:35
3.	"Lying from You"		3:07
4.	"Papercut"		3:06
5.	"Points of Authority"		3:26
6.	"Runaway"	Linkin Park; Mark Wakefield	3:07
7.	"Faint"		2:46
8.	"From the Inside"		3:01
9.	"Figure.09"		3:51
10.	"With You"	Linkin Park; Dust Brothers (Michael Simpson & John King)	3:20
11.	"By Myself"		4:07
12.	"P5hng Me A*Wy"		5:05
13.	"Numb"		3:14
14.	"Crawling"		3:42
15.	"In the End"		4:04
16.	"A Place for My Head"	Linkin Park; Wakefield; Dave Farrell	3:57
17.	"One Step Closer"		4:01
Total length:			58:48

Disc 3 – Live in Nottingham 2003 (vinyl and digital; double album vinyl; vinyl exclusive to super deluxe edition)
No.	Title	Writer(s)	Length
1.	"Session"		1:14
2.	"Don't Stay"		3:16
3.	"Somewhere I Belong"		3:37
4.	"Lying from You"		3:40
5.	"Papercut"		3:06
6.	"Points of Authority"		3:26
7.	"Runaway"	Linkin Park; Wakefield	3:53
8.	"Faint"		2:47
9.	"From the Inside"		2:56
10.	"Hit the Floor"		3:18
11.	"With You"	Linkin Park; Dust Brothers	3:45
12.	"Crawling"		4:00
13.	"In the End"		4:30
14.	"Easier to Run"		4:05
15.	"A Place for My Head"	Linkin Park; Wakefield; Farrell	3:58
16.	"One Step Closer"		4:04
Total length:			52:55

Disc 4 – LPU Rarities 2.0 (CD, vinyl and digital; double album vinyl; vinyl exclusive to vinyl set)
No.	Title	Writer(s)	Original release	Length
1.	"A.06"		LP Underground 2.0	0.54
2.	"Pretty Birdy" ("Somewhere I Belong" 2002 demo)		LP Underground XIII	4:05
3.	"Sold My Soul to Yo Mama"	Chester Bennington; Joe Hahn; Mike Shinoda	LP Underground 4.0	1:58
4.	"Standing in the Middle" (performed by Mike Shinoda and Motion Man)	Shinoda; Paul Laster; Kurt Matlin	LP Underground 4.0	3:21
5.	"Program" (Meteora demo)		LP Underground Eleven	3:31
6.	"Faint" (demo 2002)		LP Underground 9: Demos	3:11
7.	"Figure.09" (demo 2002)		LP Underground 9: Demos	3:23
8.	"Drawing" ("Breaking the Habit" demo 2002)		LP Underground 9: Demos	3:31
9.	"Cumulus" (2002 demo)		LP Underground XIII	3:04
10.	"A-Six" (original long version)		LP Underground 9: Demos	3:51
11.	"Soundtrack" (Meteora demo)		LP Underground Eleven	3:15
12.	"Broken Foot" (Meteora demo)		LP Underground Eleven	2:43
13.	"Ominous" (Meteora demo)		LP Underground 12	3:08
14.	"Unfortunate" (unreleased demo 2002)		LP Underground X: Demos	2:06
15.	"Pepper" (Meteora demo)		LP Underground 12	2:56
16.	"Breaking the Habit" (original Mike 2002 demo)		LP Underground XIV	3:17
17.	"Halo" (unreleased demo 2002)		LP Underground X: Demos	3:42
18.	"Rhinocerous" (2002 demo)		LP Underground XIV	3:35
19.	"Attached" (2003 demo)		LP Underground 15	3:28
Total length:				55:47

Disc 5 – Live Rarities 2003–2004 (CD, vinyl and digital; vinyl exclusive to vinyl set)
No.	Title	Writer(s)	Original release	Length
1.	"Lying from You" (live LPU Tour 2003)		"Faint" single (2003)	3:04
2.	"From the Inside" (live LPU Tour 2003)		"Numb" single (2003)	2:55
3.	"Easier to Run" (live LPU Tour 2003)		"Numb" single (2003)	3:20
4.	"Step Up" (live Projekt Revolution 2002)	Brad Delson; Hahn; Shinoda	"Somewhere I Belong" single (2003)	4:14
5.	"My December" (live Projekt Revolution 2002)	Shinoda	"Somewhere I Belong" single (2003)	4:27
6.	"Crawling" (live Reading Festival 2003)		"Breaking the Habit" single (2004)	3:35
7.	"Breaking the Habit" (live Rock am Ring 2004)		LP Underground 4.0	5:34
8.	"Step Up"/"Nobody's Listening"/"It's Goin' Down" (live)	Linkin Park; Rob Aguilar; Anthony Williams; Keith Bailey; Alvin Joiner; Melvin Jones; Melvin Charles Bradford	LP Underground 4.0	4:57
9.	"Wish" (live Projekt Revolution 2004)	Trent Reznor	LP Underground 4.0	4:28
10.	"One Step Closer" (featuring Jonathan Davis) (live Projekt Revolution 2004)		LP Underground 4.0	3:57
Total length:				38:35

Disc 6 – Lost Demos (CD and digital; CD exclusive to super deluxe edition)
No.	Title	Length
1.	"Lost"	3:19
2.	"Fighting Myself"	3:21
3.	"More the Victim"	2:41
4.	"Massive"	3:08
5.	"Healing Foot"	3:31
6.	"A6" (Meteora20 demo)	3:54
7.	"Cuidado" (Lying from You demo)	3:18
8.	"Husky" (Hit the Floor demo)	3:13
9.	"Interrogation" (Easier to Run demo)	3:40
10.	"Faint" (Meteora20 demo)	3:55
11.	"Plaster 2" (Figure.09 demo)	2:56
12.	"Shifter" (From the Inside demo)	3:24
13.	"Wesside"	3:14
14.	"Resolution"	4:37
Total length:		48:11

DVD 1 – The Making of Meteora (exclusive to super deluxe edition)
No.	Title	Length
1.	"The Making of Meteora"
2.	"The Art of Meteora"
3.	"Work in Progress"

DVD 2 – Veterans Stadium 2003 / Live in Seoul 2003 (exclusive to super deluxe edition)
No.	Title	Length
1.	"Don't Stay" (Veterans Stadium 2003)
2.	"Somewhere I Belong" (Veterans Stadium 2003)
3.	"Lying from You" (Veterans Stadium 2003)
4.	"Papercut" (Veterans Stadium 2003)
5.	"Point of Authority" (Veterans Stadium 2003)
6.	"Runaway" (Veterans Stadium 2003)
7.	"Faint" (Veterans Stadium 2003)
8.	"From the Inside" (Veterans Stadium 2003)
9.	"Figure.09" (Veterans Stadium 2003)
10.	"With You" (Veterans Stadium 2003)
11.	"By Myself" (Veterans Stadium 2003)
12.	"P5hng Me A*Wy" (Veterans Stadium 2003)
13.	"Numb" (Veterans Stadium 2003)
14.	"Crawling" (Veterans Stadium 2003)
15.	"In the End" (Veterans Stadium 2003)
16.	"A Place for My Head" (Veterans Stadium 2003)
17.	"One Step Closer" (Veterans Stadium 2003)
18.	"Don't Stay" (live in Seoul 2003)
19.	"Somewhere I Belong" (live in Seoul 2003)
20.	"Lying from You" (live in Seoul 2003)
21.	"Papercut" (live in Seoul 2003)
22.	"Points of Authority" (live in Seoul 2003)
23.	"Runaway" (live in Seoul 2003)
24.	"Faint" (live in Seoul 2003)
25.	"From the Inside" (live in Seoul 2003)
26.	"Figure.09" (live in Seoul 2003)
27.	"Nobody's Listening" (live in Seoul 2003)
28.	"With You" (live in Seoul 2003)
29.	"By Myself" (live in Seoul 2003)
30.	"P5hng Me A*Wy" (live in Seoul 2003)
31.	"Numb" (live in Seoul 2003)
32.	"Crawling" (live in Seoul 2003)
33.	"In the End" (live in Seoul 2003)
34.	"My December" (live in Seoul 2003)
35.	"A Place for My Head" (live in Seoul 2003)
36.	"One Step Closer" (live in Seoul 2003)

DVD 3 – Live in Manila 2004 / Live in Denver – Projekt Revolution (exclusive to super deluxe edition)
No.	Title	Length
1.	"Don't Stay" (live in Manila 2004)
2.	"Lying from You" (live in Manila 2004)
3.	"Papercut" (live in Manila 2004)
4.	"Points of Authority" (live in Manila 2004)
5.	"With you" (live in Manila 2004)
6.	"Runaway" (live in Manila 2004)
7.	"Step Up"/"Nobody's Listening"/"It's Goin' Down" (live in Manila 2004)
8.	"Somewhere I Belong" (live in Manila 2004)
9.	"From the Inside" (live in Manila 2004)
10.	"Breaking the Habit" (live in Manila 2004)
11.	"Numb" (live in Manila 2004)
12.	"Faint" (live in Manila 2004)
13.	"In the End" (live in Manila 2004)
14.	"A Place for My Head" (live in Manila 2004)
15.	"Crawling" (live in Manila 2004)
16.	"Wish" (Nine Inch Nails cover) (live in Manila 2004)
17.	"One Step Closer" (live in Manila 2004)
18.	"Don't Stay" (live in Denver – Projekt Revolution)
19.	"Lying from You" (live in Denver – Projekt Revolution)
20.	"Papercut" (live in Denver – Projekt Revolution)
21.	"Points of Authority" (live in Denver – Projekt Revolution)
22.	"With You" (live in Denver – Projekt Revolution)
23.	"Runaway" (live in Denver – Projekt Revolution)
24.	"Step Up"/"Nobody's Listening"/"It's Goin' Down" (live in Denver – Projekt Revolution)
25.	"Somewhere I Belong" (live in Denver – Projekt Revolution)
26.	"Figure.09" (live in Denver – Projekt Revolution)
27.	"From the Inside" (live in Denver – Projekt Revolution)
28.	"Breaking the Habit" (live in Denver – Projekt Revolution)
29.	"Numb" (live in Denver – Projekt Revolution)
30.	"Faint" (featuring Bert McCracken) (live in Denver – Projekt Revolution)
31.	"In the End" (live in Denver – Projekt Revolution)
32.	"A Place for My Head" (live in Denver – Projekt Revolution)
33.	"Crawling" (live in Denver – Projekt Revolution)
34.	"Wish" (Nine Inch Nails cover) (live in Denver – Projekt Revolution)
35.	"One Step Closer" (featuring Jonathan Davis) (live in Denver – Projekt Revolution)

Deluxe CD bonus track
No.	Title	Length
14.	"Lost" (2002 mix)	3:19

== Meteora – Live Around the World ==
Meteora – Live Around the World

Live album by Linkin Park
- Released: June 5, 2012
- Recorded: 2007–2011
- Length: 25:27
- Labels: Warner Bros.; Machine Shop
- Producer: Mike Shinoda

Linkin Park chronology
Hybrid Theory – Live Around the World (2012)	Meteora – Live Around the World (2012)	Minutes to Midnight – Live Around the World (2012)

Meteora – Live Around the World is a live album which features live versions of seven songs from the second studio album, Meteora, similar to their prior live release, Hybrid Theory – Live Around the World. They were recorded in various cities around the world from 2007 to 2011. The album was released exclusively on iTunes.

=== Track listing ===
All tracks are written by Linkin Park.

Meteora – Live Around the World
No.	Title	Length
1.	"Don't Stay" (live in Shanghai, 2007; includes "Foreword")	3:16
2.	"Somewhere I Belong" (live in Koln, 2008)	4:09
3.	"Lying from You" (live in New York, 2008)	2:57
4.	"Faint" (live in Hamburg, 2011)	3:41
5.	"Breaking the Habit" (live in Hamburg, 2011)	4:15
6.	"From the Inside" (live in Sydney, 2010)	3:28
7.	"Numb" (live in New York, 2008)	3:41
Total length:		25:27

== Personnel ==
Linkin Park

- Chester Bennington – lead vocals, acoustic guitar intro ("Somewhere I Belong")
- Rob Bourdon – drums, backing vocals
- Brad Delson – lead guitar, backing vocals
- Dave "Phoenix" Farrell – bass, backing vocals
- Joe Hahn – turntables, samples, backing vocals
- Mike Shinoda – rap vocals, samples, strings arrangement ("Faint" & "Breaking the Habit"), rhythm guitar ("Somewhere I Belong", "Easier to Run", "Faint", & "From the Inside"), piano ("Somewhere I Belong", "Session", & "Numb"), keyboard ("Lying from You", "Easier to Run", "Breaking the Habit", "From the Inside", "Figure.09", & "Session")

Additional musicians

- David Campbell – strings arrangement ("Faint" & "Breaking the Habit")
- Joel Derouin, Charlie Bisharat, Alyssa Park, Sara Parkins, Michelle Richards, Mark Robertson – violins
- Evan Wilson, Bob Becker – violas
- Larry Corbett, Dan Smith – cellos
- David Zasloff – shakuhachi flute ("Nobody's Listening")

Production

- Produced by Don Gilmore and Linkin Park
- Recorded by Don Gilmore
- John Ewing Jr. – engineer
- Fox Phelps – assistant engineer
- Andy Wallace – mixing at Soundtrack Studios, New York, NY
- Steve Sisco – mixing assistance
- Brian "Big Bass" Gardner – mastering, digital editing at Bernie Grundman Mastering

Artwork

- Mike Shinoda & The Flem – creative direction
- The Flem – art direction & design
- Delta, Mike Shinoda, Joseph Hahn & The Flem – installation artists
- James R. Minchin III – photography
- Nick Spanos – spray paint can close-up photos

== Charts ==
=== Weekly charts ===
2003 weekly chart performance for Meteora
Chart (2003)	Peak position
Australian Albums (ARIA)	2
Australian Heavy Rock & Metal Albums (ARIA)	1
Austrian Albums (Ö3 Austria)	1
Belgian Albums (Ultratop Flanders)	1
Belgian Albums (Ultratop Wallonia)	1
Canadian Albums (Billboard)	2
Danish Albums (Hitlisten)	3
Dutch Albums (Album Top 100)	2
European Albums (Billboard)	1
Finnish Albums (Suomen virallinen lista)	2
French Albums (SNEP)	3
German Albums (Offizielle Top 100)	1
Greek Albums (IFPI)	2
Hungarian Albums (MAHASZ)	2
Irish Albums (IRMA)	1
Italian Albums (FIMI)	1
Japanese Albums (Oricon)	6
New Zealand Albums (RMNZ)	1
Norwegian Albums (VG-lista)	1
Polish Albums (ZPAV)	3
Portuguese Albums (AFP)	1
Scottish Albums (Official Charts)	2
Spanish Albums (AFYVE)	1
Swedish Albums (Sverigetopplistan)	1
Swiss Albums (Schweizer Hitparade)	1
UK Albums (Official Charts)	1
UK Rock & Metal Albums (Official Charts)	1
US Billboard 200	1

2009 weekly chart performance for Meteora
Chart (2009)	Peak position
Mexican Albums (Top 100 Mexico)	98

2017 weekly chart performance for Meteora
Chart (2017)	Peak position
Australian Albums (ARIA)	5
Austrian Albums (Ö3 Austria)	11
Canadian Albums (Billboard)	12
Czech Albums (ČNS IFPI)	11
Danish Albums (Hitlisten)	14
Finnish Albums (Suomen virallinen lista)	22
German Albums (Offizielle Top 100)	15
Irish Albums (IRMA)	11
Italian Albums (FIMI)	13
New Zealand Albums (RMNZ)	13
Norwegian Albums (VG-lista)	26
Polish Albums (ZPAV)	16
Portuguese Albums (AFP)	26
Scottish Albums (Official Charts)	12
Swedish Albums (Sverigetopplistan)	14
Swiss Albums (Romandie)	13
Swiss Albums (Schweizer Hitparade)	13
UK Albums (Official Charts)	7
UK Rock & Metal Albums (Official Charts)	2
US Billboard 200	11
US Top Alternative Albums (Billboard)	4
US Top Catalog Albums (Billboard)	2
US Top Hard Rock Albums (Billboard)	2
US Top Rock Albums (Billboard)	3
US Indie Store Album Sales (Billboard)	18

2021 weekly chart performance for Meteora
Chart (2021)	Peak position
Croatian International Albums (HDU)	3

2025 weekly chart performance for Meteora
Chart (2025)	Peak position
Norwegian Rock Albums (IFPI Norge)	5

Weekly chart performance for Meteora: 20th Anniversary Edition
Chart (2023)	Peak position
Austrian Albums (Ö3 Austria)	1
Canadian Albums (Billboard)	10
German Albums (Offizielle Top 100)	1
Hungarian Albums (MAHASZ)	1
Portuguese Albums (AFP)	1
UK Albums (Official Charts)	7
US Top Alternative Albums (Billboard)	2
US Top Catalog Albums (Billboard)	1
US Top Rock Albums (Billboard)	1
US Billboard 200	8

=== Year-end charts ===
2003 year-end chart performance for Meteora
Chart (2003)	Position
Australian Albums (ARIA)	14
Australian Heavy Rock & Metal Albums (ARIA)	1
Austrian Albums (Ö3 Austria)	14
Belgian Albums (Ultratop Flanders)	14
Belgian Alternative Albums (Ultratop Flanders)	7
Belgian Albums (Ultratop Wallonia)	10
Danish Albums (Hitlisten)	31
Dutch Albums (Album Top 100)	42
European Albums (Billboard)	6
Finnish Albums (Suomen virallinen lista)	17
French Albums (SNEP)	26
German Albums (Offizielle Top 100)	7
Hungarian Albums (MAHASZ)	23
Italian Albums (FIMI)	27
Japanese Albums (Oricon)	82
New Zealand Albums (RMNZ)	20
Swedish Albums (Sverigetopplistan)	31
Swedish Albums & Compilations (Sverigetopplistan)	41
Swiss Albums (Schweizer Hitparade)	8
UK Albums (OCC)	35
US Billboard 200	6
Worldwide Albums (IFPI)	3

2004 year-end chart performance for Meteora
Chart (2004)	Position
Australian Albums (ARIA)	63
French Albums (SNEP)	92
German Albums (Offizielle Top 100)	59
New Zealand Albums (RMNZ)	23
US Billboard 200	33

2005 year-end chart performance for Meteora
Chart (2005)	Position
Belgian Midprice Albums (Ultratop Wallonia)	35
US Billboard 200	199

2007 year-end chart performance for Meteora
Chart (2007)	Position
Belgian Midprice Albums (Ultratop Wallonia)	37

2017 year-end chart performance for Meteora
Chart (2017)	Position
US Alternative Albums (Billboard)	36
US Top Rock Albums (Billboard)	46

2020 year-end chart performance for Meteora
Chart (2020)	Position
US Hard Rock Albums (Billboard)	17

2021 year-end chart performance for Meteora
Chart (2021)	Position
US Hard Rock Albums (Billboard)	16

2022 year-end chart performance for Meteora
Chart (2022)	Position
US Hard Rock Albums (Billboard)	17

2023 year-end chart performance for Meteora
Chart (2023)	Position
Australian Albums (ARIA)	85
Austrian Albums (Ö3 Austria)	50
Belgian Albums (Ultratop Flanders)	65
Belgian Albums (Ultratop Wallonia)	81
German Albums (Offizielle Top 100)	24
Hungarian Albums (MAHASZ)	58
Polish Albums (ZPAV)	80
Swiss Albums (Schweizer Hitparade)	77
US Billboard 200	172
US Top Rock Albums (Billboard)	25

2024 year-end chart performance of Meteora
Chart (2024)	Position
Australian Albums (ARIA)	80
Austrian Albums (Ö3 Austria)	33
Belgian Albums (Ultratop Flanders)	65
Belgian Albums (Ultratop Wallonia)	75
German Albums (Offizielle Top 100)	12
Hungarian Albums (MAHASZ)	44
Polish Albums (ZPAV)	66
Swedish Albums (Sverigetopplistan)	93
Swiss Albums (Schweizer Hitparade)	76

2025 year-end chart performance of Meteora
Chart (2025)	Position
Australian Albums (ARIA)	99
Austrian Albums (Ö3 Austria)	11
Belgian Albums (Ultratop Flanders)	32
Belgian Albums (Ultratop Wallonia)	54
Dutch Albums (Album Top 100)	56
German Albums (Offizielle Top 100)	6
Hungarian Albums (MAHASZ)	37
Polish Albums (ZPAV)	58
Swedish Albums (Sverigetopplistan)	73
Swiss Albums (Schweizer Hitparade)	42
US Billboard 200	117

=== Decade-end charts ===
Decade-end chart performance for Meteora
Chart (2000–2009)	Position
Australian Albums (ARIA)	98
US Billboard 200	36

== Certifications and sales ==
Certifications and sales for Meteora
Region	Certification	Certified units/sales
Argentina (CAPIF)	Gold	20,000^{^}
Australia (ARIA)	4× Platinum	280,000^{^}
Austria (IFPI Austria)	Platinum	30,000^{*}
Belgium (BRMA)	Gold	25,000^{*}
Brazil (Pro-Música Brasil)	Platinum	125,000^{*}
Canada (Music Canada)	7× Platinum	700,000^{‡}
Czech Republic	—	15,000
Denmark (IFPI Danmark)	5× Platinum	100,000^{‡}
Finland (Musiikkituottajat)	Gold	15,938
France (SNEP)	2× Platinum	400,000^{*}
Germany (BVMI)	5× Platinum	1,000,000^{‡}
Greece (IFPI Greece)	Platinum	20,000^{^}
Hungary (MAHASZ)	Gold	10,000^{^}
Italy (FIMI) sales since 2009	2× Platinum	100,000^{‡}
Japan (RIAJ)	Platinum	200,000^{^}
Mexico (AMPROFON)	Gold	75,000^{^}
New Zealand (RMNZ)	5× Platinum	75,000^{‡}
Poland (ZPAV)	Platinum	40,000^{*}
Portugal (AFP)	Gold	20,000^{^}
Russia (NFPF)	Gold	10,000^{*}
Singapore (RIAS)	Platinum	10,000^{*}
South Korea	—	75,247
Spain (Promusicae)	Platinum	100,000^{^}
Sweden (GLF)	Gold	30,000^{^}
Switzerland (IFPI Switzerland)	Platinum	40,000^{^}
United Kingdom (BPI)	4× Platinum	1,200,000^{‡}
United States (RIAA)	Diamond	10,000,000^{‡}
Summaries
Europe (IFPI)	3× Platinum	3,000,000^{*}
^{*} Sales figures based on certification alone.^{^} Shipments figures based on certification alone.^{‡} Sales+streaming figures based on certification alone.
