= Lost (Linkin Park song) =

2023 single by Linkin Park

- PLZ Tethered Remix cover art

Single by Linkin Park

from the album Meteora20
- Released: February 10, 2023
- Recorded: 2002
- Genre: Nu metal; hard rock; electronic rock
- Length: 3:19
- Label: Warner
- Songwriters: Brad Delson; Chester Bennington; Mike Shinoda; Rob Bourdon; Dave Farrell; Joe Hahn
- Producers: Linkin Park; Don Gilmore

Linkin Park singles chronology
"She Couldn't" (2020)	"Lost" (2023)	"Fighting Myself" (2023)

Music video
- "Lost" on YouTube

"Lost" is a song by American rock band Linkin Park. Originally recorded during sessions for their second studio album, Meteora (2003), it was later officially released on February 10, 2023, as the lead single from the album's 20th-anniversary reissue.

The song was included in the setlist for the band's From Zero World Tour in 2024 and 2025.

== Background ==
The song was initially recorded in 2002 to be featured on Linkin Park's second studio album, Meteora (2003). It had been fully formed at the time, mixed and mastered along with the other songs on the album, but held from the album's tracklist and shelved because the band considered "Lost" to be too similar to "Numb". After the band hinted at releasing material in the second half of January 2023 by teasing countdowns and scavenger hunts on their website, the song was officially released on February 10, 2023, in promotion of the band's 20th anniversary re-release of Meteora.

Mike Shinoda wrote, "Finding 'Lost' was like finding a favorite photo you had forgotten you'd taken, like it was waiting for the right moment to reveal itself". According to Shinoda, fans had been asking for songs containing the late lead vocalist Chester Bennington's voice for years, and stated that "Lost" is one of multiple unreleased tracks featuring Bennington's vocals to be included on the 20th anniversary edition of Meteora.

== Composition ==
"Lost" has been described as nu metal and a hard rock song with electronic elements. It was noted that "Lost" is sonically similar to "Breaking the Habit" and "Numb". Jason Lipshutz of Billboard described the song as a "haunting hard rock anthem" and retrospectively commented that it is "classic Linkin Park, an electro-rock anthem buoyed by Chester Bennington’s singular voice."

== Music video ==
The band released an anime-inspired AI-generated video for the song on February 10, 2023. It features clips from the Live in Texas performance, The Making of Meteora documentary, the "New Divide", "Somewhere I Belong", "Breaking the Habit", and Mike Shinoda's "Fine" music videos, and Maciej Kuciara and pplpleasr's animation "White Rabbit". It was created by producers and animators Maciej Kuciara and pplpleasr. It was nominated for Best Rock Video at the 2023 MTV Video Music Awards.

== Live performances ==
Following a lengthy hiatus after Bennington's death in 2017, Linkin Park reformed with new members Emily Armstrong and Colin Brittain, and announced their comeback with the new members and new album From Zero (2024) through a livestreamed concert at Warner Bros. Studios Burbank on September 5, 2024. A brief piano version of "Lost" was performed during the concert, with Armstrong in lead vocals, marking the song's live debut in any capacity. On January 31, 2025, in Mexico City, the whole band performed the full version of the song (with first verse and chorus performed acoustically, with Mike on keyboard and Emily on vocals, before the rest of the band joined in before the second verse).

== Track listing ==
Digital download
No.	Title	Length
1.	"Lost"	3:19

Digital download (remix)
No.	Title	Length
1.	"Lost" (PLZ Tethered Version)	3:22
2.	"Lost"	3:19
Total length:		6:42

Deluxe CD excl. bonus track
No.	Title	Length
14.	"Lost (2002 Mix)"	3:19

== Personnel ==
Linkin Park

- Chester Bennington – lead vocals
- Mike Shinoda – rap and backing vocals, keyboards, sampler
- Brad Delson – guitars
- Joe Hahn – turntables, samples
- Rob Bourdon – drums
- Dave Farrell – bass guitar

== Charts ==
=== Weekly charts ===
Weekly chart performance for "Lost"
Chart (2023)	Peak position
Australia (ARIA)	49
Austria (Ö3 Austria Top 40)	9
Canada (Canadian Hot 100)	28
Canada Rock (Billboard)	1
Czech Republic Airplay (ČNS IFPI)	2
Czech Republic Singles Digital (ČNS IFPI)	17
Finland (Suomen virallinen lista)	24
France (SNEP)	132
France Radio (SNEP)	2
Germany (GfK)	5
Germany Rock Airplay (GfK)	6
Global 200 (Billboard)	18
Greece International (IFPI)	21
Hungary (Single Top 40)	4
Hungary (Stream Top 40)	30
Ireland (IRMA)	51
Italy Airplay (FIMI)	65
Japan Hot Overseas (Billboard)	20
Latvia (LAIPA)	5
Lithuania (AGATA)	33
Luxembourg (Billboard)	15
Netherlands (Dutch Top 40)	37
Netherlands (Single Top 100)	98
New Zealand Hot Singles (RMNZ)	2
Portugal (AFP)	59
Russia Airplay (TopHit)	96
Slovakia Singles Digital (ČNS IFPI)	43
Sweden Heatseeker (Sverigetopplistan)	7
Switzerland (Schweizer Hitparade)	16
UK Singles (Official Charts)	18
UK Rock & Metal (Official Charts)	1
US Billboard Hot 100	38
US Hot Rock & Alternative Songs (Billboard)	4
US Rock & Alternative Airplay (Billboard)	1

=== Year-end charts ===
Year-end chart performance for "Lost"
Chart (2023)	Position
US Digital Song Sales (Billboard)	74
US Hot Rock & Alternative Songs (Billboard)	18
US Rock Airplay (Billboard)	1

Chart (2024)	Position
US Hot Hard Rock Songs (Billboard)	5
US Rock Airplay (Billboard)	9

== Certifications ==
Certifications for "Lost"
Region	Certification	Certified units/sales
France (SNEP)	Platinum	200,000^{‡}
Germany (BVMI)	Gold	300,000^{‡}
New Zealand (RMNZ)	Gold	15,000^{‡}
United Kingdom (BPI)	Silver	200,000^{‡}
^{‡} Sales+streaming figures based on certification alone.

== Release history ==
Release history and formats for "Lost"
Region	Date	Format	Label	Ref.
Various	February 10, 2023	Digital download; streaming	Warner	
Italy	February 10, 2023	Radio airplay	Warner	
United States	February 14, 2023	Alternative radio; rock radio	Warner	
