= Hybrid Theory =

2000 studio album by Linkin Park

Studio album by Linkin Park
- Released: October 24, 2000
- Recorded: March–July 2000
- Studio: NRG (Los Angeles)
- Genres: Nu metal; rap metal; rap rock
- Length: 37:45
- Label: Warner Bros.
- Producer: Don Gilmore

Linkin Park chronology
Hybrid Theory EP (1999)	Hybrid Theory (2000)	Reanimation (2002)

Singles from Hybrid Theory
- 1. "One Step Closer" Released: August 29, 2000; 2. "Crawling" Released: April 2, 2001; 3. "Papercut" Released: June 18, 2001; 4. "In the End" Released: September 11, 2001

Hybrid Theory is the debut studio album by the American rock band Linkin Park, released on October 24, 2000, by Warner Bros. Records. Recorded at NRG Recordings in North Hollywood, California, and produced by Don Gilmore, the album's lyrical themes deal with problems lead vocalist Chester Bennington experienced during his adolescence, including drug abuse and the constant fighting and eventual divorce of his parents. Hybrid Theory takes its title from the previous name of the band as well as the concepts of music theory and combining different styles. It is also the band's only album in which bassist Dave "Phoenix" Farrell does not play, though he was credited as a band member and was a songwriter on two tracks.

Four singles were released from Hybrid Theory: "One Step Closer", "In the End", "Crawling" and "Papercut", all of which launched Linkin Park into mainstream popularity. While "In the End" was the most successful of the four, all of the singles in the album remain some of the band's most successful songs to date. Although "Runaway", "Points of Authority", and "My December" from the special edition bonus disc album were not released as singles, they were minor hits on alternative rock radio stations thanks to the success of all of the band's singles and the album.

Generally receiving positive reviews from critics upon its release, Hybrid Theory became a strong commercial success. Peaking at number two on the US Billboard 200, it is certified 12× Platinum by the Recording Industry Association of America (RIAA). It also reached the top 10 in 15 other countries and has sold 32 million copies worldwide, making it the best-selling debut album since Guns N' Roses's Appetite for Destruction (1987) and one of the best-selling albums of all time. It is the second best selling rock album of the 21st century in the United Kingdom. At the 44th Grammy Awards, it won Best Hard Rock Performance for "Crawling". On August 13, 2020, Warner Records announced a re-release of Hybrid Theory for its 20th anniversary. A previously unreleased demo song, "She Couldn't", was released at the same time.

== Background ==
High school friends Mike Shinoda, Brad Delson and Rob Bourdon formed the rap rock band Xero in 1996. After their graduation, they recruited Joe Hahn, Dave "Phoenix" Farrell and Mark Wakefield to perform in the band. Though limited in resources, the band began recording and producing songs within Shinoda's makeshift bedroom studio in 1996, resulting in a four-track demo album, entitled Xero, released in November 1997. Delson, who by that point was a student at UCLA, then introduced the band to Jeff Blue, the vice president of A&R for Zomba Music, whom he had interned for in college. Blue immediately took interest in the band, but this did not produce a record deal. After watching a Xero performance in 1998, he believed the band needed a different vocalist. Frustrated with the lack of label success, Wakefield and Farrell left the band.

Blue recommended Arizona-based vocalist Chester Bennington, formerly of Grey Daze. Blue called Bennington on March 20, 1999, his 23rd birthday, and sent him tapes of Xero's unreleased recordings the following day. One contained vocals by Wakefield, and the other consisted of only the instrumental tracks — with Blue asking for Bennington's "interpretation of the songs". Bennington wrote and recorded new vocals over the instrumentals and sent the tapes back to Blue. By March 23, Bennington was in Los Angeles auditioning for Xero. The band auditioned numerous people for the vocalist job, with Shinoda later admitting the group's visual impression of Bennington initially led to concerns about his image, though Bennington clearly was the best performer among the candidates. As Delson recalls, "[Bennington] really was kind of the final piece of the puzzle [...] We didn't see anything close to his talent in anybody else."

After Bennington officially got the job, the five members renamed the band Hybrid Theory. Bassist Kyle Christner was then recruited on a temporary basis. The band with these members released the self-titled EP Hybrid Theory. Through a street team, the EP was mainly promoted through internet chat-rooms and forums. In October 1999, Christner left the group. The vacancy was filled by Scott Koziol and Ian Hornbeck, who alongside Delson all contributed bass tracks for the band's recordings. Still unsigned, the band once again turned to Blue, who by that point had left Zomba and had become vice president of Warner Bros. Records; by November 1999, the band had been signed to a contract. The band changed their name again, deciding on "Linkin Park".

== Writing and recording ==
The music that would ultimately become the Hybrid Theory album was first produced by Linkin Park in 1999 as a nine-track demo tape. The band sent this tape to various recording companies and played forty-two different showcases for recording industry representatives, including performances for Los Angeles promoter and impresario, Mike Galaxy's showcase at The Gig on Melrose. However, they were initially turned down by most of the major labels and several independent record labels. The band was signed by Warner Bros. Records in 1999, due in large part to the constant recommendations of Blue, who had joined the label after resigning from Zomba.

Despite initial difficulties in finding a producer willing to take charge of the debut album of a newly signed band, Don Gilmore ultimately agreed to head up the project, with Andy Wallace hired as the mixer. Recording sessions, which mostly involved re-recording the songs off the demo tape, began at NRG Recordings in North Hollywood, California in March 2000 and lasted four months. Shinoda's rapping sections in most of the songs were significantly altered from the original, while most choruses remained largely unchanged. Due to the absence of Dave Farrell and Kyle Christner, who took part in the 1999 extended play, the band hired Scott Koziol and Ian Hornbeck as stand-in bassists; Delson also played bass throughout most of the album. The Dust Brothers provided additional beats for the track "With You".

Shinoda and Bennington wrote the lyrics of Hybrid Theory based in part on early demos with Mark Wakefield. Shinoda characterized the lyrics as interpretations of universal feelings, emotions, and experiences, and as "everyday emotions you talk about and think about." Bennington later described the songwriting experience to Rolling Stone in early 2002:

It's easy to fall into that thing — 'poor, poor me', that's where songs like 'Crawling' come from: I can't take myself. But that song is about taking responsibility for your actions. I don't say 'you' at any point. It's about how I'm the reason that I feel this way. There's something inside me that pulls me down.

== Composition ==
The music of Hybrid Theory draws from diverse inspirations. Bennington's singing style is influenced by acts such as Depeche Mode and Stone Temple Pilots, while the riffs and playing techniques of guitarist Brad Delson are modeled after Deftones, Guns N' Roses, U2, and The Smiths. The lyrical content of the songs primarily touches upon the problems that Bennington encountered during his childhood, including constant and excessive drug and alcohol abuse, the divorce of his parents, isolation, disappointments, and the aftermath feelings of failed relationships. Stylistically, the album has mostly been described as nu metal, rap metal, or rap rock, but sometimes also as alternative metal, alternative rock, or hard rock.

The album eventually produced four singles. "One Step Closer", the album's second track and first single, was gradually recorded in increments after Linkin Park struggled with "Runaway", and features a guitar riff and electronic percussion in the introduction transitioning into a bridge with distortion-heavy guitars and aggressive drums. It is also famous for the "Shut up when I'm talkin' to you!" refrain screamed by Bennington one minute and 48 seconds into the song. The music video for "One Step Closer" was shot in a Los Angeles subway and became an instant hit, eventually receiving heavy rotation on MTV and other music television networks. Stand-in bassist Scott Koziol is shown performing with the band in the video.

"Papercut"
A 41-second sample of "Papercut", the third single from Hybrid Theory. The song describes paranoia. The song shows Mike Shinoda's rapping in the verses, as well as Chester Bennington partially rapping over the chorus.

"In the End"
Sample of "In the End", the fourth single from Hybrid Theory. The song began with a memorable piano riff which was joined with Shinoda's rapping which dominated the verses of the song.

The second single was "Crawling", which Bennington described as "about feeling like I had no control over myself in terms of drugs and alcohol."

"Papercut" was the album's third single, and its lyrics describe paranoia. The music video for "Papercut" features the band performing in a hallway opposite a completely dark room on the walls of which are scribbled the song's lyrics. Various supernatural themes are present in the video, and special effects are used to create eerie renditions, such as the "stretching" of Shinoda's fingers and the "melting" of Bourdon's face.

The fourth and final single to come from Hybrid Theory was "In the End", released on October 9, 2001. The song prominently features a signature piano riff performed by Shinoda. His rapping also dominates the verses of the song and is later joined by Bennington's vocals in the chorus. The music video for "In the End" was shot at various stops along the 2001 Ozzfest tour and was directed by Nathan "Karma" Cox and the band's DJ Joe Hahn, who would go on to direct many of Linkin Park's future videos (the two also directed the music video for "Papercut"). Although the background for the "In the End" video was filmed in a California desert, the band itself performed on a studio stage in Los Angeles, with prominent CGI effects and compositing being used to create the finished version. Performing on a studio stage allowed Hahn and Cox to set off water pipes above the stage near the end and drench the band. The music video won the Best Rock Video award at the 2002 MTV Video Music Awards.

"Points of Authority", the fourth track on the album, was not released as an official single. However, a music video was filmed for it which can be found on Frat Party at the Pankake Festival, the band's first DVD. Drummer Rob Bourdon describes the recording process of the song: "Brad wrote this riff, then went home. Mike decided to cut it up into different pieces and rearranged them on the computer [...] Brad had to learn his own part from the computer." Regarding the song, Delson praised Shinoda's skill, describing him as "a genius" and "Trent Reznor-talented".

The Japanese version of the album includes the bonus tracks "My December" and "High Voltage", both of which are departures from the aggressive sound of the rest of the album. "My December" was originally conceived for the KROQ Almost Acoustic Christmas concert in 2000, where it debuted and its first recording took place; the song touches on the subject of homesickness while touring, and Shinoda wrote the song in about two hours. "High Voltage" is a hip-hop track featuring almost no guitar, and was re-recorded from the band's self-titled EP. Originally, Hybrid Theory was to have 13 tracks, with "High Voltage" slotted into the twelfth track between "Cure for the Itch" and "Pushing Me Away". Warner Bros. was already nervous about Linkin Park's sonic ambitions, and viewed the inclusion of "High Voltage" in the final track listing as a significant risk. The band was asked to choose between keeping the song or Shinoda's rap verses on "In The End", and the group opted to omit "High Voltage" from the standard edition of the album. "High Voltage" has been described as a fan-favorite among Shinoda's individual work. Both "My December" and "High Voltage" also appeared as B-sides on international versions of the "One Step Closer" single.

== Artwork ==
With Hybrid Theory being Linkin Park's first album, Mike Shinoda, who had worked as a graphic designer before becoming a professional musician, has stated that the band had looked through books for inspiration on how to present themselves for the first time. The result was a winged-soldier which Shinoda illustrated himself. According to Chester Bennington, the idea of the soldier with dragonfly wings was to describe the blending of hard and soft musical elements by the use of the jaded looks of the soldier and frail touches of the wings. The art style was largely influenced by stencil graffiti, including early works by Banksy. The cover also features scrambled lyrics of the album's songs within the background, though the lyrics of "One Step Closer" are the most prominent.

== Tours ==
Following the success of Hybrid Theory, Linkin Park received invitations to perform at various rock concerts and tours, including Ozzfest, the Family Values Tour, KROQ-FM's Almost Acoustic Christmas, and the band's self-created tour, Projekt Revolution, which was headlined by Linkin Park and featured other bands such as Cypress Hill and Adema. During this time, Linkin Park reunited with their original bassist, Dave "Phoenix" Farrell. The band kept an online journal on their official website throughout their 2001 and 2002 touring regime, in which each band member made a respective notation. Although the notes are no longer on their website, they are available on fansites. Linkin Park played 324 shows in 2001.

== Reception ==
=== Critical reception ===
Professional ratings
Review scores
Source	Rating
AllMusic	5/5 stars
Classic Rock	6/10
Kerrang!	5/5
Melodic	4.5/5 stars
Melody Maker	4/5 stars
NME	6/10
Pitchfork	7.6/10
Q	4/5 stars
Rolling Stone	2.5/5 stars
The Rolling Stone Album Guide	3.5/5 stars

Hybrid Theory received generally positive reviews from critics. Mike Ross of Jam! praised the album as an effective fusion of hip-hop and heavy metal music and deemed Linkin Park "one of the finest new rap metal bands". PopMatters reviewer Stephanie Dickison wrote that they are "a far more complex and talented group than the hard rock boy bands of late" and "will continue to fascinate and challenge music's standard sounds." In Q, Dan Silver commented that the band had given "angst-ridden rock... an effective electronic spin". Johan Wippsson from Melodic complimented Don Gilmore's production and described Hybrid Theory as "destructive and angry but always with a well controlled melodic feeling all over." The Village Voice's Robert Christgau gave the album a two-star honorable mention rating and cited "Papercut" and "Points of Authority" as highlights; he quipped, "the men don't know what the angry boys understand".

In a more critical assessment, William Ruhlmann of AllMusic found that on Hybrid Theory, Linkin Park sound "like a Johnny-come-lately to an already overdone musical style." NME critic Noel Gardner said that it was a "decent" album in need of editing, writing that "otherwise damn fine soaring emo-crunchers like 'With You' and 'A Place for My Head' are pointlessly jazzed up with tokenistic scratching". Rolling Stone's Matt Diehl felt that the album "works in spots" and the band "knows its way around a hook", but panned Bennington and Shinoda's "corny, boilerplate-aggro lyrics".

Reviewing Hybrid Theory in 2006, Tyler Fisher of Sputnikmusic perceived a lack of musical variety on the record, but concluded that it "stands as a defining mainstream album at the turn of the century, and for good reason." Writing for Stylus Magazine the following year, Ian Cohen found that while the album is "almost completely forgettable" outside of its singles, it "was strangely fresh for mainstream rock radio, particularly placed in relief of its ugly post-grunge peers and the staunch revivalism of the Strokes/White Stripes front." Pitchfork's Gabriel Szatan was more enthusiastic in a 2020 review; he wrote that "all the band's sharpest tendencies meshed and their less attractive aesthetic impulses were suppressed" on Hybrid Theory, while crediting the band with helping to normalize discussion of mental health "within pop, rock, rap, and every genre along the heavy axis". Luke Morton of Kerrang! argued that it is "not hyperbolic to say that Hybrid Theory is one of the most important rock albums of all time."

=== Accolades ===
At the 44th Grammy Awards in 2002, Linkin Park won Best Hard Rock Performance for their song "Crawling". Additional nominations for Best New Artist and Best Rock Album lost out to Alicia Keys and All That You Can't Leave Behind by U2. Hybrid Theory found itself in several "must have" lists that were compiled by various music publications, networks, and other media. In 2012, Rock Sound named Hybrid Theory the best modern classic album of the last 15 years. In 2013, Loudwire ranked it at No. 10 in its Best Hard Rock Debut Albums list, and later in 2024 it also ranked it as the best hard rock album of 2000.

In recent years, Hybrid Theory has routinely appeared in various "best-of" listicles focused on the nu metal genre. In 2018, readers of Revolver voted Hybrid Theory as the greatest nu metal album of all time. In 2021, the staff of Revolver included the album in their list of the "20 Essential Nu-Metal Albums". In 2025, Rae Lemeshow-Barooshian of Loudwire included the album in her list of "the top 50 nu-metal albums of all time", ranking it third.

Some of the more prominent of these lists to feature Hybrid Theory are shown below:

Publication	Country	Accolade	Year	Rank
The Village Voice	United States	Pazz & Jop	2001	159
The National Association of Recording Merchandisers (NARM) / Rock and Roll Hall of Fame	United States	The Definitive 200	2007	84
1001 Albums You Must Hear Before You Die	United States	1001 Albums You Must Hear Before You Die	2006	*
Record Collector	United Kingdom	Best of 2001	2001	*
Rock Sound	United States	101 Modern Classic Albums of the last 15 years	2012	1
Rock Hard	Germany	The 500 Greatest Rock & Metal Albums of All Time	2005	421
Kerrang!	United Kingdom	50 Best Rock Albums of the 2000s	2014	8
Metal Hammer	United Kingdom	Top 20 Best Metal Albums of 2000	2020	*

* denotes an unordered list

== Commercial performance ==
Hybrid Theory debuted at number 16 on the US Billboard 200, selling 50,000 copies in its first week. It was certified gold by the Recording Industry Association of America (RIAA) five weeks after its release. In 2001, the album had sold 4.8 million copies in the United States, making it the best-selling album of the year, and it was estimated that the album continued selling 100,000 copies per week in early 2002. Throughout the following years, the album continued to sell at a fast pace and was eventually certified Diamond by the Recording Industry Association of America in 2005 for shipment of ten million copies in the United States; in 2017, it was awarded another level of platinum status for a total of 11× Platinum. In 2001 the album was the second best-selling album globally, selling 8.5 million copies. To date, the album has sold 27 million copies worldwide, which makes it one of the best-selling albums of all time. As of September 2020, the album has been certified 12× Platinum (Diamond) and has sold 10.5 million copies in the United States per Nielsen SoundScan. As of April 2023 the album has sold 13.58 million equivalent album units and 11 million in pure album sales in the US.

After the death of Bennington on July 20, 2017, the album reached number 1 on the iTunes and Amazon music charts. It also re-entered at No. 27 on the Billboard 200, along with three of their other studio albums, re-surfacing into the top 10 at No. 8 the following week. In the UK, it peaked at No. 4 in 2001 and re-climbed to its peak position in July 2017, the same week it re-entered the top 10 in the US. The album also charted in 11 other countries at fairly high positions and ranked among the top ten in the charts of the United Kingdom, Sweden, New Zealand, Austria, Finland, and Switzerland.

Hybrid Theory was the 11th best performing album on the Billboard 200 during the decade, the album reached the top ten in its 38th week on the chart and stayed in the top ten for 34 weeks. The album spent nearly 170 weeks on the chart as of 2017, by re-entering at No. 167 in February 2011 and for several weeks every time a new studio album was released.

Later in 2002, Linkin Park released the remix album Reanimation. It included the songs of Hybrid Theory remixed and reinterpreted by nu metal and underground hip-hop artists. Contributors to the album included Black Thought, Pharoahe Monch, Jonathan Davis, Stephen Carpenter, and Aaron Lewis. The sound of later Linkin Park albums would involve experimentation with classical instruments such as strings and piano, both of which, along with the same elements of electronica from Hybrid Theory, are prominently included in the band's second studio album Meteora. As Shinoda explains the difference in the sound between Hybrid Theory and Meteora: "That electronic element has always been there in the band – it's just that sometimes we bring it closer to the front."

=== Singles ===
According to Billboard, as of 2022, Hybrid Theory is one of the 15 best-performing 21st-century albums without any of its singles being number-one hits on the Billboard Hot 100. Hybrid Theory was released in the United States on October 24, 2000, following radio airplay of "One Step Closer". Four singles from the album were released throughout 2001 (though "Points of Authority" was released as a promotional single), three of which were chart successes on the US Billboard Modern Rock Tracks charts. The single "In the End" was the highest-charting single from the album, which peaked at number two on the Modern Rock Tracks charts and appearing on charts worldwide. The success of "In the End" was partly responsible for Hybrid Theory's chart success; it reached No. 2 in the Billboard 200 in 2002.

== 20th anniversary edition ==
Hybrid Theory 20th Anniversary Edition

Compilation album by Linkin Park
- Released: October 9, 2020
- Recorded: 1997–2002
- Studios: NRG Recording; (North Hollywood, California)
- Genres: Nu metal; rap metal; alternative metal; rap rock; alternative rock; hard rock
- Labels: Warner Bros.; Machine Shop
- Producers: Don Gilmore; Mike Shinoda

Linkin Park chronology
One More Light Live (2017)	Hybrid Theory 20th Anniversary Edition (2020)	Meteora 20th Anniversary Edition (2023)

Singles from Hybrid Theory 20th Anniversary Edition
- 1. "She Couldn't" Released: August 13, 2020; 2. "In The End (Demo)" Released: October 1, 2020

In preparation of the 20th anniversary of the release of the album, the band asked their fans to submit pictures and videos in relation to Hybrid Theory in celebration. On August 7, the band's official website went under a temporary redesign resembling an early 2000s computer theme, leaving behind clues and puzzles hidden within the website hinting at a re-release of the album, including old emails, pictures, and codes. The website was updated frequently leading up to the announcement of the 20th anniversary re-release on August 13; a previously unreleased song, "She Couldn't" was released on the same day.

Pre-orders for the album went live with announcement of the contents of its release. It contains various content from the Hybrid Theory era, including the original album, the band's remix album Reanimation, Hybrid Theory EP, and various B-sides, demos, live tracks, and remixes. Most of the tracks have been previously released on singles, extended plays, and via the Linkin Park Underground fan club, while other tracks were released for the first time on this compilation. Various editions of the release were offered, including on CDs and vinyl. It was released on October 9, 2020.

In addition to the music, the super deluxe edition of the release includes additional bonus content including three DVDs, art prints, and an 80-page book which includes never before seen pictures. One of the three DVDs had been previously released on November 20, 2001, during the promotion of Hybrid Theory, documenting the band's time on the road, titled Frat Party at the Pankake Festival. The other two DVDs were exclusively released for the first time on the super deluxe edition.

A digital counterpart of the compilation was also released, including the music only, containing a total of 80 tracks.

In November 2023, Kyle Christner, who played bass guitar on the Hybrid Theory EP, filed a lawsuit against Linkin Park, seeking compensation for songs that appeared on the 20th anniversary release of the album. The two parties reached an undisclosed settlement in March 2024.

== Track listing ==
=== Original release ===
All tracks are written by Linkin Park (Chester Bennington, Rob Bourdon, Brad Delson, Joe Hahn, Mike Shinoda), except where noted.

No.	Title	Writer(s)	Length
1.	"Papercut"		3:04
2.	"One Step Closer"		2:37
3.	"With You"	Linkin Park; Dust Brothers	3:23
4.	"Points of Authority"		3:20
5.	"Crawling"		3:28
6.	"Runaway"	Linkin Park; Mark Wakefield	3:03
7.	"By Myself"		3:09
8.	"In the End"		3:36
9.	"A Place for My Head"	Linkin Park; Wakefield; Dave Farrell	3:04
10.	"Forgotten"	Linkin Park; Wakefield; Farrell	3:14
11.	"Cure for the Itch"		2:37
12.	"Pushing Me Away"		3:11
Total length:			37:46

=== Bonus edition ===
Bonus tracks
No.	Title	Writer(s)	Length
13.	"My December"	Shinoda	4:20
14.	"High Voltage"		3:45
15.	"Papercut" (Live at BBC1)		3:09

=== Japanese edition ===
Bonus tracks
No.	Title	Writer(s)	Length
13.	"My December"	Shinoda	4:20
14.	"High Voltage"		3:45
15.	"One Step Closer" (video)		2:57

== Hybrid Theory – Live Around the World ==
Hybrid Theory – Live Around the World

Live album by Linkin Park
- Released: May 31, 2012
- Recorded: 2007–2010
- Genres: Nu metal; rap metal; rap rock; alternative metal; alternative rock
- Length: 29:03
- Labels: Warner Bros.; Machine Shop
- Producer: Mike Shinoda

Linkin Park chronology
A Thousand Suns (2010)	Hybrid Theory – Live Around the World (2012)	Meteora – Live Around the World (2012)

Hybrid Theory – Live Around the World is a live album which features live versions of eight songs from the first studio album, Hybrid Theory. They were recorded in various cities around the world from 2007 to 2010. The album was released exclusively on iTunes.

=== Track listing ===
All tracks are written by Linkin Park.

Hybrid Theory – Live Around the World
No.	Title	Length
1.	"Papercut" (live from Paris, 2010)	3:08
2.	"One Step Closer" (live from Frankfurt, 2008)	4:13
3.	"Points of Authority" (live from Sydney, 2007)	4:07
4.	"Crawling" (live from Athens, 2009)	4:41
5.	"In the End" (live from Melbourne, 2010)	3:33
6.	"A Place for My Head" (live from Köln, 2008)	3:57
7.	"Cure for the Itch" (live from Perth, 2007)	1:43
8.	"Pushing Me Away" (live from Dallas, 2007)	3:41

== Personnel ==
Personnel taken from Hybrid Theory liner notes.

Linkin Park

- Chester Bennington – vocals
- Rob Bourdon – drums, backing vocals
- Brad Delson – guitar, bass, backing vocals
- Joe Hahn – turntables, samples, backing vocals
- Mike Shinoda – rap vocals, backing vocals, programming, samples, piano on "My December"
- Dave "Phoenix" Farrell – bass (credited but does not perform)

Additional musicians

- Ian Hornbeck – bass on "Papercut", "A Place for My Head", and "Forgotten"
- Scott Koziol – bass on "One Step Closer"
- The Dust Brothers – additional programming and sampling on "With You"

Production

- Don Gilmore – producer, engineering
- Steve Sisco – engineering
- John Ewing Jr. – additional engineering, Pro Tools
- Mike Shinoda – Pro Tools assistance
- Matt Griffin – engineering assistance
- Andy Wallace – mixing
- Brian Gardner – audio mastering, digital editing
- Jeff Blue – executive producer

Artwork

- Frank Maddocks – graphic design
- James Minchin III – photography
- Mike Shinoda – soldier drawing, line art sketches and drawings
- Joe Hahn – line art sketches and drawings

== Charts ==
=== Weekly charts ===
Weekly chart performance for Hybrid Theory
Chart (2001–2002)	Peak position
Australian Albums (ARIA)	2
Australian Alternative Albums (ARIA)	1
Australian Heavy Rock & Metal Albums (ARIA)	5
Austrian Albums (Ö3 Austria)	2
Belgian Albums (Ultratop Flanders)	3
Belgian Albums (Ultratop Wallonia)	13
Canadian Albums (Billboard)	5
Danish Albums (Hitlisten)	4
Dutch Albums (Album Top 100)	13
European Albums (Music & Media)	4
Finnish Albums (Suomen virallinen lista)	4
French Albums (SNEP)	17
German Albums (Offizielle Top 100)	2
Greek Albums (IFPI)	8
Hungarian Albums (MAHASZ)	4
Irish Albums (IRMA)	6
Italian Albums (FIMI)	2
Japanese Albums (Oricon)	19
New Zealand Albums (RMNZ)	1
Norwegian Albums (VG-lista)	5
Polish Albums (ZPAV)	10
Portuguese Albums (AFP)	5
Scottish Albums (Official Charts)	4
Spanish Albums (AFYVE)	15
Swedish Albums (Sverigetopplistan)	4
Swiss Albums (Schweizer Hitparade)	5
UK Albums (Official Charts)	4
UK Rock & Metal Albums (Official Charts)	1
US Billboard 200	2

2017 weekly chart performance for Hybrid Theory
Chart (2017)	Peak position
Australian Albums (ARIA)	2
Austrian Albums (Ö3 Austria)	6
Canadian Albums (Billboard)	10
Croatian International Albums (HDU)	39
Czech Albums (ČNS IFPI)	11
Danish Albums (Hitlisten)	8
Finnish Albums (Suomen virallinen lista)	8
German Albums (Offizielle Top 100)	11
Irish Albums (IRMA)	4
Italian Albums (FIMI)	9
Latvian Albums (LaIPA)	71
New Zealand Albums (RMNZ)	5
Norwegian Albums (VG-lista)	17
Polish Albums (ZPAV)	24
Scottish Albums (Official Charts)	5
Swiss Albums (Romandie)	9
Swiss Albums (Schweizer Hitparade)	8
UK Albums (Official Charts)	4
UK Rock & Metal Albums (Official Charts)	1
US Billboard 200	8
US Top Alternative Albums (Billboard)	3
US Top Catalog Albums (Billboard)	1
US Top Hard Rock Albums (Billboard)	1
US Top Rock Albums (Billboard)	2
US Vinyl Albums (Billboard)	6

2026 weekly chart performance for Hybrid Theory
Chart (2026)	Peak position
Croatian International Albums (HDU)	3

=== Hybrid Theory (20th anniversary edition) ===
Weekly chart performance for Hybrid Theory (20th anniversary edition)
Chart (2020)	Peak position
Australian Albums (ARIA)	1
Belgian Albums (Ultratop Wallonia)	8
Hungarian Albums (MAHASZ)	3
Portuguese Albums (AFP)	2
US Indie Store Album Sales (Billboard)	10

=== Year-end charts ===
2001 year-end chart performance for Hybrid Theory
Chart (2001)	Position
Australian Albums (ARIA)	15
Austrian Albums (Ö3 Austria)	6
Belgian Albums (Ultratop Flanders)	8
Belgian Albums (Ultratop Wallonia)	92
Belgian Alternative Albums (Ultratop Flanders)	3
Canadian Albums (Nielsen SoundScan)	11
Canadian Metal Albums (Nielsen SoundScan)	4
Danish Albums (Hitlisten)	68
Dutch Albums (Album Top 100)	47
European Albums (Music & Media)	4
Finnish Albums (Suomen virallinen lista)	1
French Albums (SNEP)	111
German Albums (Offizielle Top 100)	4
Irish Albums (IRMA)	12
Italian Albums (FIMI)	33
New Zealand Albums (RMNZ)	1
Swedish Albums (Sverigetopplistan)	3
Swedish Albums & Compilations (Sverigetopplistan)	4
Swiss Albums (Schweizer Hitparade)	29
UK Albums (OCC)	13
US Billboard 200	6
Worldwide Albums (IFPI)	1

2002 year-end chart performance for Hybrid Theory
Chart (2002)	Position
Australian Albums (ARIA)	19
Austrian Albums (Ö3 Austria)	23
Belgian Albums (Ultratop Flanders)	39
Belgian Albums (Ultratop Wallonia)	52
Belgian Alternative Albums (Ultratop Flanders)	20
Canadian Albums (Nielsen SoundScan)	27
Canadian Alternative Albums (Nielsen SoundScan)	6
Danish Albums (Hitlisten)	43
Dutch Albums (Album Top 100)	53
European Albums (Music & Media)	20
French Albums (SNEP)	68
German Albums (Offizielle Top 100)	45
New Zealand Albums (RMNZ)	11
Swedish Albums (Sverigetopplistan)	58
Swedish Albums & Compilations (Sverigetopplistan)	80
Swiss Albums (Schweizer Hitparade)	30
UK Albums (OCC)	85
US Billboard 200	5
Worldwide Albums (IFPI)	28

2003 year-end chart performance for Hybrid Theory
Chart (2003)	Position
Australian Heavy Rock & Metal Albums (ARIA)	16
Belgian Albums (Ultratop Flanders)	89
Belgian Albums (Ultratop Wallonia)	100
US Catalog Albums (Billboard)	5

2004 year-end chart performance for Hybrid Theory
Chart (2004)	Position
Belgian Midprice Albums (Ultratop Wallonia)	37
US Catalog Albums (Billboard)	6

2007 year-end chart performance for Hybrid Theory
Chart (2007)	Position
Belgian Midprice Albums (Ultratop Wallonia)	50
UK Albums (OCC)	228
US Catalog Albums (Billboard)	32

2008 year-end chart performance for Hybrid Theory
Chart (2008)	Position
US Catalog Albums (Billboard)	40

2014 year-end chart performance for Hybrid Theory
Chart (2014)	Position
US Billboard 200	158
US Catalog Albums (Billboard)	12

2017 year-end chart performance for Hybrid Theory
Chart (2017)	Position
Australian Albums (ARIA)	78
Italian Albums (FIMI)	87
UK Albums (OCC)	87
US Alternative Albums (Billboard)	16
US Billboard 200	178
US Catalog Albums (Billboard)	37
US Hard Rock Albums (Billboard)	3
US Top Rock Albums (Billboard)	20

2018 year-end chart performance for Hybrid Theory
Chart (2018)	Position
US Alternative Albums (Billboard)	10
US Billboard 200	171
US Hard Rock Albums (Billboard)	7
US Top Rock Albums (Billboard)	21

2019 year-end chart performance for Hybrid Theory
Chart (2019)	Position
Belgian Albums (Ultratop Flanders)	87
US Alternative Albums (Billboard)	14
US Hard Rock Albums (Billboard)	10
US Top Rock Albums (Billboard)	41

2020 year-end chart performance for Hybrid Theory
Chart (2020)	Position
Belgian Albums (Ultratop Flanders)	100
Belgian Albums (Ultratop Wallonia)	145
German Albums (Offizielle Top 100)	100
Hungarian Albums (MAHASZ)	68
US Alternative Albums (Billboard)	13
US Hard Rock Albums (Billboard)	5
US Top Rock Albums (Billboard)	31

2021 year-end chart performance for Hybrid Theory
Chart (2021)	Position
Belgian Albums (Ultratop Flanders)	125
Belgian Albums (Ultratop Wallonia)	182
Portuguese Albums (AFP)	44
US Billboard 200	196
US Top Rock Albums (Billboard)	25

2022 year-end chart performance for Hybrid Theory
Chart (2022)	Position
Belgian Albums (Ultratop Flanders)	102
Belgian Albums (Ultratop Wallonia)	156
Portuguese Albums (AFP)	16

2023 year-end chart performance for Hybrid Theory
Chart (2023)	Position
Belgian Albums (Ultratop Flanders)	70
Belgian Albums (Ultratop Wallonia)	133
German Albums (Offizielle Top 100)	95
Hungarian Albums (MAHASZ)	94
US Billboard 200	183

2024 year-end chart performance for Hybrid Theory
Chart (2024)	Position
Australian Albums (ARIA)	92
Austrian Albums (Ö3 Austria)	29
Belgian Albums (Ultratop Flanders)	44
Belgian Albums (Ultratop Wallonia)	85
Croatian International Albums (HDU)	25
Dutch Albums (Album Top 100)	62
German Albums (Offizielle Top 100)	23
Hungarian Albums (MAHASZ)	49
Polish Albums (ZPAV)	69

2025 year-end chart performance for Hybrid Theory
Chart (2025)	Position
Austrian Albums (Ö3 Austria)	17
Belgian Albums (Ultratop Flanders)	29
Belgian Albums (Ultratop Wallonia)	90
Dutch Albums (Album Top 100)	54
German Albums (Offizielle Top 100)	14
Hungarian Albums (MAHASZ)	63
Polish Albums (ZPAV)	77
Swiss Albums (Schweizer Hitparade)	80
UK Albums (OCC)	94
US Billboard 200	138

=== Decade-end charts ===
2000s decade-end chart performance for Hybrid Theory
Chart (2000–2009)	Position
Australian Albums (ARIA)	95
UK Albums (OCC)	78
US Billboard 200	11

2010s decade-end chart performance for Hybrid Theory
Chart (2010–2019)	Position
UK Vinyl Albums (OCC)	100

== Certifications and sales ==
Certifications for Hybrid Theory
Region	Certification	Certified units/sales
Argentina (CAPIF)	Platinum	60,000^{^}
Australia (ARIA)	5× Platinum	350,000^{^}
Austria (IFPI Austria)	Platinum	50,000^{*}
Belgium (BRMA)	2× Platinum	100,000^{*}
Brazil (Pro-Música Brasil)	Platinum	250,000^{*}
Canada (Music Canada)	7× Platinum	700,000^{‡}
Croatia (HDU)	Silver	
Denmark (IFPI Danmark)	5× Platinum	100,000^{‡}
Finland (Musiikkituottajat)	Platinum	62,629
France (SNEP)	Platinum	200,000^{*}
Germany (BVMI)	4× Platinum	1,200,000^{‡}
Hungary (MAHASZ)	Platinum	
Iceland	—	6,086
Italy (FIMI) sales since 2009	3× Platinum	150,000^{‡}
Japan (RIAJ)	Platinum	200,000^{^}
Malaysia	—	300,000
Mexico (AMPROFON)	Platinum	150,000^{^}
Netherlands (NVPI)	Platinum	80,000^{^}
New Zealand (RMNZ)	7× Platinum	105,000^{‡}
Norway	—	52,000
Poland (ZPAV)	Platinum	70,000^{*}
Portugal	—	70,000
Portugal (AFP) sales since 2024	Gold	3,500^{‡}
Singapore (RIAS)	Platinum	10,000^{*}
Spain (Promusicae)	Platinum	100,000^{^}
Sweden (GLF)	Platinum	80,000^{^}
Switzerland (IFPI Switzerland)	Platinum	50,000^{^}
United Kingdom (BPI)	7× Platinum	2,100,000^{‡}
United States (RIAA)	12× Platinum	12,000,000^{‡}
Summaries
Europe (IFPI)	4× Platinum	4,000,000^{*}
^{*} Sales figures based on certification alone.^{^} Shipments figures based on certification alone.^{‡} Sales+streaming figures based on certification alone.

== See also ==
- List of best-selling albums in the United States
- List of best-selling albums of the 2000s (decade) in the United Kingdom
