= Runaway (Linkin Park song) =

2000 song by Linkin Park

Song by Linkin Park

from the album Hybrid Theory
- Released: October 24, 2000
- Genre: Nu metal
- Length: 3:04
- Label: Warner Bros.
- Songwriters: Linkin Park; Mark Wakefield
- Producer: Don Gilmore

"Runaway" is a song by Linkin Park. It is the sixth track from their debut album, Hybrid Theory. The song was also remixed for their first remix album Reanimation, titled "Rnw@y". The song was written by the band and Mark Wakefield. A 1998 demo of the song, titled as "Stick and Move" (which was originally titled as "Stick N Move" that appeared on Xero's 4-track sampler tape Xero in 1996), was released on the band's ninth Linkin Park Underground extended play LP Underground 9.0. It is one of three songs on Hybrid Theory to have been written by the band's original lead vocalist, Mark Wakefield.

== Critical reception ==
David Fricke of Rolling Stone noted the "tumbling funk" of Bourdon in the song, as well as the way that Shinoda and Bennington "shoot and share rhymes ... their bodies rocking with spasms of conviction." Writing of Linkin Park's remixing of the track for their album Reanimation, David Browne of Entertainment Weekly called "Rnw@y" "more sonically expansive" than the original version had been. He wrote that "Rnw@y" (along with a few others on the album) made Linkin Park sound like "experimental DJs."

== Charts ==
Chart (2000–2017)	Peak position
UK Rock & Metal (OCC)	10
US Alternative Airplay (Billboard)	40
US Mainstream Rock (Billboard)	37

== Certifications ==
Region	Certification	Certified units/sales
New Zealand (RMNZ)	Gold	15,000^{‡}
United Kingdom (BPI)	Silver	200,000^{‡}
^{‡} Sales+streaming figures based on certification alone.
