= Unshatter Film Soundtrack (Live in São Paulo) =

Soundtrack album by Linkin Park
- Released: September 25, 2026
- Recorded: November 15, 2024
- Venue: Allianz Parque (São Paulo)
- Genre: Nu metal
- Length: 65:27
- Label: Warner

Linkin Park chronology
From Zero (2024)	Unshatter Film Soundtrack (Live in São Paulo) (2026)

Singles from Unshatter
- 1. "Somewhere I Belong" Released: August 4, 2026; 2. "What I've Done" Released: August 21, 2026; 3. "Faint" Released: September 11, 2026; 4. "Heavy Is the Crown" Released: September 18, 2026; 5. "Waiting for the End" Released: September 25, 2026

Unshatter Film Soundtrack (Live in São Paulo) is the first soundtrack album by American rock band Linkin Park. It was released on September 25, 2026, through Warner Records.

Recorded during the band's São Paulo show on their From Zero World Tour in 2024, this is the first live release since the addition of lead singer Emily Armstrong, drummer Colin Brittain, and touring guitarist Alex Feder. It coincides with the release of their documentary film Linkin Park: Unshatter.

== Background ==
On September 5, 2024, Linkin Park played their first live show since October 2017. The lineup included new lead vocalist Emily Armstrong, new drummer Colin Brittain, and touring guitarist Alex Feder, filling in for Brad Delson. The performance was live streamed, and shortly after, they announced their eighth studio album, From Zero, due to be released on November 15, 2024.

On the same day as From Zero's release, Linkin Park performed live in São Paulo, Brazil, at the Nubank Parque stadium, known at the time as Allianz Parque.

On August 4, 2026, the band announced the documentary film Linkin Park: Unshatter, which released on September 30, 2026, with its accompanying soundtrack releasing 5 days prior. Tickets to the movie went on sale on August 13, 2026.

== Track listing ==
All tracks are written by Linkin Park, except "The Emptiness Machine", "Casualty" and "Two Faced" which were co-written by Jon Green and Matias Mora, and "Heavy is the Crown" which was co-written by Mike Elizondo.

No.	Title	Length
1.	"Inception / Intro"	2:40
2.	"Somewhere I Belong"	3:26
3.	"The Emptiness Machine"	3:15
4.	"Creation / Interlude"	1:43
5.	"The Catalyst"	5:00
6.	"Waiting for the End"	4:09
7.	"Casualty"	2:28
8.	"Two Faced"	3:44
9.	"Break Collapse / Interlude"	0:35
10.	"Lost"	2:10
11.	"What I've Done"	3:31
12.	"Leave Out All the Rest"	4:50
13.	"Over Each Other"	3:00
14.	"Numb"	3:23
15.	"In the End"	3:42
16.	"Faint"	4:32
17.	"Resolution / Intro"	1:47
18.	"Papercut"	3:17
19.	"Heavy Is the Crown"	2:48
20.	"Bleed It Out"	5:28
Total length:		65:27

== Personnel ==
Linkin Park

- Emily Armstrong – vocals, guitar on "Over Each Other"
- Colin Brittain – drums
- Dave Farrell – bass, backing vocals, guitar on "Leave Out All the Rest"
- Joe Hahn – turntables, programming, sampling, backing vocals
- Mike Shinoda – vocals, guitar, keyboards

Other musicians

- Alex Feder – guitar, backing vocals

== Charts ==
Chart performance for Unshatter
Chart (2026)	Peak position
Australian Albums (ARIA)	37
Austrian Albums (Ö3 Austria)	4
Belgian Albums (Ultratop Flanders)	9
Belgian Albums (Ultratop Wallonia)	6
Croatian International Albums (HDU)	7
Dutch Albums (Album Top 100)	29
French Albums (SNEP)	12
French Rock & Metal Albums (SNEP)	1
German Albums (Offizielle Top 100)	5
German Rock & Metal Albums (Offizielle Top 100)	2
Greek Albums (IFPI)	84
Hungarian Albums (MAHASZ)	3
Italian Albums (FIMI)	67
Japanese Digital Albums (Oricon)	19
Japanese Download Albums (Billboard Japan)	16
New Zealand Albums (Recorded Music NZ)	29
Polish Albums (ZPAV)	72
Portuguese Albums (AFP)	30
Scottish Albums (Official Charts)	14
Spanish Albums (Promusicae)	40
Swiss Albums (Schweizer Hitparade)	7
UK Albums (Official Charts)	65
UK Rock & Metal Albums (Official Charts)	3
UK Soundtrack Albums (Official Charts)	1
US Soundtrack Albums (Billboard)	8
US Top Album Sales (Billboard)	23
