= List of awards and nominations received by Linkin Park =

Linkin Park awards and nominations
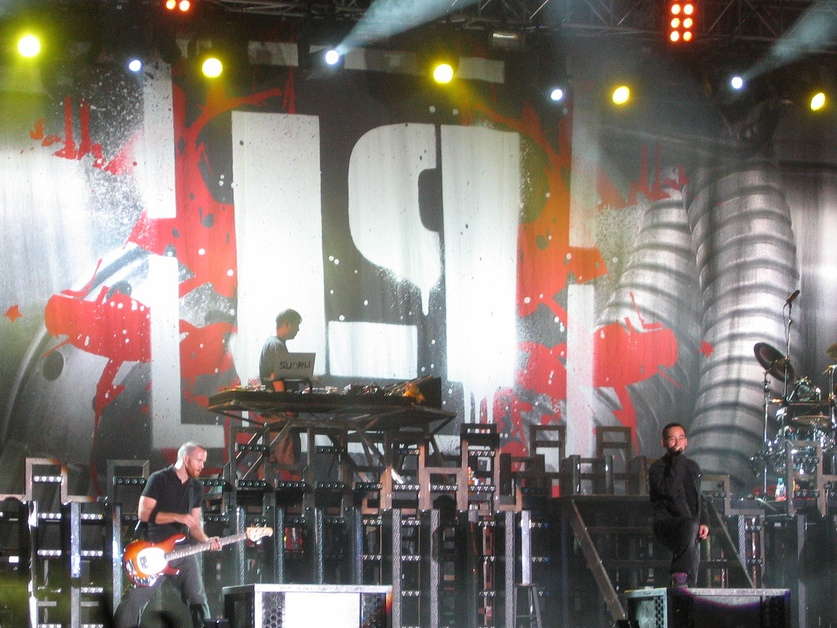
- Linkin Park live in Prague in 2007
Awards and nominations
Award	Wins	Nominations
American Music Awards	7	14
Billboard	4	22
Brit	0	2
Echo	4	10
Grammy	2	8
iHeartRadio Music Awards	4	12
MTV Asia	6	8
MTV Europe	10	22
MTV VMA	4	22
MTV Brazil	3	4
MTV Japan	2	12
Much	2	2
Nickelodeon Kids' Choice	0	4
NRJ	0	1
People's Choice	0	4
Radio Music	2	3
Teen Choice	0	13
TMF Belgium	0	2
World Music	3	11
Kerrang! Awards	3	8
MTV Game Awards	1	1
Scream Awards	1	1
Los Premios MTV Latinoamérica	0	4
International Dance Music Awards	0	3
mtvU Woodie Awards	0	2
Swedish Hit Music Awards	1	1
Rockbjörnen Award	2	2
Spike Guys' Choice Awards	1	1
Emma Awards	1	1
Spike Video Game Awards	0	1
Mnet Asian Music Awards	1	2
MTV Fan Music Awards	0	2
Planeta Awards	2	6
Xbox Entertainment Awards	0	1
IFPI Hong Kong Top Sales Music Awards	3	3
O Music Awards	1	1
Loudwire Music Awards	3	8
Global Leadership Award	1	1
Webby Awards	2	2

Totals (Note: Certain award groups do not simply award one winner. They acknowledge several different recipients, have runners-up, and have third place. Since this is a specific recognition and is different from losing an award, runner-up mentions are considered wins in this award tally. For simplification and to avoid errors, each award in this list has been presumed to have had a prior nomination.)
- Wins: 74
- Nominations: 219

Linkin Park is an American rock band from Agoura Hills, California. The band's current lineup consists of vocalist/rhythm guitarist/keyboardist Mike Shinoda, lead guitarist Brad Delson, DJ/turntablist Joe Hahn, bassist Dave Farrell, vocalist Emily Armstrong, and drummer Colin Brittain. Former members include drummer Rob Bourdon and vocalist Chester Bennington.

Linkin Park has released eight studio albums: Hybrid Theory (2000), Meteora (2003), Minutes to Midnight (2007), A Thousand Suns (2010), Living Things (2012), The Hunting Party (2014), One More Light (2017) and From Zero (2024).

Linkin Park is among both the best-selling bands of the 21st century and the world's best-selling music artists, having sold over 100 million records worldwide. The band has won two Grammy Awards, six American Music Awards, four Billboard Music Awards, four MTV Video Music Awards, 10 MTV Europe Music Awards, and three World Music Awards.

== American Music Awards ==
The American Music Award are awarded for outstanding achievements in the record industry. Linkin Park has received seven awards from twelve nominations. They currently held the record for most wins and nominations in its Favorite Alternative Artist category.

Year	Nominee / work	Award	Result
2003 (January)	Linkin Park	Favorite Alternative Artist	Nominated
2003 (January)	Linkin Park	Favorite Pop/Rock Band/Duo/Group	Nominated
2003 (November)	Linkin Park	Favorite Alternative Artist	Won
2004	Linkin Park	Favorite Alternative Artist	Won
2007	Linkin Park	Favorite Alternative Artist	Won
2007	Linkin Park	Favorite Pop/Rock Band/Duo/Group	Nominated
2007	Minutes To Midnight	Favorite Pop/Rock Album	Nominated
2008	Linkin Park	Favorite Alternative Artist	Won
2012	Linkin Park	Favorite Alternative Artist	Won
2017	Linkin Park	Favorite Alternative Artist	Won
2025	Linkin Park	Favorite Rock Artist	Nominated
2025	"The Emptiness Machine"	Favorite Rock Song	Won
2026	Linkin Park	Best Rock/Alternative Artist	Nominated
2026	"Up From the Bottom"	Best Rock/Alternative Song	Nominated

== Berlin Music Video Awards ==
The Berlin Music Video Awards is an international festival that promotes the art of music videos.

Year	Nominee/ work	Award	Result	Ref.
2025	"Heavy Is The Crown - League of Legends Worlds 2024 Anthem"	Best Animation	Nominated	

== Billboard Music Awards ==
The Billboard Music Awards, sponsored by Billboard magazine is one of several annual United States music awards shows. Linkin Park was nominated for six awards in the 2011 ceremony.

Year	Nominee / work	Award	Result
2001	Linkin Park	Modern Rock Artist Of The Year	Won
2001	Linkin Park	Rock Artist of the Year	Nominated
2001	Linkin Park	New Artist Of The Year	Nominated
2002	Linkin Park	Duo Or Group Artist Of The Year	Nominated
2002	"In the End"	Modern Rock Track Of The Year	Nominated
2003	Linkin Park	Duo Or Group Artist Of The Year	Nominated
2003	Linkin Park	Modern Rock Artist Of The Year	Nominated
2004	Linkin Park	Duo Or Group Artist Of The Year	Nominated
2011	Linkin Park	Top Duo/Group	Nominated
2011	Linkin Park	Top Rock Artist	Nominated
2011	Linkin Park	Top Alternative Artist	Nominated
2011	A Thousand Suns	Top Rock Album	Nominated
2011	A Thousand Suns	Top Alternative Album	Nominated
2011	"Waiting for the End"	Top Alternative Song	Nominated
2018	Linkin Park	Top Rock Artist	Nominated
2018	One More Light	Top Rock Album	Nominated
2018	"Heavy" (featuring Kiiara)	Top Rock Song	Nominated
2024	Linkin Park	Top Duo/Group	Nominated
2024	Linkin Park	Top Rock Artist	Nominated
2024	Linkin Park	Top Rock Duo/Group	Won
2024	Linkin Park	Top Hard Rock Artist	Won
2024	"The Emptiness Machine"	Top Hard Rock Song	Nominated

== BRIT Awards ==
The BRIT Awards is an annual music awards show in the United Kingdom, which is presented by the British Phonographic Industry.

Year	Nominee / work	Award	Result	Ref.
2002	Linkin Park	Best International Newcomer	Nominated	
2025	Linkin Park	Best International Group	Nominated	

== Echo Music Prize ==
The Echo Music Prize was a German music award event held annually. Each year's winner was determined by the previous year's sales. Linkin Park received four awards from nine nominations.

Year	Nominee / work	Award	Result
2002	Linkin Park	International Newcomer Of The Year	Nominated
2002	Linkin Park	International Artist/Group Of The Year	Won
2003	Linkin Park	International Artist/Group Of The Year	Nominated
2004	Linkin Park	International Artist/Group Of The Year	Nominated
2004	Linkin Park	International Group Of The Year	Nominated
2008	Minutes to Midnight	International/National Album Of The Year	Nominated
2008	Linkin Park	International Group Of The Year	Won
2011	Linkin Park (for A Thousand Suns)	Best International Rock/Alternative Group	Won
2013	Linkin Park	Best International Rock/Alternative Group	Won
2015	Linkin Park	Best International Rock/Alternative Group	Nominated

== Emma Awards ==
The Emma Awards are presented at the Emma Gaala, a Finnish music event.

Year	Nominee / work	Award	Result
2001	Linkin Park	Best Foreigner Artist of The Year	Won

== ESPN Action Sports & Music Awards ==
The ESPN Action Sports and Music Award was a ceremony honouring both extreme athletes and the music that stimulates them. Linkin Park received an award in 2001.

Year	Nominee / work	Award	Result
2001	Linkin Park	Music Artist of the Year (Motocross riding)	Won

== Grammy Awards ==
The Grammy Awards are awarded annually by the National Academy of Recording Arts and Sciences. Linkin Park has received two awards from eight nominations.

Year	Nominee / work	Award	Result
2002	"Crawling"	Best Hard Rock Performance	Won
2002	Hybrid Theory	Best Rock Album	Nominated
2002	Linkin Park	Best New Artist	Nominated
2004	"Session"	Best Rock Instrumental Performance	Nominated
2006	"Numb/Encore" (with Jay-Z)	Best Rap/Sung Collaboration	Won
2010	"What I've Done" (Road To Revolution: Live At Milton Keynes)	Best Hard Rock Performance	Nominated
2026	"The Emptiness Machine"	Best Rock Performance	Nominated
2026	From Zero	Best Rock Album	Nominated

== IFPI Hong Kong Top Sales Music Awards ==
Year	Nominee / work	Award	Result
2003	Meteora	Top 10 Best Selling Foreign Albums	Won
2005	Collision Course (with Jay-Z)	Top 10 Best Selling Foreign Albums	Won
2007	Minutes to Midnight	Top 10 Best Selling Foreign Albums	Won

== iHeartRadio ==
=== iHeartRadio Music Awards ===
The iHeartRadio Music Awards is an international music awards show founded by iHeartRadio in 2014. Linkin Park has received three awards from twelve nominations.

Year	Nominee / work	Award	Result
2018	One More Light	Rock Album of the Year	Won
2024	"Lost"	Alternative Song of the Year	Nominated
2024	"Lost"	Rock Song of the Year	Won
2025	"The Emptiness Machine"	Alternative Song of the Year	Nominated
2025	"The Emptiness Machine"	Rock Song of the Year	Nominated
2025	Linkin Park	Alternative Artist of the Year	Nominated
2025	Linkin Park	Rock Artist of the Year	Nominated
2025	From Zero	Rock Album of the Year	Won
2026	Linkin Park	Duo/Group of the Year	Nominated
2026	Linkin Park	Alternative Artist of the Year	Nominated
2026	Linkin Park	Rock Artist of the Year	Nominated
2026	"Heavy Is the Crown"	Rock Song of the Year	Won

=== iHeartRadio Much Music Video Awards ===
The iHeartRadio Much Music Video Awards was an award show which was broadcast live on Much Music. Linkin Park received two awards from two nominations.

Year	Nominee / work	Award	Result
2004	"Numb"	People's Choice: Favourite International Group	Won
2008	"Bleed It Out"	Best International Group Video	Won

== International Dance Music Awards ==
The International Dance Music Awards was an annual awards ceremony held by the Winter Music Conference to recognise the achievement of dance artists, producers, DJs, radio stations and record labels. Linkin Park received three nominations.

Year	Nominee / work	Award	Result
2005	"Numb/Encore" (with Jay-Z)	Best Alternative/Rock Dance Track	Nominated
2011	"The Catalyst" (remix)	Best Alternative/Rock Dance Track	Nominated
2014	"A Light That Never Comes"	Best Alternative/Rock Dance Track	Nominated

== Kerrang! Awards ==
The Kerrang! Awards was an annual awards ceremony held by Kerrang!, a British rock magazine. Linkin Park received three awards from eight nominations.

Year	Nominee / work	Award	Result
2001	Linkin Park	Best International Newcomer	Won
2001	Linkin Park	Best Band In the World	Nominated
2001	"Crawling"	Best Single	Nominated
2003	Linkin Park	Best International Act	Won
2003	"Faint"	Best Single	Nominated
2004	"Breaking the Habit"	Best Single	Nominated
2007	"What I've Done"	Best Video	Nominated
2009	Linkin Park	Classic Songwriter Award	Won

== Loudwire Music Awards ==
The Loudwire Music Awards are awarded for outstanding achievements in the rock music category. Linkin Park has received two awards from three nominations.

Year	Nominee / work	Award	Result
2015	The Hunting Party	Rock Album of the Year	Nominated
2015	"Rebellion"	Rock Song of the Year	Nominated
2015	Linkin Park	Rock Band of the Year	Won
2015	Linkin Park	Live Act of the Year	Won
2015	Linkin Park	Most Devoted Fans	Nominated
2015	Chester Bennington	Best Vocalist	Nominated
2015	Brad Delson	Best Guitarist	Nominated
2017	Chester Bennington	Best Vocalist	Won

== MAMA Awards ==
The MAMA Awards (formerly the Mnet Asian Music Awards) is an award show held annually that credits South Korean artists, as well as foreign artists who have had an impact in the South Korean Music industry.

Year	Nominee / work	Award	Result
2002	"Points of Authority"	Best International Artist	Nominated
2003	"Somewhere I Belong"	Best International Artist	Won

== MTV Awards ==
=== MTV Asia Awards ===
The MTV Asia Awards was an annual Asian awards ceremony established in 2002 by the MTV television network. Linkin Park received six awards from eight nominations.

Year	Nominee / work	Award	Result
2002	Linkin Park	Favorite Breakthrough Artist	Won
2002	Linkin Park	Favorite Rock Act	Nominated
2003	"Pts.OF.Athrty"	Favorite Video	Won
2003	Linkin Park	Favorite Rock Act	Won
2004	"Somewhere I Belong"	Favorite Video	Won
2004	Linkin Park	Favorite Rock Act	Won
2008	Linkin Park	Favorite International Artist of Asia	Won
2008	Linkin Park	Bring Da House Down	Nominated

=== MTV Europe Music Awards ===
The MTV Europe Music Awards were established in 1994 by MTV Europe to celebrate the most popular music videos in Europe. Linkin Park has received 10 awards from twenty two nominations.

Year	Nominee / work	Award	Result
2001	Linkin Park	Best Rock	Nominated
2002	Linkin Park	Best Hard Rock	Won
2002	Linkin Park	Best Group	Won
2002	www.linkinpark.com	Web Award	Nominated
2003	Linkin Park	Best Rock	Nominated
2004	Linkin Park	Best Rock	Won
2007	Linkin Park	Best Group	Won
2007	Linkin Park	Rock Out	Nominated
2007	Minutes To Midnight	Album of the Year	Nominated
2008	Linkin Park	Rock Out	Nominated
2008	Linkin Park	Headliner	Nominated
2009	Linkin Park	Best Rock	Nominated
2009	Linkin Park	Best World Stage Performance	Won
2010	Linkin Park	Best Live Act	Won
2010	Linkin Park	Best Rock	Nominated
2011	Linkin Park	Best Rock	Won
2011	Linkin Park	Best World Stage Performance	Nominated
2012	Linkin Park	Best Rock	Won
2012	Linkin Park	Best North American Act	Nominated
2013	Linkin Park	Best World Stage Performance	Won
2014	Linkin Park	Best World Stage Performance	Nominated
2014	Linkin Park	Best Rock	Won

=== MTV Fan Music Awards ===
The MTV Fan Music Awards is an annual awards ceremony established in 2011 by the MTV television network. Linkin Park has received two nominations in 2011.

Year	Nominee / work	Award	Result
2011	"The Catalyst"	Best Group Video	Nominated
2011	Linkin Park	Best Group	Nominated

=== MTV Game Awards ===
The MTV Game Awards is an award given by the music channel MTV for video games. The nominations are selected by a jury consisting of established journalists and professional video game players.

Year	Nominee / work	Award	Result
2011	"Blackout"	Best Song In A Video Game (FIFA 11)	Won

=== MTV Video Music Awards ===
The MTV Video Music Awards were established in 1984 by MTV to celebrate the top music videos of the year. Linkin Park has received four awards from twenty-two nominations.

Year	Nominee / work	Award	Result
2001	"Crawling"	Best Direction in a Video	Nominated
2001	"Crawling"	Best Rock Video	Nominated
2002	"In the End"	Best Rock Video	Won
2002	"In the End"	Video of the Year	Nominated
2002	"In the End"	Best Group Video	Nominated
2003	"Somewhere I Belong"	Best Rock Video	Won
2004	"Breaking the Habit"	Viewer's Choice Award	Won
2004	"Breaking the Habit"	Best Rock Video	Nominated
2007	"What I've Done"	Best Editing in a Video	Nominated
2007	"What I've Done"	Best Director	Nominated
2007	Linkin Park	Best Group	Nominated
2008	"Shadow of the Day"	Best Rock Video	Won
2008	"Shadow of the Day"	Best Direction	Nominated
2008	"Bleed It Out"	Best Special Effects	Nominated
2011	"Waiting for the End"	Best Special Effects	Nominated
2012	"Burn It Down"	Best Rock Video	Nominated
2012	"Burn It Down"	Best Visual Effects	Nominated
2014	"Until It's Gone"	Best Rock Video	Nominated
2018	"One More Light"	Best Rock	Nominated
2023	"Lost"	Best Rock	Nominated
2024	"Friendly Fire"	Best Alternative	Nominated
2025	"The Emptiness Machine"	Best Rock	Nominated

=== MTV Video Music Awards Japan ===
The MTV Video Music Awards Japan are the Japanese version of the MTV Video Music Awards that started in 2002 after branching out from the MTV Asia Awards.

Year	Nominee / work	Award	Result
2002	Linkin Park	Best New Artist	Nominated
2004	"Somewhere I Belong"	Best Rock Video	Nominated
2004	Meteora	Album of the Year	Nominated
2005	"Breaking the Habit"	Best Group Video	Won
2005	"Breaking the Habit"	Best Rock Video	Nominated
2005	"Numb/Encore" (with Jay-Z)	Best Collaboration	Won
2008	"What I've Done"	Best Rock Video	Nominated
2008	"What I've Done"	Best Video from a Film	Nominated
2011	A Thousand Suns	Album of the Year	Nominated
2011	"The Catalyst"	Best Group Video	Nominated
2011	"The Catalyst"	Best Rock Video	Nominated
2013	Living Things	Album of the Year	Nominated

=== MTV Video Music Brazil ===
The MTV Video Music Brazil was MTV Brazil's annual award ceremony, established in 1995. Linkin Park received three awards from four nominations, thus being the biggest non-Brazilian winner of the award.

Year	Nominee / work	Award	Result
2002	"In the End"	Best International Video	Won
2003	"Somewhere I Belong"	Best International Video	Won
2004	"Numb"	Best International Video	Won
2005	"Jigga What"/"Faint" (with Jay-Z)	Best International Video	Nominated

=== MTV Woodies ===
The MTV Woodies was an annual awards show sponsored by MTVU, a division of MTV. Linkin Park received two nominations.

Year	Nominee / work	Award	Result
2007	Linkin Park	The Good Woodie	Nominated
2007	"What I've Done"	Viral Woodie	Nominated

=== O Music Awards ===
The O Music Awards was an awards show established by MTV to honour music, technology and intersection between the two. Linkin Park received one award in 2013.

Year	Nominee / work	Award	Result
2013	"Lost in the Echo"	Best Interactive Video	Won

=== Premios MTV Latinoamérica ===
Premios MTV Latinoamérica was the Latin American version of the MTV Video Music Awards, established in 2002 to celebrate the top music videos of the year in Latin America and the world.

Year	Nominee / work	Award	Result
2002	Linkin Park	Best New Artist — International	Nominated
2002	Linkin Park	Best Rock Artist — International	Nominated
2003	Linkin Park	Best Rock Artist — International	Nominated
2009	Linkin Park	Best Rock Artist — International	Nominated

== Nickelodeon Kids' Choice Awards ==
The Nickelodeon Kids' Choice Awards is an annual awards show established in 1988 by Nickelodeon. Linkin Park has received three nominations.

Year	Nominee / work	Award	Result
2008	Linkin Park	Favorite Music Group	Nominated
2009	Linkin Park	Favorite Music Group	Nominated
2010	Linkin Park	Favorite Music Group	Nominated
2025	Linkin Park	Favorite Music Group	Nominated

== NME Awards ==
The NME Awards is an annual music awards show in the United Kingdom, founded by the music magazine, NME.

Year	Nominee / work	Award	Result
2018	Linkin Park and Friends: Celebrate Life in Honor of Chester Bennington	Music Moment of the Year	Nominated

== NRJ Music Awards ==
The NRJ Music Awards is an annual awards ceremony held in Cannes, France, for popular musicians by various categories. Linkin Park has received one nomination.

Year	Nominee / work	Award	Result
2008	Linkin Park	International Group\Duo of the Year	Nominated

== People's Choice Awards ==
The People's Choice Awards is an annual award show on pop culture, including movies, TV, and music. Linkin Park has received four nominations.

Year	Nominee / work	Award	Result
2008	"What I've Done"	Favorite Song from a Soundtrack: Transformers: The Album	Nominated
2011	Linkin Park	Favorite Rock Band	Nominated
2012	Linkin Park	Favorite Band	Nominated
2013	Linkin Park	Favorite Band	Nominated

== Planeta Awards ==
The Planeta Awards is an annual Peruvian awards ceremony established by Radio Planeta. Linkin Park has received two awards from six nominations.

Year	Nominee / work	Award	Result
2007	Linkin Park	Group of the Year	Won
2007	Linkin Park	Rock Artist of the Year	Nominated
2007	"What I've Done"	The Megaplaneta of the Year	Nominated
2007	"What I've Done"	Rock Song of the Year	Nominated
2007	"Bleed It Out"	Rock Song of the Year	Nominated
2007	"Bleed It Out"	Best Male Vocal Interpretation (Chester Bennington / Mike Shinoda)	Won

== Radio Music Awards ==
The Radio Music Awards is an annuel award show honoring the best music in radio. Linkin Park has received two awards from three nominations.

Year	Nominee / work	Award	Result
2004	Linkin Park	Artist of the Year: Rock Radio	Won
2004	"Numb"	Song of the Year: Rock Alternative Radio	Won
2005	Linkin Park	Artist of the Year/ Alternative and Active Rock Radio	Nominated

== Rockbjörnen Award ==
Rockbjörnen is a music prize in Sweden, divided into several categories, which is awarded annually by the newspaper Aftonbladet. Linkin Park has received two awards from two nominations.

Year	Nominee / work	Award	Result
2001	Hybrid Theory	The year's foreign album	Won
2001	Linkin Park	The year's foreign group	Won

== Spike Awards ==
=== Guys Choice ===
Guys Choice was an awards show produced by the Viacom cable channel Spike. It was similar to Viacom's MTV Movie & TV Awards. The winners were chosen based on voting by fans and viewers of the channel. Linkin Park received one award in 2008.

Year	Nominee / work	Award	Result
2008	Linkin Park	Ballsiest Band	Won

=== Scream Awards ===
The Scream Awards were an annual awards show run by Spike, dedicated primarily to the horror, sci-fi and fantasy genres of feature films.

Year	Nominee / work	Award	Result
2009	"New Divide" (Transformers: Revenge of the Fallen)	Scream Song Of The Year	Won

=== Spike Video Game Awards ===
The Spike Video Game Awards were an annual award show hosted by Spike that recognised the best computer and video games of the year. Linkin Park has received one nomination.

Year	Nominee / work	Award	Result
2012	"Castle of Glass"	Best Song in a Game (Medal of Honor: Warfighter)	Nominated

== Swedish Hit Music Awards ==
Year	Nominee / work	Award	Result
2002	Linkin Park	Best Foreign Rock	Won

== Teen Choice Awards ==
The Teen Choice Awards were an annual awards show first aired in 1999 by Fox Broadcasting Company. Linkin Park received 13 nominations.

Year	Nominee / work	Award	Result
2001	"One Step Closer"	Choice Rock Track	Nominated
2002	Hybrid Theory	Choice Album	Nominated
2004	"Somewhere I Belong"	Choice Rock Track	Nominated
2005	"Numb/Encore"	Choice Collaboration	Nominated
2007	Linkin Park	Choice Rock Group	Nominated
2007	"What I've Done"	Choice Rock Track	Nominated
2008	Linkin Park	Choice Rock Group	Won
2008	"Shadow of the Day"	Choice Rock Track	Nominated
2009	Linkin Park	Choice Rock Group	Nominated
2011	Linkin Park	Choice Rock Band	Nominated
2011	"Waiting for the End"	Choice Rock Track	Nominated
2012	Linkin Park	Choice Rock Group	Nominated
2017	Linkin Park	Choice Rock Artist	Nominated
2017	"Heavy" (featuring Kiiara)	Choice Rock Track	Nominated

== TMF Awards ==
The TMF Awards were an annual television awards show broadcast live on The Music Factory TV channel in Belgium, the Netherlands, and the UK. Linkin Park has received two nominations in 2007.

Year	Nominee / work	Award	Result
2007	Linkin Park	Best Rock	Nominated
2007	Minutes To Midnight	Best Album	Nominated

== United Nations Foundation Global Leadership Award ==
On November 8, 2011, the band was awarded the Global Leadership Award by the United Nations Foundation. This was in recognition of Linkin Park's humanitarian philanthropy via the band's Music for Relief non-profit, and fundraising $500,000 USD to the Save the Children charity following the events of the 2011 Tōhoku earthquake and tsunami.

== Webby Awards ==
The Webby Awards recognise achievements relating to online content, including websites, mobile apps, social media, and film and video.

Year	Nominee / work	Award	Result
2025	"Heavy Is the Crown" Music Video (League of Legends)	People's Voice Winner - Advertising, Media & PR, Media & Entertainment	Won
2025	From Zero Live Stream	People's Voice Winner - Social, Events & Live Streams (Video)	Won

== World Music Awards ==
The World Music Awards was an international award show, which honoured recording artists based on worldwide sales figures provided by the International Federation of the Phonographic Industry. Linkin Park received three awards from 11 nominations.

Year	Nominee / work	Award	Result
2002	Linkin Park	World's Best Selling Rock Group	Won
2003	Linkin Park	World's Best Selling Rock Group	Won
2007	Linkin Park	World's Best Selling Rock Group	Won
2014	Linkin Park	World's Best Group	Nominated
2014	Linkin Park	World's Best Live Act	Nominated
2014	Living Things	World's Best Album	Nominated
2014	Recharged	World's Best Album	Nominated
2014	"Burn It Down"	World's Best Song	Nominated
2014	"A Light That Never Comes"	World's Best Song	Nominated
2014	"Burn It Down"	World's Best Video	Nominated
2014	"A Light That Never Comes"	World's Best Video	Nominated

== Xbox Entertainment Awards ==
Year	Nominee / work	Award	Result
2013	Linkin Park	Best Artist	Nominated

== Billboard Decade-End ==
Linkin Park has appeared on several Billboard Decade-End Charts. Linkin Park was ranked number 19 on Billboard's 100 Best Artists of the Decade. This made Linkin Park the fifth best performing group and third best performing rock artist (behind Nickelback and Creed). Linkin Park ended the decade as the third best selling artist (behind Eminem and Britney Spears).

The band topped the decade as the Top Mainstream Rock Tracks Artist and Top Modern Rock Tracks Artist, making them the most successful rock group of the decade having accumulated over thirteen #1 hits and a total of 84 weeks at the top of both charts. Linkin Park achieved eight and four Mainstream Rock and Modern Rock Top Tracks of the decade, respectively (more than any other artist). The band was the fifth best performing artist on the Billboard 200 this decade with three #1 albums (five Top 5 albums), becoming the best charting group and rock artist of the decade on the chart. The band achieved three Top Billboard 200 albums this decade (Collision Course, Meteora, Minutes To Midnight).

Year	Charted Work	Decade-End Chart	Rank
2009	Linkin Park	Billboard Artists of the Decade	(#19)
2009	Linkin Park	Hot 100 Artists	(#56)
2009	Linkin Park	Billboard 200 Album Artists	(#5)
2009	Hybrid Theory	Billboard 200 Albums	(#11)
2009	Meteora	Billboard 200 Albums	(#36)
2009	Minutes To Midnight	Billboard 200 Albums	(#154)
2009	Linkin Park	Radio Songs Artists	(#50)
2009	"In the End"	Radio Songs	(#65)
2009	Linkin Park	Hot Digital Songs Artists	(#36)
2009	"What I've Done"	Hot Digital Songs	(#95)
2009	"In the End"	Pop Songs	(#36)
2009	Linkin Park	Rock Songs Artists	(#1)
2009	"In the End"	Rock Songs	(#2)
2009	"Faint"	Rock Songs	(#13)
2009	"Numb"	Rock Songs	(#22)
2009	"Somewhere I Belong"	Rock Songs	(#33)
2009	"One Step Closer"	Rock Songs	(#43)
2009	"Crawling"	Rock Songs	(#45)
2009	"What I've Done"	Rock Songs	(#77)
2009	"Breaking the Habit"	Rock Songs	(#84)
2009	Linkin Park	Alternative Songs Artists	(#1)
2009	"In the End"	Alternative Songs	(#2)
2009	"Faint"	Alternative Songs	(#8)
2009	"Numb"	Alternative Songs	(#15)
2009	"Somewhere I Belong"	Alternative Songs	(#24)
