= Up From the Bottom =

Single by Linkin Park

from the album From Zero (Deluxe Edition)
- Released: March 27, 2025
- Recorded: December 2024
- Genre: Nu metal
- Length: 3:03
- Label: Warner; Machine Shop
- Songwriters: Emily Armstrong; Colin Brittain; Brad Delson; Dave Farrell; Joe Hahn; Mike Shinoda
- Producer: Mike Shinoda

Linkin Park singles chronology
| "Two Faced" (2024) | "Up From the Bottom" (2025) | "Unshatter" (2025) |

Music video
- "Up From the Bottom" on YouTube

"Up From the Bottom" is a song by American rock band Linkin Park. It was released on March 27, 2025, as the lead single from the deluxe edition of the band's eighth studio album, From Zero.

This song is featured in the soundtrack of Horizon XS radio station in Forza Horizon 6.

== Background ==
After the initial touring leg for their From Zero World Tour in late 2024, the band immediately entered the studio to record new music. "Up From the Bottom" started as an initial demo before properly materialising during recording sessions in December 2024. A then untitled song was teased during a video for the LPTV series that was uploaded to the band's YouTube channel on March 6, 2025. On March 17, the band officially revealed "Up From the Bottom", due for release on March 27. In an interview with Billboard on the lead up to the release at the iHeartRadio Music Awards, the band's turntablist, Joe Hahn, praised the song, jokingly calling it "the best song we've ever made". On March 27, the band released the song as the lead single from the deluxe edition of their eighth studio album, From Zero. The single was made available on Fortnite Festival on the day of its release.

== Composition ==
The song's overall theme is about being trapped in a bad place, either mentally or physically, and trying to escape it. Lines like "Inside it feels like I’ve been barely breathin’" and "Waking up without a name" intensify the feeling of desperation.

"Up From the Bottom" has been described by critics as nu metal.

== Music video ==
The music video was directed by Joe Hahn and premiered on March 27, 2025.

The video features the band performing in a giant room. It then switches to each band member in different scenarios, Hahn in a coma, Colin Brittain locked inside a prison that is being surrounded by guards, Mike Shinoda trying to escape a concrete building through the ceiling, Brad Delson walking around a room, Emily Armstrong putting on a bandana, and Dave Farrell being locked in a box while wearing a straitjacket. During Mike Shinoda's rapping part, he gives away his guitar to Emily before he takes it back for the last chorus. According to Hahn, the scenarios represent the feeling for them, when they heard the song.

== Personnel ==
Linkin Park

- Emily Armstrong – lead vocals
- Colin Brittain – drums
- Brad Delson – lead guitar, piano
- Phoenix – bass guitar
- Joe Hahn – turntables, samples, programming
- Mike Shinoda – rap vocals, rhythm guitar, keyboards, sampler

Additional personnel

- Colin Brittain – co-production
- Brad Delson – co-production
- Mike Shinoda – production, record engineering
- Linkin Park – composition
- Rich Costey – mixing
- Ethan Mates – record engineering
- Emerson Mancini – mastering
- Jeff Citron – mixing assistance

== Charts ==
=== Weekly charts ===
Weekly chart performance for "Up From the Bottom"
| Chart (2025) | Peak position |
|---|---|
| Australia Digital Tracks (ARIA) | 21 |
| Austria (Ö3 Austria Top 40) | 7 |
| Belgium (Ultratop 50 Flanders) | 35 |
| Canada Hot 100 (Billboard) | 65 |
| Canada Mainstream Rock (Billboard Canada) | 1 |
| Canada Modern Rock (Billboard Canada) | 17 |
| Czech Republic Airplay (ČNS IFPI) | 2 |
| Czech Republic Singles Digital (ČNS IFPI) | 3 |
| France (SNEP) | 80 |
| Germany (GfK) | 6 |
| Global 200 (Billboard) | 58 |
| Greece International (IFPI) | 100 |
| Hungary (Single Top 40) | 27 |
| Italy Airplay (FIMI) | 68 |
| Italy Rock Airplay (FIMI) | 4 |
| Japan Hot Overseas (Billboard) | 13 |
| Lithuania Airplay (TopHit) | 40 |
| Luxembourg (Billboard) | 16 |
| Netherlands (Single Top 100) | 82 |
| New Zealand Hot Singles (RMNZ) | 7 |
| Nicaragua Anglo Airplay (Monitor Latino) | 5 |
| Norway (VG-lista) | 78 |
| Poland (Polish Streaming Top 100) | 90 |
| Portugal (AFP) | 53 |
| Slovakia (Singles Digitál Top 100) | 30 |
| South Korea BGM (Circle) | 162 |
| Sweden Heatseeker (Sverigetopplistan) | 2 |
| Switzerland (Schweizer Hitparade) | 13 |
| UK Singles (Official Charts) | 42 |
| UK Rock & Metal (Official Charts) | 2 |
| US Bubbling Under Hot 100 (Billboard) | 5 |
| US Hot Rock & Alternative Songs (Billboard) | 15 |
| US Rock & Alternative Airplay (Billboard) | 1 |

=== Monthly charts ===
Monthly chart performance for "Up From the Bottom"
| Chart (2025) | Peak position |
|---|---|
| Lithuania Airplay (TopHit) | 65 |

=== Year-end charts ===
Year-end chart performance for "Up From the Bottom"
| Chart (2025) | Position |
|---|---|
| Canada Mainstream Rock (Billboard) | 13 |
| Canada Modern Rock (Billboard) | 35 |
| US Hot Rock & Alternative Songs (Billboard) | 79 |
| US Rock & Alternative Airplay (Billboard) | 7 |

== Certifications ==
Certifications for "Up From the Bottom"
| Region | Certification | Certified units/sales |
|---|---|---|
| France (SNEP) | Gold | 100,000^{‡} |
^{‡} Sales+streaming figures based on certification alone.
