= Unshatter =

2025 Linkin Park song

Single by Linkin Park

from the album From Zero (Deluxe Edition)
- Released: April 25, 2025
- Recorded: May 2023 - October 2024
- Studio: The Stockroom, Los Angeles
- Genre: Rap rock
- Length: 3:16
- Label: Warner; Machine Shop
- Songwriters: Emily Armstrong; Colin Brittain; Brad Delson; Dave Farrell; Joe Hahn; Mike Shinoda; Jake Torrey
- Producer: Mike Shinoda

Linkin Park singles chronology
"Up From the Bottom" (2025)	"Unshatter" (2025)

Official visualizer
- "Unshatter" on YouTube

"Unshatter" is a song by American rock band Linkin Park. It was released on April 25, 2025, as the second single from the deluxe edition of the band's eighth studio album, From Zero.

== Background ==
It is one of the first songs written and recorded with Emily Armstrong on lead vocals replacing Chester Bennington, with Mike Shinoda stating, "Unshatter was an early track we made while recording From Zero; Emily's huge vocal in the bridge was one of the moments that gave us an indication of what was possible together." The song was written by all band members and Jake Torrey, who also co-wrote "Overflow" and "Good Things Go."

== Lyrics ==
The song's lyrics speak of broken promises and betrayed trust, discussing the desire to "unshatter" the singer's vision of the future while ultimately accepting that they will "never ever put it back together."

== Personnel ==
Linkin Park

- Emily Armstrong – lead vocals
- Colin Brittain – drums, tambourine
- Brad Delson – lead guitar, piano
- Phoenix – bass guitar
- Joe Hahn – turntables, samples, programming
- Mike Shinoda – rapping, backing vocals, rhythm guitar, keyboards, sampler

Additional personnel

- Colin Brittain – co-production
- Brad Delson – co-production
- Mike Shinoda – production, record engineering
- Linkin Park – composition
- Jake Torrey – composition
- Rich Costey – mixing
- Ethan Mates – record engineering
- Emerson Mancini – mastering
- Scott Skrzynski – mixing assistance

== Charts ==
Chart performance
Chart (2025)	Peak position
Australia Digital Tracks (ARIA)	27
Austria (Ö3 Austria Top 40)	61
Czech Republic (Singles Digitál Top 100)	96
Germany (GfK)	63
New Zealand Hot Singles (RMNZ)	9
Switzerland (Schweizer Hitparade)	88
UK Singles Downloads (OCC)	26
UK Singles Sales (OCC)	27
UK Rock & Metal (Official Charts)	26
US Hot Rock & Alternative Songs (Billboard)	38
