= From Zero World Tour =

2024–2026 concert tour by Linkin Park

- World tour by Linkin Park
- Promotional poster example
- Location: Asia; Europe; North America; Oceania; South America
- Associated album: From Zero
- Start date: September 11, 2024
- End date: June 30, 2026
- No. of shows: 100
- Supporting acts: AFI; Architects; Bad Omens; Jean Dawson; Deny; Ego Kill Talent; Grandson; JPEGMafia; Helmet; Pvris; Polaris; Poppy; Sleep Token; Spiritbox; One Ok Rock; Tenemos Explosivos; PeachPuffs; Phantogram; Clipse; Last Train; Vana
- Producer: Live Nation
- Attendance: 2.2 million (80 shows)
- Box office: $251 million (80 shows)

Linkin Park concert chronology
- Linkin Park and Friends: Celebrate Life in Honor of Chester Bennington (2017); From Zero World Tour (2024–2026)

The From Zero World Tour was a concert tour by the American rock band Linkin Park in support of their eighth studio album From Zero (2024). The tour was announced on September 5, 2024, following the release of the album's lead single, "The Emptiness Machine". The tour commenced on September 11, 2024, in Inglewood, California, and concluded on June 30, 2026, in Zurich, Switzerland.

This tour was the band's first in seven years, and the first without vocalist Chester Bennington, drummer and co-founder Rob Bourdon, and lead guitarist Brad Delson; the lattermost remains a member of the band but has stepped back from touring.

According to Billboard, the tour was attended by 2.2 million people and has grossed $251 million from 80 shows, making it the most attended and highest-grossing tour of the band's career.

== Critical reception ==
Chris Willman of Variety gave the Inglewood show a positive review, noting that "when a woman is very unexpectedly put at the top of the ticket, things very unexpectedly go right." Ali Shutler of The Guardian gave the London show four out of five stars, commenting that "the hybrid metallers have found a new audience and a reinvigorated sense of purpose".

== Set list ==
The following set list was obtained from the concert held on January 31, 2025, in Mexico City. It may not represent all concerts for the duration of the tour.

Act 1 – Inception

1. "Somewhere I Belong"
2. "Crawling"
3. "New Divide"
4. "The Emptiness Machine"

Act 2 – Creation

5. "The Catalyst"
6. "Burn It Down"
7. "Over Each Other"
8. "Waiting for the End"
9. "Castle of Glass"
10. "Two Faced"
11. "Empty Spaces"
12. "When They Come for Me" / "Remember the Name"
13. "Casualty"
14. "One Step Closer"

Act 3 – Collapse

15. "Lost"
16. "Good Things Go"
17. "What I've Done"

Act 4 – Kintsugi

18. "Overflow"
19. "Numb"
20. "In the End"
21. "Faint"

Act 5 – Resolution (Encore)

22. "Papercut"
23. "A Place for My Head"
24. "Heavy Is the Crown"
25. "Bleed It Out"

== Tour dates ==
List of 2024 concerts
Date (2024)	City	Country	Venue	Supporting acts	Attendance	Revenue
September 11	Inglewood (Note: Labeled as Los Angeles in promotional material.)	United States	Kia Forum	grandson	16,641 / 16,641	$2,129,559
September 16	Brooklyn (Note: Labeled as New York City in promotional material.)	United States	Barclays Center	grandson	15,993 / 15,993	$2,128,536
September 22	Hamburg	Germany	Barclays Arena	grandson	13,752 / 13,752	$1,534,615
September 24	London	England	The O_{2} Arena	grandson	19,330 / 19,330	$2,275,184
September 28	Incheon (Note: Labeled as Seoul in promotional material.)	South Korea	Inspire Arena	—N/a	13,639 / 13,639	$1,354,575
November 3	Nanterre (Note: Labeled as Paris in promotional material.)	France	Paris La Défense Arena	Sleep Token	39,255 / 39,255	$4,529,465
November 8	Arlington (Note: Labeled as Dallas in promotional material.)	United States	Globe Life Field	Bad Omens; Jean Dawson; Helmet	31,962 / 31,962	$3,354,774
November 11	Cota (Note: Labeled as Bogotá in promotional material.)	Colombia	Coliseo MedPlus	—N/a	19,887 / 19,887	$1,647,641
November 15	São Paulo	Brazil	Allianz Parque	Ego Kill Talent	96,927 / 96,927	$8,601,259
November 16	São Paulo	Brazil	Allianz Parque	Ego Kill Talent	96,927 / 96,927	$8,601,259
December 12 (Note: The performance on December 12, 2024, was a part of Soundstorm Festival.)	Riyadh	Saudi Arabia	Banban	—N/a	—N/a	—N/a

List of 2025 concerts
Date (2025)	City	Country	Venue	Supporting acts	Attendance	Revenue
January 31	Mexico City	Mexico	Estadio GNP Seguros	AFI	64,442 / 64,442	$5,564,610
February 3	Zapopan (Note: Labeled as Guadalajara in promotional material.)	Mexico	Estadio Tres de Marzo	AFI	23,056 / 23,056	$2,289,976
February 5	Monterrey	Mexico	Estadio Banorte	AFI	19,944 / 19,944	$2,009,723
February 11	Saitama	Japan	Saitama Super Arena	—N/a	39,730 / 39,730	$5,964,927
February 12	Saitama	Japan	Saitama Super Arena	—N/a	39,730 / 39,730	$5,964,927
February 16	Jakarta	Indonesia	Gelora Bung Karno Madya Stadium	—N/a	20,793 / 20,793	$3,494,768
April 26	Austin	United States	Moody Center	grandson	—	—
April 28	Tulsa	United States	BOK Center	grandson	—	—
May 1	Grand Rapids	United States	Van Andel Arena	grandson	—	—
May 3	Baltimore	United States	CFG Bank Arena	grandson	—	—
May 6	Raleigh	United States	Lenovo Center	grandson	—	—
May 8	Greenville	United States	Bon Secours Wellness Arena	grandson	—	—
May 10 (Note: The performance on May 10, 2025, was a part of the Sonic Temple festival.)	Columbus	United States	Historic Crew Stadium	—N/a	—N/a	—N/a
May 17 (Note: The performance on May 17, 2025, was a part of the Welcome to Rockville festival.)	Daytona Beach	United States	Daytona International Speedway	—N/a	—N/a	—N/a
June 12 (Note: The performance on June 12, 2025, was part of the Nova Rock festival.)	Nickelsdorf	Austria	Panonia Fields	—N/a	—N/a	—N/a
June 14 (Note: The performance on June 14, 2025, was part of the Rock for People festival.)	Hradec Králové	Czech Republic	Hradec Králové Airport	—N/a	—N/a	—N/a
June 16	Hannover	Germany	Niedersachsenstadion	Architects grandson	41,213 / 41,213	$5,300,000
June 18	Berlin	Germany	Olympiastadion	Architects grandson	—	—
June 22 (Note: The performance on June 22, 2025, was part of Hellfest.)	Clisson	France	Val de Moine	—N/a	—N/a	—N/a
June 24 (Note: The performance on June 24, 2025, was part of the I-Days Milano festival.)	Milan	Italy	Ippodromo La Maura	—N/a	—N/a	—N/a
June 26	Arnhem	Netherlands	Gelredome	Spiritbox	—	—
June 28	London	England	Wembley Stadium	Spiritbox; JPEGMafia	75,600 / 75,600	$10,600,000
July 1	Düsseldorf	Germany	Merkur Spiel-Arena	Architects; JPEGMafia	44,963 / 44,963	$6,189,659
July 3 (Note: The performance on July 3, 2025, was part of the Rock Werchter festival.)	Werchter	Belgium	Werchter Festivalpark	—N/a	—N/a	—N/a
July 5 (Note: The performance on July 5, 2025, was part of the Open'er festival.)	Gdynia	Poland	Gdynia-Kosakowo Airport	—N/a	—N/a	—N/a
July 8	Frankfurt	Germany	Deutsche Bank Park	Architects; JPEGMafia	88,200 / 88,200	$11,800,000
July 9	Frankfurt	Germany	Deutsche Bank Park	Architects; JPEGMafia	88,200 / 88,200	$11,800,000
July 11	Saint-Denis	France	Stade de France	One OK Rock; JPEGMafia	74,300 / 74,300	$9,100,000
July 29	Brooklyn	United States	Barclays Center	Pvris	—	—
July 31	Boston	United States	TD Garden	Pvris	—	—
August 1	Boston	United States	TD Garden	Pvris	—	—
August 3	Newark	United States	Prudential Center	Pvris	—	—
August 5	Montreal	Canada	Bell Centre	Pvris	—	—
August 6	Montreal	Canada	Bell Centre	Pvris	—	—
August 8	Toronto	Canada	Scotiabank Arena	Pvris	—	—
August 11	Chicago	United States	United Center	Pvris	—	—
August 14	Detroit	United States	Little Caesars Arena	Pvris	—	—
August 16	Philadelphia	United States	Xfinity Mobile Arena	Jean Dawson	—	—
August 19	Pittsburgh	United States	PPG Paints Arena	Jean Dawson	—	—
August 21	Nashville	United States	Bridgestone Arena	Jean Dawson	—	—
August 23	St. Louis	United States	Enterprise Center	Jean Dawson	—	—
August 25	Milwaukee	United States	Fiserv Forum	Jean Dawson	—	—
August 27	Minneapolis	United States	Target Center	Jean Dawson	—	—
August 29	Omaha	United States	CHI Health Center Omaha	Jean Dawson	—	—
August 31	Kansas City	United States	T-Mobile Center	Jean Dawson	—	—
September 3	Denver	United States	Ball Arena	Jean Dawson	—	—
September 6	Phoenix	United States	Footprint Center	Jean Dawson	—	—
September 13 (Note: Originally scheduled to occur at Dodger Stadium in Los Angeles, but was moved due to low demand.)	Inglewood	United States	Intuit Dome	JPEGMafia	—	—
September 15	San Jose	United States	SAP Center	JPEGMafia	—	—
September 17	Sacramento	United States	Golden 1 Center	JPEGMafia	—	—
September 19	Portland	United States	Moda Center	JPEGMafia	—	—
September 21	Vancouver	Canada	Rogers Arena	JPEGMafia	—	—
September 24	Seattle	United States	Climate Pledge Arena	JPEGMafia	—	—
October 25	Bogotá	Colombia	Distrito Verde	Poppy	—	—
October 28	Lima	Peru	Estadio San Marcos	Poppy	—	—
October 31	Buenos Aires	Argentina	Parque de la Ciudad	Poppy; Deny	—	—
November 2	Santiago	Chile	Estadio Nacional	Poppy; Tenemos Explosivos	—	—
November 5	Curitiba	Brazil	Estádio Couto Pereira	Poppy	—	—
November 8	São Paulo	Brazil	Estádio do Morumbi	Poppy	65,000 / 65,000	$6,900,000
November 11	Brasília	Brazil	Estádio Mané Garrincha	Poppy	—	—
November 16 (Note: The performance on November 16, 2025, was part of the Corona Capital festival.)	Mexico City	Mexico	Autódromo Hermanos Rodríguez	—N/a	—N/a	—N/a

List of 2026 concerts
Date (2026)	City	Country	Venue	Supporting acts	Attendance	Revenue
January 18	Sakhir	Bahrain	Al-Dana Amphitheatre	PeachPuffs	10,300 / 10,300	$500,000
January 20	Abu Dhabi	United Arab Emirates	Etihad Arena	PeachPuffs	14,200 / 14,200	$2,400,000
January 23	Bengaluru	India	Brigade Innovation Gardens	Bloodywood	35,500 / 35,500	$3,100,000
January 25 (Note: The performance on January 25, 2026, was part of the Lollapalooza India.)	Mumbai	India	Mahalaxmi Racecourse	—N/a	—N/a	—N/a
March 3	Brisbane	Australia	Brisbane Entertainment Centre	Polaris	24,200 / 24,200	$5,000,000
March 5	Brisbane	Australia	Brisbane Entertainment Centre	Polaris	24,200 / 24,200	$5,000,000
March 8	Melbourne	Australia	Rod Laver Arena	Polaris	30,200 / 30,200	$6,500,000
March 10	Melbourne	Australia	Rod Laver Arena	Polaris	30,200 / 30,200	$6,500,000
March 14	Sydney	Australia	Qudos Bank Arena	Polaris	37,600 / 37,600	$7,700,000
March 15	Sydney	Australia	Qudos Bank Arena	Polaris	37,600 / 37,600	$7,700,000
March 18	Auckland	New Zealand	Spark Arena	Vana	12,736 / 12,736	$2,700,000
May 29	Stockholm	Sweden	3Arena	Phantogram; Clipse	—	—
June 1	Hamburg	Germany	Volksparkstadion	Phantogram; Clipse	88,200 / 88,200	$9,100,000
June 3	Hamburg	Germany	Volksparkstadion	Phantogram; Clipse	88,200 / 88,200	$9,100,000
June 5 (Note: The performance on June 5, 2026, was part of the Rock am Ring.)	Nürburg	Germany	Nürburgring	—N/a	—N/a	—N/a
June 7 (Note: The performance on June 7, 2026, was part of the Rock im Park.)	Nuremberg	Germany	Zeppelinfeld	—N/a	—N/a	—N/a
June 9	Vienna	Austria	Ernst-Happel-Stadion	Phantogram; Clipse	—	—
June 11	Munich	Germany	Allianz Arena	Phantogram; Clipse	101,000 / 101,000	$10,500,000
June 12	Munich	Germany	Allianz Arena	Phantogram; Clipse	101,000 / 101,000	$10,500,000
June 14 (Note: The performance on June 14, 2026, was part of the Download Festival.)	Castle Donington	England	Donington Park	—N/a	—N/a	—N/a
June 16	Lyon	France	Groupama Stadium	Phantogram; Last Train	—	—
June 19 (Note: The performance on June 19, 2026, was part of the O Son do Camiño.)	Santiago de Compostela	Spain	Auditorio Monte do Gozo	—N/a	—N/a	—N/a
June 21 (Note: The performance on June 21, 2026, was part of the Rock in Rio Lisboa.)	Lisbon	Portugal	Parque Tejo	—N/a	—N/a	—N/a
June 23	Madrid	Spain	Auditorio Miguel Ríos	Phantogram; Clipse	—	—
June 24	Madrid	Spain	Auditorio Miguel Ríos	Phantogram; Clipse	—	—
June 26	Florence	Italy	Visarno Arena	Phantogram; Clipse	—	—
June 28 (Note: The performance on June 28, 2026, was part of the Werchter Parklife.)	Werchter	Belgium	Werchter Festivalpark	—N/a	—N/a	—N/a
June 30	Zurich	Switzerland	Letzigrund	Phantogram; Clipse	—	—
Total					1,177,827	$144,269,271

=== Cancelled dates ===
List of cancelled concerts
Date	City	Country	Venue	Reason	Ref.
April 12, 2025 (Note: The performance on April 12, 2025, was supposed to be a part of Sick New World.)	Winchester (Note: Labeled as Las Vegas in promotional material.)	United States	Las Vegas Festival Grounds	Festival cancelled due to low ticket sales	
June 20, 2025	Bern	Switzerland	Bernexpo	Medical issue	
November 8, 2025	Rio de Janeiro	Brazil	—N/a	Logistical reasons	
November 15, 2025	Porto Alegre	Brazil	—N/a	Logistical reasons	
March 12, 2026	Adelaide	Australia	Adelaide Entertainment Centre	Illness in the band	

== Personnel ==
=== Linkin Park ===
- Emily Armstrong – lead vocals, rhythm guitar, tambourine on "Cut the Bridge", drums on "Remember the Name"
- Colin Brittain – drums, percussion, backing vocals, guitar on "When They Come For Me" and "My December"
- Dave "Phoenix" Farrell – bass, backing vocals, rhythm guitar on "Leave Out All the Rest", synthesizer on "Stained", keyboards on "Good Things Go"
- Joe Hahn – turntables, samples, backing vocals
- Mike Shinoda – co-lead vocals, rap vocals, rhythm guitar, keyboards

=== Touring member ===
- Alex Feder – lead guitar, backing vocals, synthesizer on "Burn It Down"
