= Two Faced (song) =

Single by Linkin Park

from the album From Zero
- Released: November 13, 2024
- Genre: Nu metal; rap rock; hard rock
- Length: 3:03
- Label: Warner; Machine Shop
- Songwriters: Emily Armstrong; Colin Brittain; Brad Delson; Dave Farrell; Joe Hahn; Mike Shinoda
- Producer: Mike Shinoda

Linkin Park singles chronology
"Over Each Other" (2024)	"Two Faced" (2024)	"Up From the Bottom" (2025)

Music video
- "Two Faced" on YouTube

"Two Faced" is a song by American rock band Linkin Park. It was released as the fourth single from the band's eighth studio album, From Zero, on November 13, 2024, along with a music video and soared to the top of iTunes. Like "Heavy Is the Crown", it exhibits the nu metal and rap rock sound found on the band's older releases, such as Hybrid Theory and Meteora.

== Composition ==
"Two Faced" has been stylistically described as nu metal, hard rock, and rap rock. The song has been noted as a "[call back]" to Hybrid Theory and Meteora, particularly being compared to "One Step Closer." The song's themes involve betrayal and manipulation.

== Reception ==
The song was positively received by Maria Sherman of ABC News, who described is as one of the album's "most rewarding moments."

== Music video ==
The music video for "Two Faced" was directed by the band's turntablist Joe Hahn and was released on November 13, 2024. It was filmed on September 3, 2024, on the same stage they would hold the "From Zero" livestream two days later.

The video features the band in black coats performing the song on that stage. Alex Harris of Neon Music described the music video as "the video depicts the band performing in a space that feels constrictive, amplifying the tension that runs throughout the track."

== Personnel ==
Credits adapted from Tidal.

Linkin Park

- Emily Armstrong – vocals
- Colin Brittain – drums
- Brad Delson – lead guitar, piano
- Phoenix – bass
- Joe Hahn – turntables, samples, programming
- Mike Shinoda – rapping, backing vocals, rhythm guitar, keyboards

Additional personnel

- Colin Brittain – production
- Brad Delson – production
- Mike Shinoda – production, record engineering
- Linkin Park – composition
- Rich Costey – mixing
- Ethan Mates – record engineering
- Emerson Mancini – mastering
- Jeff Citron – mixing assistance

== Charts ==
=== Weekly charts ===
Weekly chart performance for "Two Faced"
Chart (2024–25)	Peak position
Australia Digital Tracks (ARIA)	49
Austria (Ö3 Austria Top 40)	7
Belgium (Ultratop 50 Flanders)	49
Belgium (Ultratop 50 Wallonia)	49
Brazil Hot 100 (Billboard)	55
Canada Hot 100 (Billboard)	57
Czech Republic (Singles Digitál Top 100)	10
France (SNEP)	49
Finland (Suomen virallinen lista)	38
Germany (GfK)	5
Global 200 (Billboard)	29
Greece International (IFPI)	22
Hungary (Single Top 40)	26
Ireland (IRMA)	68
Italy (FIMI)	82
Italy Airplay (FIMI)	76
Japan Hot Overseas (Billboard)	19
Latvia (LaIPA)	8
Lithuania (AGATA)	43
Luxembourg (Billboard)	7
Netherlands (Single Top 100)	51
New Zealand Hot Singles (RMNZ)	4
Poland (Polish Streaming Top 100)	32
Portugal (AFP)	30
Slovakia (Singles Digitál Top 100)	13
South Korea Download (Circle)	199
Sweden (Sverigetopplistan)	73
Switzerland (Schweizer Hitparade)	6
UK Singles (Official Charts)	22
UK Rock & Metal (Official Charts)	3
US Bubbling Under Hot 100 (Billboard)	7
US Hot Rock & Alternative Songs (Billboard)	14

=== Year-end charts ===
Year-end chart performance for "Two Faced"
Chart (2025)	Position
US Hot Hard Rock Songs (Billboard)	27

== Certifications ==
Certifications for "Two Faced"
Region	Certification	Certified units/sales
Brazil (Pro-Música Brasil)	2× Platinum	80,000^{‡}
France (SNEP)	Gold	100,000^{‡}
^{‡} Sales+streaming figures based on certification alone.

== Appearances ==
Two Faced is one of the featured songs in the soundtrack of the video game WWE 2K26.
