= List of number-one hits of 2024 (Germany) =

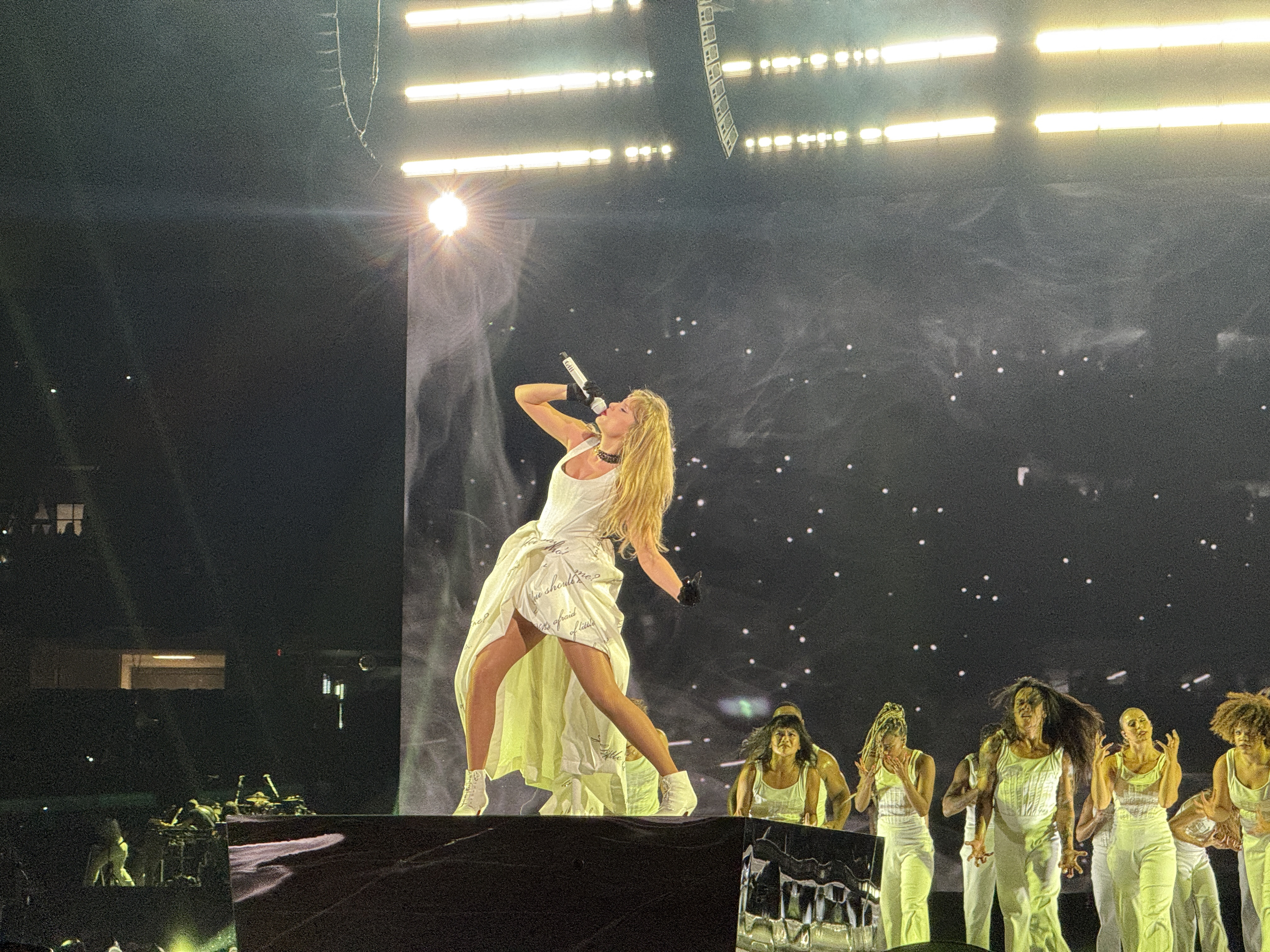
Artemas' "I Like the Way You Kiss Me" became the best-performing single of 2024, while Taylor Swift's (pictured) The Tortured Poets Department became the best-performing album of the year.

The GfK Entertainment charts are record charts compiled by GfK Entertainment on behalf of the German record industry. They include the "Single Top 100" and the "Album Top 100" chart. The chart week runs from Friday to Thursday, and the chart compilations are published on Tuesday for the record industry. The entire top 100 singles and top 100 albums are officially released the following Friday by GfK Entertainment. The charts are based on weekly physical and digital sales and streams of singles and albums, as well as the amount of airplay the songs receive on German radio stations.

== Number-one hits by week ==
Key
†	Indicates best-performing single and album of 2024

Issue date	Song	Artist	Ref.	Album	Artist	Ref.
5 January	"Wonderful Life"	6PM Records featuring Luciano, Hurts and Sira		Nummer eins	Ikke Hüftgold	
12 January	"Time"	Luciano		Fieber	OG Keemo	
19 January	"Vois sur ton chemin"	Bennett		Ninetynine	Jazeek	
26 January	"Vois sur ton chemin"	Bennett		Phönix aus der Asche	Fantasy	
2 February	"Zornig"	Ski Aggu		40 Jahre Onkelz – Live im Waldstadion	Böhse Onkelz	
9 February	"I Don't Care"	Twenty4tim		How Have You Been?	Giant Rooks	
16 February	"One Night Stand"	Finch, Katja Krasavice, Luca-Dante Spadafora featuring Niklas Dee		Vom Rand der Zeit	Olli Schulz	
23 February	"Lieb mich"	Ayliva		Vultures 1	Kanye West and Ty Dolla Sign	
1 March	"Beautiful Things"	Benson Boone		Seductive	Luciano	
8 March	"Beautiful Things"	Benson Boone		The Mandrake Project	Bruce Dickinson	
15 March	"Beautiful Things"	Benson Boone		Invincible Shield	Judas Priest	
22 March	"Beautiful Things"	Benson Boone		Back in Black	AC/DC	
29 March	"Beautiful Things"	Benson Boone		Off	Alligatoah	
5 April	"I Like the Way You Kiss Me" †	Artemas		Cowboy Carter	Beyoncé	
12 April	"I Like the Way You Kiss Me" †	Artemas		Gute Laune ungerecht verteilt	Kettcar	
19 April	"I Like the Way You Kiss Me" †	Artemas		One Deep River	Mark Knopfler	
26 April	"I Like the Way You Kiss Me" †	Artemas		The Tortured Poets Department †	Taylor Swift	
3 May	"Wunder"	Ayliva featuring Apache 207		Zeitreise / Live im Sartory	Niedeckens BAP	
10 May	"Wunder"	Ayliva featuring Apache 207		Nach Haus	Reinhard Mey	
17 May	"Wunder"	Ayliva featuring Apache 207		The Tortured Poets Department †	Taylor Swift	
24 May	"Wunder"	Ayliva featuring Apache 207		Hit Me Hard and Soft	Billie Eilish	
31 May	"Mittelmeer"	Pashanim		Clancy	Twenty One Pilots	
7 June	"Mittelmeer"	Pashanim		Kult	Roy Bianco & Die Abbrunzati Boys	
14 June	"Wunder"	Ayliva featuring Apache 207		Finsterwacht	Saltatio Mortis	
21 June	"Zeit, dass sich was dreht"	Soho Bani featuring Herbert Grönemeyer and Ericson		2000	Pashanim	
28 June	"Zeit, dass sich was dreht"	Soho Bani featuring Herbert Grönemeyer and Ericson		Görlitzer Park	K.I.Z	
5 July	"Zeit, dass sich was dreht"	Soho Bani featuring Herbert Grönemeyer and Ericson		Eurosport	Dardan and Azet	
12 July	"Zeit, dass sich was dreht"	Soho Bani featuring Herbert Grönemeyer and Ericson		Back with a Bang!	Kissin' Dynamite	
19 July	"Wunder"	Ayliva featuring Apache 207		The Tortured Poets Department †	Taylor Swift	
26 July	"Wunder"	Ayliva featuring Apache 207		=1	Deep Purple	
2 August	"Bauch Beine Po"	Shirin David		Wake Up the Wicked	Powerwolf	
9 August	"Bauch Beine Po"	Shirin David		Still King	Kollegah	
16 August	"Bauch Beine Po"	Shirin David		Jugend von gestern	Goitzsche Front	
23 August	"Bauch Beine Po"	Shirin David		In Liebe	Ayliva	
30 August	"Bauch Beine Po"	Shirin David		In Liebe	Ayliva	
6 September	"Bauch Beine Po"	Shirin David		Wilmersdorfs Kind	Ski Aggu	
13 September	"The Emptiness Machine"	Linkin Park		Luck and Strange	David Gilmour	
20 September	"The Emptiness Machine"	Linkin Park		Kinder der Nacht	01099	
27 September	"The Emptiness Machine"	Linkin Park		Stimmen der Nacht	Die Amigos	
4 October	"The Emptiness Machine"	Linkin Park		1331	Weimar	
11 October	"The Emptiness Machine"	Linkin Park		Moon Music	Coldplay	
18 October	"The Emptiness Machine"	Linkin Park		We Love Rock'n'Roll (Leipzig-Live-2024)	Peter Maffay	
25 October	"The Emptiness Machine"	Linkin Park		Andrea Berg	Andrea Berg	
1 November	"The Emptiness Machine"	Linkin Park		Best Of – 25 Jahre SDP	SDP	
8 November	"The Emptiness Machine"	Linkin Park		Songs of a Lost World	The Cure	
15 November	"The Emptiness Machine"	Linkin Park		Songs of a Lost World	The Cure	
22 November	"The Emptiness Machine"	Linkin Park		From Zero	Linkin Park	
29 November	"All I Want for Christmas Is You"	Mariah Carey		From Zero	Linkin Park	
6 December	"All I Want for Christmas Is You"	Mariah Carey		The Tortured Poets Department †	Taylor Swift	
13 December	"All I Want for Christmas Is You"	Mariah Carey		Unsterblich	Die Toten Hosen	
20 December	"Last Christmas"	Wham!		Live in Bielefeld	Casper	
27 December	"All I Want for Christmas Is You"	Mariah Carey		Christmas	Michael Bublé	
