= Over Each Other =

Single by Linkin Park

from the album From Zero
- Released: October 24, 2024
- Genre: Pop rock; alternative rock
- Length: 2:50
- Label: Warner; Machine Shop
- Songwriters: Emily Armstrong; Colin Brittain; Brad Delson; Dave Farrell; Joe Hahn; Mike Shinoda; Jon Green; Matias Mora
- Producer: Mike Shinoda

Linkin Park singles chronology
"Heavy Is the Crown" (2024)	"Over Each Other" (2024)	"Two Faced" (2024)

Music video
- "Over Each Other" on YouTube

"Over Each Other" is a song by American rock band Linkin Park. It was released as the third single from the band's eighth studio album, From Zero, on October 24, 2024.

== Background ==
On October 18, 2024, the band's turntablist Joe Hahn revealed on Instagram that the album's third single would be "Over Each Other" and would be released alongside a music video on October 24. To promote the song, a preview of the music video appeared on a billboard in Times Square, New York City. On the day of the release, the song was premiered worldwide for the first time as BBC Radio One's "Hottest Record" on the New Music Show segment with Jack Saunders.

== Composition ==
"Over Each Other" has been stylistically described as a pop rock, and alternative rock ballad. The lyrics talk about a failing relationship where arguments and fights are present, hence the lyrics "All we are is talking over each other".

== Music video ==
The music video for "Over Each Other" was released shortly after the song's world premiere on October 24, 2024. It was directed by Joe Hahn and was filmed in Seoul, South Korea, the first of the band's videos to ever be filmed in the country; Hahn, of Korean heritage, described it as a "dream" of his to film a project in the country.

The video features the band's vocalist Emily Armstrong and Korean actress Kong Seong-Ha portraying girlfriends who get into an argument in a bathroom and in a car, which leads to a car crash. After being unable to rescue Kong, Armstrong runs to get help. The emergency services later rescue Kong, discovering Armstrong has perished in the crash implying her appearances have been as a ghost. Gregory Adams of Revolver described the ending of the video as a "Shyamalan-like twist."

== Personnel ==
Credits adapted from Tidal.

Linkin Park

- Emily Armstrong – vocals, composition
- Colin Brittain – drums, composition, co-production
- Brad Delson – guitars, composition, co-production
- Dave "Phoenix" Farrell – bass, composition
- Joe Hahn – programming, composition
- Mike Shinoda – vocals, composition, production, record engineering

Additional personnel

- Matias Mora – additional production, composition
- Jon Green – composition
- Ethan Mates – record engineering
- Neal Avron – mixing
- Scott Skrzynski – assistant mixing
- Emerson Mancini – mastering

== Charts ==
=== Weekly charts ===
Weekly chart performance for "Over Each Other"
Chart (2024–25)	Peak position
Australia Digital Tracks (ARIA)	24
Austria (Ö3 Austria Top 40)	9
Brazil Hot 100 (Billboard)	90
Canada Hot 100 (Billboard)	86
Czech Republic Airplay (ČNS IFPI)	51
Czech Republic (Singles Digitál Top 100)	19
France (SNEP)	67
Germany (GfK)	11
Global 200 (Billboard)	68
Greece International (IFPI)	95
Italy Rock Airplay (FIMI)	16
Japan Download Songs (Billboard)	89
Japan Hot Overseas (Billboard)	16
Luxembourg (Billboard)	13
New Zealand Hot Singles (RMNZ)	14
Poland (Polish Streaming Top 100)	82
Portugal (AFP)	50
Slovakia (Singles Digitál Top 100)	37
Sweden Heatseeker (Sverigetopplistan)	6
Switzerland (Schweizer Hitparade)	15
UK Singles (Official Charts)	57
US Hot Rock & Alternative Songs (Billboard)	24

=== Monthly charts ===
Monthly chart performance for "Over Each Other"
Chart (2025)	Peak position
Czech Republic (Rádio Top 100)	77

=== Year-end charts ===
Year-end chart performance for "Over Each Other"
Chart (2025)	Position
US Hot Hard Rock Songs (Billboard)	29

== Certifications ==
Certifications for "Over Each Other"
Region	Certification	Certified units/sales
Brazil (Pro-Música Brasil)	2× Platinum	80,000^{‡}
^{‡} Sales+streaming figures based on certification alone.
