= The Emptiness Machine =

- CD single cover art

Single by Linkin Park

from the album From Zero
- Released: September 5, 2024
- Genre: Hard rock; alternative rock; alternative metal
- Length: 3:10
- Label: Warner; Machine Shop
- Songwriters: Emily Armstrong; Colin Brittain; Brad Delson; Dave Farrell; Joe Hahn; Mike Shinoda
- Producer: Mike Shinoda

Linkin Park singles chronology
"Qwerty" (2024)	"The Emptiness Machine" (2024)	"Heavy Is the Crown" (2024)

Music video
- "The Emptiness Machine" on YouTube

"The Emptiness Machine" is a song by American rock band Linkin Park. It was released as the lead single from the band's eighth studio album, From Zero, on September 5, 2024. This is the band's first single to feature Emily Armstrong on vocals and Colin Brittain on drums, as well as the first single not to feature former members Chester Bennington and Rob Bourdon.

At the 68th Annual Grammy Awards the song was nominated for Best Rock Performance. The song was also nominated for Top Hard Rock Song at the 2024 Billboard Music Awards and won for Favorite Rock Song at the American Music Awards of 2025.

The track was a commercial success across the globe, charting at number one in Austria, Belgium, the Czech Republic, Germany, Latvia, Luxembourg, Portugal, and Switzerland as well as the top 20 in Brazil, Canada, Croatia, Finland, France, Greece, India, Ireland, Lithuania, Malaysia, Mexico, Morocco, New Zealand, Norway, Poland, Sweden, the United Kingdom.

== Release ==
On August 24, 2024, the band launched a 100-hour countdown, furthering speculation on the recent reunion rumors. Upon the expiration of the timer, the band teased the fans as the clock started to tick back up, before glitching for a few seconds on 09:05, leading to speculation that there could be an announcement on September 5, which the band later confirmed on their social media accounts.

On September 5, at a fan event held in Los Angeles, California, the band officially reunited and performed "The Emptiness Machine" live for the first time at Warner Bros. Television Studios, while simultaneously releasing the song as the lead single from their newly announced eighth studio album, From Zero. This was Linkin Park's first public performance with new members Emily Armstrong and Colin Brittain.

On September 17, the band appeared on The Tonight Show Starring Jimmy Fallon. After Shinoda's sitdown interview with Jimmy Fallon, the whole band performed the song live, making it the first televised appearance of the new lineup.

On August 7, 2025, it was announced that the song would be included in the soundtrack for Madden NFL 26.

== Composition ==
Revolver described "The Emptiness Machine" as "a supercharged rock anthem in the tried-and-true LP tradition." More specifically, the song has been described as hard rock, alternative rock, and alternative metal.

== Commercial performance ==
In the United States, "The Emptiness Machine" made an instant impact on rock radio within its first six hours of release, debuting at number 24 on Billboard's Rock Airplay chart. Despite being released at the tail-end of the tracking week, the song simultaneously debuted on the Hot Hard Rock Songs chart at number 7, selling 1,000 digital downloads and racking up 690,000 streams in its first six hours. In its first full tracking week, the song tallied up 13,400,000 streams and 8,000 downloads, debuting at number 21 on the Billboard Hot 100 and number 3 on the Hot Rock & Alternative Songs, while topping the Hot Hard Rock Songs and Rock Airplay charts. In the process, "The Emptiness Machine" became the band's highest-charting song in the United States in fifteen years since 2009's "New Divide" that peaked at number 6, only being denied as a Top 20 hit by Morgan Wallen's "Cowgirls".

In the United Kingdom, "The Emptiness Machine" was battling for the band's first chart-topping single on the UK Singles Chart, trailing only to Sabrina Carpenter's "Taste" in the midweek update with 14,101 sales. At the end of the week, the song debuted at number four, becoming their highest-ever charting song on the chart, beating "What I've Done", which peaked at number six in 2007, with their best opening week performance in the UK for a single release totalling 38,898 units. Simultaneously, the song debuted atop the UK Singles Sales Chart and UK Singles Downloads Chart, gifting the band their first ever UK number one on pure sales in the country with 2,561 downloads; it also spent six non-consecutive weeks at the summit of the UK Rock & Metal Singles Chart. By November 2024, "The Emptiness Machine" had already achieved 176,137 chart sales in the UK. The week following the album's release, the song rebounded into the UK's Top 10 and got certified Silver by the British Phonographic Industry for 200,000 units. In June 2025, the song got certified Gold for surpassing 400,000 units.

The song debuted atop the German Singles Chart, becoming the band's first number-one single in Germany, and their highest chart entry since 2012, where "Burn It Down" peaked at number 2. It stayed at number one for eleven consecutive weeks, becoming the longest-running number one of the entire calendar year in the country. Elsewhere in Europe, "The Emptiness Machine" was also a number one hit in Austria, Czech Republic, Latvia, Luxembourg, Portugal and Switzerland.

In Ireland, "The Emptiness Machine" debuted at number 16 on the Irish Singles Chart, their highest-charting song since 2007, where "What I've Done" peaked at number 15.

Worldwide, the song debuted at number three on the Billboard Global 200 chart with 74 million streams and 19,000 sales sold in its first full week, making "The Emptiness Machine" the first song by the band to become a top-10 hit on the chart.

== Accolades ==
List of awards and nominations
Year	Ceremony	Category	Result	Ref.
2024	Billboard Music Awards	Top Hard Rock Song	Nominated	
2025	American Music Awards	Favorite Rock Song	Won	
2025	iHeartRadio Music Awards	Alternative Song of the Year	Nominated	
2025	iHeartRadio Music Awards	Rock Song of the Year	Nominated	
2025	MTV Video Music Awards	Best Rock	Nominated	
2026	Grammy Awards	Best Rock Performance	Nominated	

== Track listing ==
Digital download
No.	Title	Length
1.	"The Emptiness Machine"	3:10

CD single
No.	Title	Length
1.	"The Emptiness Machine"	3:12
2.	"The Emptiness Machine" (instrumental)	3:12
Total length:		6:24

== Music video ==
The music video introduces the band's new vocalist Emily Armstrong in a bar, where she buys a drink as she looks at her phone.

The music video for "The Emptiness Machine" was directed by the band's turntablist Joe Hahn and was filmed in Los Angeles, California in late July 2024. It was published on YouTube and released on September 5, 2024.

The video features glitchy visuals as the band members, who are shown living mundane lives and working dead-end jobs, are randomly teleported to numerous locations. Mike Shinoda is also seen painting a picture featured on the single CD cover. Similar to the music video for "New Divide", data moshing was used to transition to the final scene, which features the whole band performing on a platform. Motion capture is used for the particle effects during the music video's finale.

== Personnel ==
Linkin Park

- Emily Armstrong – vocals
- Colin Brittain – drums
- Brad Delson – lead guitar, piano
- Dave "Phoenix" Farrell – bass guitar
- Joe Hahn – samples, programming, turntables
- Mike Shinoda – vocals, rhythm guitar, keyboards, sampler

Additional personnel

- Neal Avron – mixing
- Colin Brittain – co-production
- Brad Delson – co-production
- Linkin Park – composition
- Emerson Mancini – mastering
- Ethan Mates – record engineering
- Mike Shinoda – production, record engineering
- Scott Skrzynski – assistant mixing

== Charts ==
=== Weekly charts ===
Weekly chart performance for "The Emptiness Machine"
Chart (2024–2025)	Peak position
Australia (ARIA)	27
Austria (Ö3 Austria Top 40)	1
Belarus Airplay (TopHit)	111
Belgium (Ultratop 50 Flanders)	14
Belgium (Ultratop 50 Wallonia)	14
Bolivia (Billboard)	20
Brazil Hot 100 (Billboard)	5
Canada Hot 100 (Billboard)	12
Canada Mainstream Rock (Billboard Canada)	1
Central America Anglo Airplay (Monitor Latino)	7
CIS Airplay (TopHit)	102
Colombia Anglo Airplay (Monitor Latino)	7
Costa Rica Anglo Airplay (Monitor Latino)	5
Croatia (Billboard)	10
Czech Republic Airplay (ČNS IFPI)	1
Czech Republic Singles Digital (ČNS IFPI)	1
Czech Republic Modern Rock (IFPI)	1
Denmark (Tracklisten)	35
Ecuador Anglo Airplay (Monitor Latino)	7
El Salvador Anglo Airplay (Monitor Latino)	9
Estonia Airplay (TopHit)	42
Finland (Suomen virallinen lista)	5
France (SNEP)	12
Germany (GfK)	1
Global 200 (Billboard)	3
Greece International (IFPI)	4
Guatemala Anglo Airplay (Monitor Latino)	2
Honduras Anglo Airplay (Monitor Latino)	11
Hungary (Single Top 40)	7
Iceland (Tónlistinn)	22
India International (IMI)	18
Ireland (IRMA)	16
Israel (Mako Hitlist)	94
Italy (FIMI)	34
Japan Digital Singles (Oricon)	42
Japan Download Songs (Billboard)	42
Japan Hot Overseas (Billboard)	2
Latvia Streaming (LaIPA)	1
Lebanon (Lebanese Top 20)	10
Lithuania (AGATA)	7
Luxembourg (Billboard)	1
Malaysia (Billboard)	13
Malaysia International (RIM)	12
Mexico Anglo Airplay (Monitor Latino)	7
Netherlands (Dutch Top 40)	21
Netherlands (Single Top 100)	15
New Zealand (Recorded Music NZ)	18
Norway (VG-lista)	10
Panama Anglo Airplay (Monitor Latino)	11
Paraguay Anglo Airplay (Monitor Latino)	17
Peru (Billboard)	24
Poland (Polish Streaming Top 100)	10
Portugal (AFP)	1
Romania (Billboard)	12
Singapore (RIAS)	12
Slovakia Airplay (ČNS IFPI)	18
Slovakia Singles Digital (ČNS IFPI)	2
Slovenia Airplay (Radiomonitor)	15
South Africa (Billboard)	15
South Korea Download (Circle)	95
South Korea BGM (Circle)	131
Spain (PROMUSICAE)	27
Sweden (Sverigetopplistan)	14
Switzerland (Schweizer Hitparade)	1
Taiwan (Billboard)	24
Ukraine Airplay (TopHit)	192
UK Singles (Official Charts)	4
UK Rock & Metal (Official Charts)	1
Uruguay Anglo Airplay (Monitor Latino)	11
US Billboard Hot 100	21
US Hot Rock & Alternative Songs (Billboard)	3
US Rock & Alternative Airplay (Billboard)	1
Venezuela Anglo Airplay (Monitor Latino)	10

=== Monthly charts ===
Monthly chart performance for "The Emptiness Machine"
Chart (2024–2025)	Peak position
Brazil Streaming (Pro-Música Brasil)	15
Czech Republic (Rádio Top 100)	1
Czech Republic (Singles Digitál Top 100)	1
Czech Republic Modern Rock (IFPI)	1
Estonia Airplay (TopHit)	63
Lithuania Airplay (TopHit)	18
Slovakia (Rádio Top 100)	24
Slovakia (Singles Digitál Top 100)	2

=== Year-end charts ===
Year-end chart performance for "The Emptiness Machine"
Chart (2024)	Position
Austria (Ö3 Austria Top 40)	11
Canada Digital Song Sales (Billboard)	59
Germany (GfK)	26
Lithuania Airplay (TopHit)	194
Portugal (AFP)	96
Switzerland (Schweizer Hitparade)	39
US Hot Rock & Alternative Songs (Billboard)	71
US Rock & Alternative Airplay (Billboard)	23
Venezuela Rock (Record Report)	19

Chart (2025)	Position
Austria (Ö3 Austria Top 40)	5
Belgium (Ultratop 50 Flanders)	105
Belgium (Ultratop 50 Wallonia)	100
Canada Mainstream Rock (Billboard)	2
France (SNEP)	140
Germany (GfK)	6
Global 200 (Billboard)	117
Lithuania Airplay (TopHit)	200
Switzerland (Schweizer Hitparade)	17
US Hot Rock & Alternative Songs (Billboard)	30
US Rock & Alternative Airplay (Billboard)	4

== Certifications ==
Certifications for "The Emptiness Machine"
Region	Certification	Certified units/sales
Australia (ARIA)	Platinum	70,000^{‡}
Austria (IFPI Austria)	2× Platinum	60,000^{‡}
Belgium (BRMA)	Gold	20,000^{‡}
Brazil (Pro-Música Brasil)	2× Diamond	320,000^{‡}
Canada (Music Canada)	2× Platinum	160,000^{‡}
Denmark (IFPI Danmark)	Gold	45,000^{‡}
France (SNEP)	Diamond	333,333^{‡}
Germany (BVMI)	3× Gold	900,000^{‡}
Italy (FIMI)	Gold	50,000^{‡}
New Zealand (RMNZ)	Platinum	30,000^{‡}
Poland (ZPAV)	Platinum	125,000^{‡}
Portugal (AFP)	3× Platinum	75,000^{‡}
Spain (Promusicae)	Platinum	100,000^{‡}
Switzerland (IFPI Switzerland)	Platinum	30,000^{‡}
United Kingdom (BPI)	Platinum	600,000^{‡}
Streaming
Czech Republic (ČNS IFPI)	Platinum	5,000,000
Slovakia (ČNS IFPI)	Platinum	1,700,000
^{‡} Sales+streaming figures based on certification alone.
