= Heavy Is the Crown (Linkin Park song) =

Single by Linkin Park

from the album From Zero
- Released: September 24, 2024
- Genre: Nu metal; rap rock
- Length: 2:47
- Label: Warner; Machine Shop
- Songwriters: Emily Armstrong; Colin Brittain; Brad Delson; Dave Farrell; Joe Hahn; Mike Shinoda; Mike Elizondo
- Producer: Mike Shinoda

Linkin Park singles chronology
"The Emptiness Machine" (2024)	"Heavy Is the Crown" (2024)	"Over Each Other" (2024)

Music video
- "Heavy Is the Crown" on YouTube

"Heavy Is the Crown" is a song by American rock band Linkin Park. It was released on September 24, 2024, as the second single from the band's eighth studio album, From Zero. The song serves as the anthem for Riot Games' 2024 League of Legends World Championship. An abridged version of the song with newly recorded vocals by Emily Armstrong and Mike Shinoda appears in the soundtrack for the second season of Arcane.

== Composition ==
Stylistically, "Heavy is the Crown" is described as a nu metal and rap rock song. Emily Armstrong's vocals are compared to the late Chester Bennington's by Emmy Mack of Music Feeds, who stated "It's actually really easy to imagine Chester singing this one", and described the chorus as "gritty".

== Release ==
"Heavy Is the Crown" is the second song released by the band since their return with new vocalist Emily Armstrong and drummer Colin Brittain, following a hiatus that lasted since 2017 due to the death of former vocalist Chester Bennington. First performed live on September 22, 2024, during a performance at the Barclays Arena in Hamburg, Germany, during the From Zero World Tour, the track was released as the second single from their eighth studio album, From Zero, on September 24, 2024. It was accompanied by a music video themed after Riot Games' video game League of Legends, serving as the theme song for its 2024 World Championship. The band would also perform the song during the opening ceremony for the grand finals, held at The O2 Arena on November 2. A version of the song, as produced by Mike Shinoda and Alex Seaver of Mako, also appeared on the soundtrack for the second season of the television series Arcane. The song was also chosen to be the main theme of the 2026 Royal Rumble, one of the biggest annual professional wrestling events for WWE, taking place on January 31 in Riyadh, Saudi Arabia. This also marks the first song by the band to be used as a theme for a WWE event.

== Reception ==
Gregory Adams of Revolver magazine wrote: "Fueled by hungrily melodic guitar hooks and a propulsive and bouncy, Meteora-esque beat, ['Heavy Is the Crown'] bursts out the gate with a classic Mike Shinoda rap. Armstrong recalls late vocalist Chester Bennington's rasp, while also bringing some big screams of her own." The song became the band's seventh No. 1 on Billboard's Rock & Alternative Airplay chart, moving them into sole possession of the third-most No. 1's in the chart's history. It also became the band's twenty-first top 10 song on the Alternative Airplay chart, tying for the fifth-most songs by any artist in the chart's history.

== Accolades ==
List of awards and nominations
Year	Ceremony	Category	Result	Ref.
2025	Webby Awards	Media & Entertainment: Advertising, Media & PR	Won	
2026	iHeartRadio Music Awards	Rock Song of the Year	Won	

== Music video ==
The music video for "Heavy Is the Crown" was directed by Eddy.tv, and premiered on YouTube on September 24, 2024.

It is an animated music video that depicts real life League of Legends pro esports players in their respective teams, attacking the castle of T1, the reigning world champion at the time, where the band is performing the song. As the song progresses, the teams fight the reigning group on the castle grounds as the castle starts crumbling around the band, turning into ruins as the song ends. While the video was heavily praised for its animation and visuals, the music video attracted some controversy from League of Legends fans who argued that the band took over too much screen time over the depicted players who were more deserving of it. Aaron Down of PCGamesN described the video as having an "identity crisis", elaborating that the video lacked focus and struggled to find a balance between the storyline and the band performance, adding that the frequent cuts disrupted the flow of the video.

== Personnel ==
Credits adapted from Tidal.

Linkin Park

- Emily Armstrong – lead vocals
- Colin Brittain – drums
- Brad Delson – lead guitar, piano
- Dave "Phoenix" Farrell – bass guitar
- Joe Hahn – samples, programming, turntables
- Mike Shinoda – rhythm guitar, keyboards, samplers, programming, co-lead, rap and backing vocals

Additional personnel

- Colin Brittain – production
- Brad Delson – production
- Mike Shinoda – production, record engineering
- Linkin Park – composition
- Mike Elizondo – additional production, composition
- Rich Costey – mixing
- Emerson Mancini – mastering
- Ethan Mates – record engineering
- Jeff Citron – assistant mixing

== In popular culture ==
- "Heavy Is the Crown" was used as the opening theme for the 2024 League of Legends World Championship.
- A re-recorded version of the song was featured in the soundtrack for the second season of Arcane (2024).
- In 2025, the band performed the song at the UEFA Champions League final at the Allianz Arena in Munich, Germany as part of the kickoff show, prior to PSG vs Inter Milan.
- The song was used in a promo package prior to the NHL 2025 Stanley Cup Final.
- In 2026, "Heavy Is the Crown" was the official theme song of WWE's Royal Rumble pay-per-view in Riyadh, Saudi Arabia.

== Charts ==
=== Weekly charts ===
Weekly chart performance for "Heavy Is the Crown"
Chart (2024–25)	Peak position
Australia (ARIA)	68
Austria (Ö3 Austria Top 40)	2
Belgium (Ultratop 50 Flanders)	41
Belgium (Ultratop 50 Wallonia)	42
Brazil Hot 100 (Billboard)	30
Canada Hot 100 (Billboard)	40
Canada Mainstream Rock (Billboard)	3
Czech Republic Singles Digital (ČNS IFPI)	2
Estonia Airplay (TopHit)	113
Finland (Suomen virallinen lista)	23
France (SNEP)	33
Germany (GfK)	3
Global 200 (Billboard)	14
Greece International (IFPI)	15
Hungary (Single Top 40)	16
Ireland (IRMA)	49
Italy (FIMI)	72
Japan Download Songs (Billboard)	81
Japan Hot Overseas (Billboard)	9
Latvia (LaIPA)	8
Lithuania (AGATA)	28
Lithuania Airplay (TopHit)	48
Luxembourg (Billboard)	4
Netherlands (Single Top 100)	51
New Zealand Hot Singles (RMNZ)	2
Poland (Polish Streaming Top 100)	19
Portugal (AFP)	10
Slovakia Singles Digital (ČNS IFPI)	3
South Korea BGM (Circle)	153
South Korea Download (Circle)	75
Spain (PROMUSICAE)	62
Sweden (Sverigetopplistan)	38
Switzerland (Schweizer Hitparade)	3
UK Singles (Official Charts)	18
UK Rock & Metal (Official Charts)	2
US Billboard Hot 100	79
US Hot Rock & Alternative Songs (Billboard)	12
US Rock Airplay (Billboard)	1

=== Monthly charts ===
Monthly chart performance for "Heavy Is the Crown"
Chart (2024)	Peak position
Czech Republic (Singles Digitál Top 100)	3
Lithuania Airplay (TopHit)	82
Slovakia (Singles Digitál Top 100)	14

=== Year-end charts ===
Year-end chart performance for "Heavy Is the Crown"
Chart (2024)	Position
Austria (Ö3 Austria Top 40)	59
Germany (GfK)	80
Switzerland (Schweizer Hitparade)	100
US Hot Hard Rock Songs (Billboard)	30

Chart (2025)	Position
Canada Mainstream Rock (Billboard)	19
US Hot Rock & Alternative Songs (Billboard)	32
US Rock & Alternative Airplay (Billboard)	5

== Certifications ==
Certifications for "Heavy Is the Crown"
Region	Certification	Certified units/sales
Australia (ARIA)	Gold	35,000^{‡}
Austria (IFPI Austria)	Gold	15,000^{‡}
Brazil (Pro-Música Brasil)	Diamond	160,000^{‡}
Canada (Music Canada)	Gold	40,000^{‡}
France (SNEP)	Platinum	200,000^{‡}
Germany (BVMI)	Gold	300,000^{‡}
New Zealand (RMNZ)	Gold	15,000^{‡}
Poland (ZPAV)	Gold	25,000^{‡}
Portugal (AFP)	Gold	5,000^{‡}
Spain (Promusicae)	Gold	50,000^{‡}
Switzerland (IFPI Switzerland)	Gold	15,000^{‡}
United Kingdom (BPI)	Silver	200,000^{‡}
^{‡} Sales+streaming figures based on certification alone.
