= Alex Feder =

American musician (born 1984)

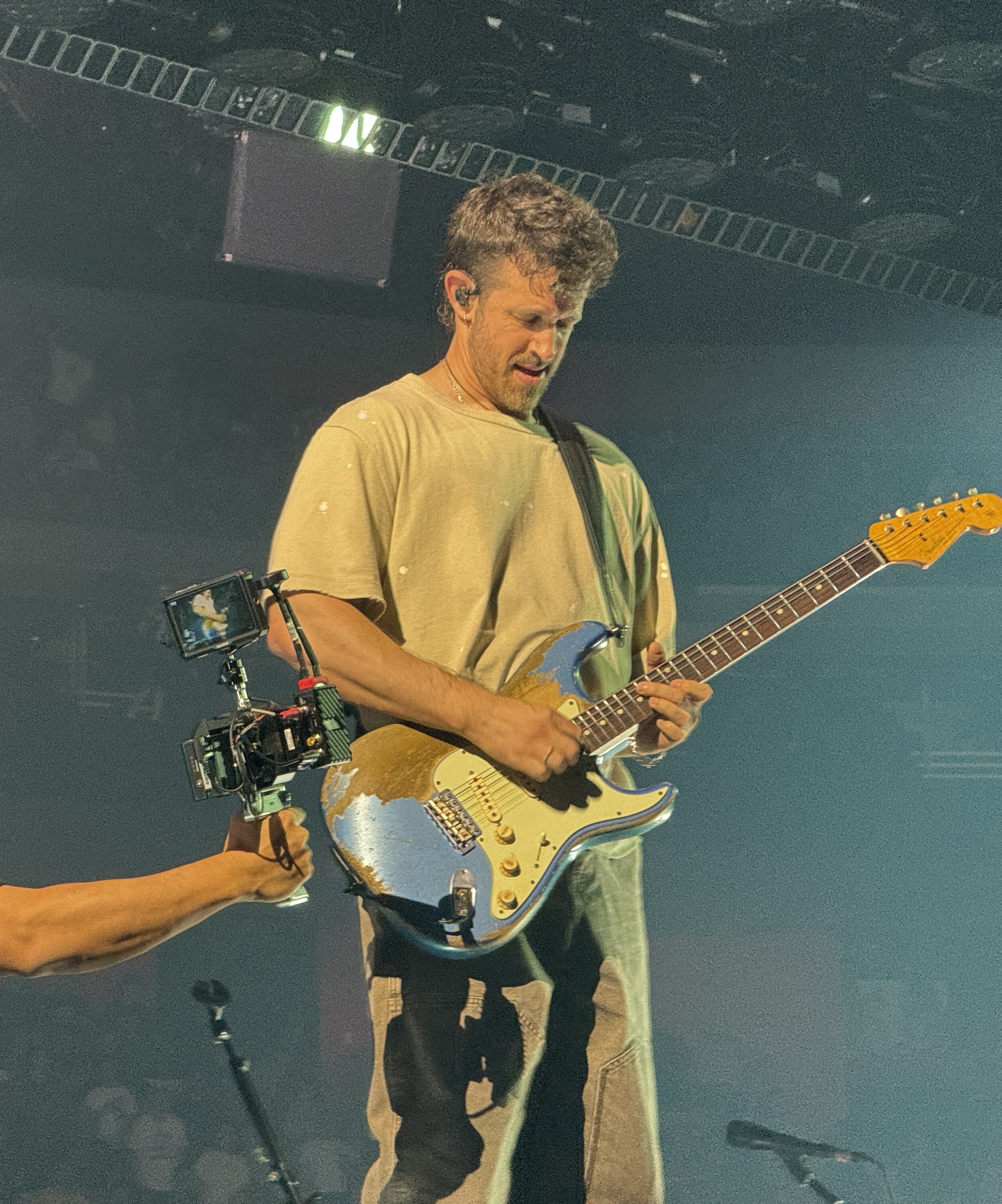
- Feder performing with Linkin Park in 2025

Background information
- Also known as: Leonard Friend
- Born: Alexander George Feder; November 20, 1982 (age 43); New York City, U.S.
- Occupation: Musician
- Instruments: Guitar; vocals
- Formerly of: The XYZ Affair

Alexander George Feder (born November 20, 1982), also known as Leonard Friend, is an American musician, singer-songwriter, and record producer.

Feder was the songwriter, singer, and guitarist of the XYZ Affair. After the demise of his previous band, Feder moved from Brooklyn to Los Angeles and started recording as Leonard Friend.

His first release was the Lynyrd Frynd EP, with lead single "Serious Music". Nylon called the latter "the smoothest-sounding debut we've heard in a while".

In 2013 he released a remix of Justin Timberlake's "Suit & Tie".

Until 2017, he toured with Spanish artist Enrique Iglesias. Subsequently, Feder spent four years touring internationally with American singer LP. He also played for artists such as Ellie Goulding, Miley Cyrus, and Natasha Bedingfield.

In 2024, Feder became the touring lead guitarist for a reformed Linkin Park, filling in for founding member Brad Delson, who remains a member of the band, but chose to step down from touring. He first performed with Linkin Park on September 5, and played on their From Zero World Tour (2024–2026).

After living in Los Angeles for several years, as of 2025, Feder resides in Mexico City.

== Discography ==
XYZ affair

- Good To Know (But Hard To Tell) - EP (2003)
- A Few More Published Studies - (2006)
- Trials - Digi EP (2008)

Leonard Friend/Alex Feder

- Lynyrd Frynd - EP (2013)
- LXLF - EP (2013)
- +1 - EP (2015)

Linkin Park

- Unshatter film soundtrack recorded in São Paulo – (2026)
