= From Zero =

2024 studio album by Linkin Park

- Standard edition cover

Studio album by Linkin Park
- Released: November 15, 2024
- Recorded: 2019–2024
- Studios: EastWest (Hollywood, California); The Stockroom (Los Angeles, California); Studio del Brittain (Studio City, California); Namouche (Lisbon, Portugal)
- Genres: Nu metal; alternative rock; alternative metal; pop rock; electronic rock; rap rock
- Length: 31:54
- Labels: Warner; Machine Shop
- Producer: Mike Shinoda

Linkin Park chronology
Papercuts (Singles Collection 2000–2023) (2024)	From Zero (2024)	Unshatter Film Soundtrack (Live in São Paulo) (2026)

Singles from From Zero
- 1. "The Emptiness Machine" Released: September 5, 2024; 2. "Heavy Is the Crown" Released: September 24, 2024; 3. "Over Each Other" Released: October 24, 2024; 4. "Two Faced" Released: November 13, 2024

From Zero (Deluxe Edition)
- Deluxe edition cover

Singles from From Zero (Deluxe Edition)
- 1. "Up From the Bottom" Released: March 27, 2025; 2. "Unshatter" Released: April 25, 2025

From Zero is the eighth studio album by American rock band Linkin Park. It was released on November 15, 2024, through Warner Records and Machine Shop, and is Linkin Park's first studio album since One More Light (2017). This is also their first album with vocalist Emily Armstrong and drummer Colin Brittain, following the death of vocalist Chester Bennington in 2017 and departure of drummer and band co-founder Rob Bourdon. The album's title has a double meaning; it is a reference to both the band's original name, Xero, and the band's new chapter with Armstrong and Brittain. The album marks the band's return to the nu metal, alternative metal, and rap rock genres, while incorporating some of the experimental sounds from their later records.

Four singles from the album were released ahead of the album's debut; "The Emptiness Machine", "Heavy Is the Crown", "Over Each Other", and "Two Faced". From Zero received generally favorable reviews from critics and was a commercial success, reaching number one in the charts of more than 10 different countries. The album was named album of the year by Revolver magazine and listed as the best rock album of 2024 by Loudwire. At the 68th Annual Grammy Awards it was nominated for Best Rock Album, while lead single "The Emptiness Machine" was nominated for Best Rock Performance.

A concert tour in support of the album, the From Zero World Tour, began in September 2024 and concluded in June 2026. A deluxe edition of the album was released on May 16, 2025, featuring live recordings and three new songs: "Up From the Bottom", "Unshatter", and "Let You Fade," the former two of which were released as singles.

== Background and promotion ==
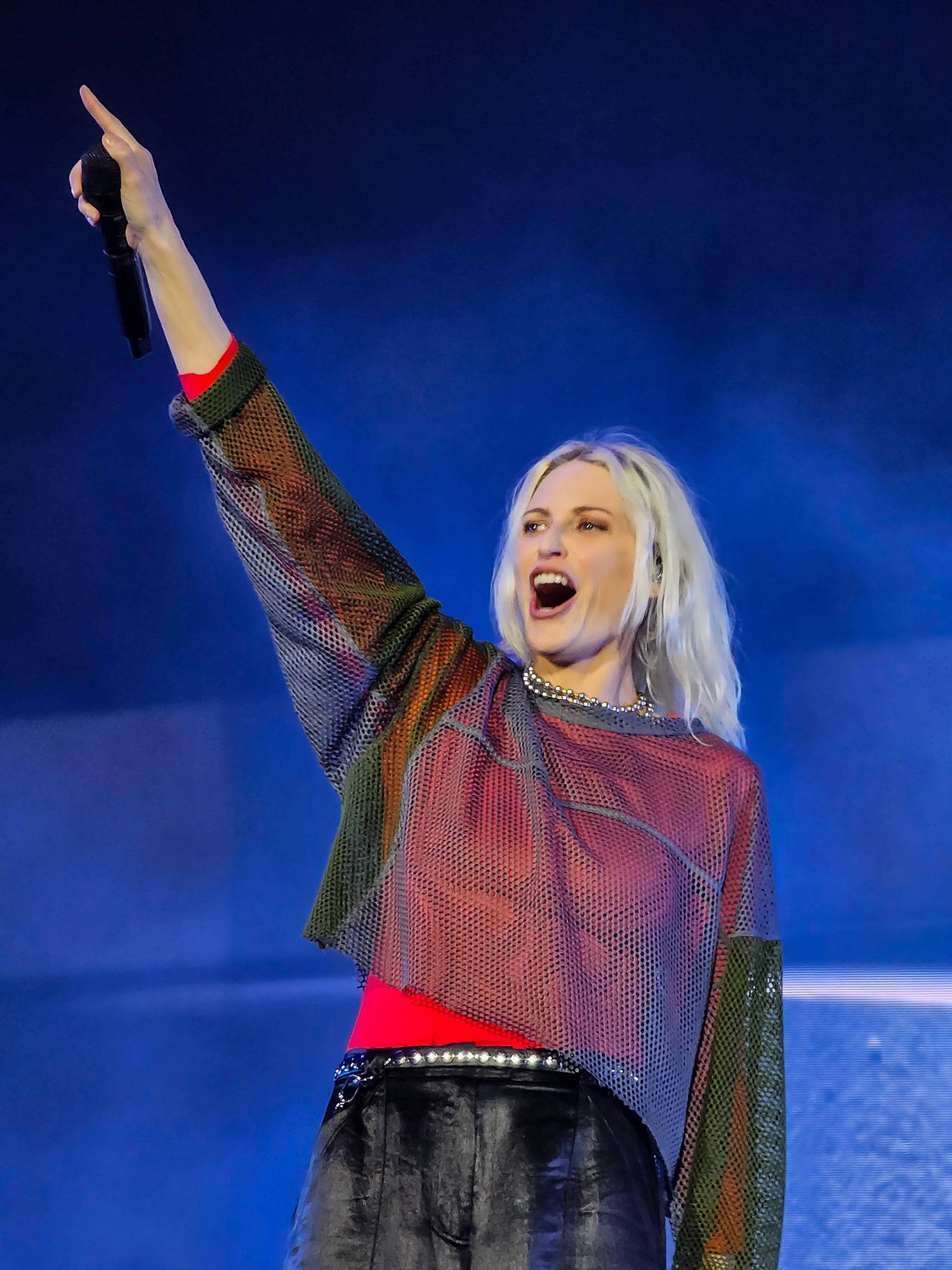
From Zero was Linkin Park's first album to feature Emily Armstrong (pictured 2024) as their lead vocalist following the death of Chester Bennington. The band first met Armstrong in 2019 and began making music with her.

On July 20, 2017, Linkin Park went on indefinite hiatus after long-time lead singer Chester Bennington died by suicide. Mike Shinoda communicated to the public on several occasions in the ensuing years that he intended for the band to continue, stating in January 2018, "I have every intention on continuing with LP, and the guys feel the same. We have a lot of rebuilding to do, and questions to answer, so it'll take time." In June of that year, Shinoda released his debut solo studio album, Post Traumatic, which was released under his own name rather than his Fort Minor moniker. Some tracks also detail his feelings after Bennington's death. In 2019, Shinoda, Joe Hahn, and Dave Farrell resumed working on new music together, without any public announcement. They were later joined by Brad Delson, although founding drummer Rob Bourdon chose not to participate. The band met Dead Sara vocalist Emily Armstrong in 2019 and began working on music with her shortly thereafter, along with various other musicians, including drummer Colin Brittain. On April 28, 2020, Farrell revealed the band was working on new music. Over the next three years, the band released 20th-anniversary reissues of their first two studio albums Hybrid Theory (2000) and Meteora (2003), with both containing previously unreleased material featuring Bennington's vocals. The band also released their first greatest hits album titled Papercuts on April 12, 2024, which contained one previously unreleased song with Bennington's vocals recorded during the One More Light (2017) sessions.

On March 30, 2024, in an interview with KCAL-FM, Orgy frontman Jay Gordon sparked rumors of a Linkin Park reunion, claiming he had heard that the band had recruited a new female singer but refused to elaborate further. The following month, Billboard followed up on his comments and reported that WME was taking offers for a potential Linkin Park reunion tour and headlining festival dates in 2025. The proposed lineup featured Shinoda, Delson, Farrell, and an unnamed female vocalist in place of Bennington. Later in August, the band launched a mysterious 100-hour countdown without any explanation. After the countdown reached zero, the band released a statement hinting at a major announcement, writing: "It's only a matter of time". An invite was sent to members of the band's fan club, Linkin Park Underground, revealing a five-hour event on September 5, 2024, in Los Angeles, California.

On September 5, Linkin Park announced From Zero after a live-streamed performance of several songs, including the album's lead single, "The Emptiness Machine". Simultaneously, the band confirmed Armstrong as the band's new co-lead singer, with Brittain taking over drums following Bourdon's departure. A six-date arena tour across four continents to support the album was also revealed. On September 7, 2024, lead guitarist Brad Delson announced that he would no longer tour with the band, with Alex Feder, who had already played the September 5 show in his place, assuming the role as Linkin Park's touring guitarist. Delson confirmed that he would continue to work with the band creatively, preferring behind-the-scenes work.

The album's title, From Zero, has a double meaning. It refers to the band's original name, Xero, and also references this new beginning for the band. The band performed a new song, "Heavy Is the Crown", during their show at the Barclays Arena in Hamburg, Germany, on September 22, 2024. It was released as the album's second single on September 24 and also served as the main theme for Riot Games' 2024 League of Legends World Championship; a reworked version was also included on the soundtrack for the second season of the television series Arcane for which Shinoda and Armstrong recorded new vocals. The album's third single, "Over Each Other", was released with an accompanying music video on October 24, 2024. The track "Casualty" received its live debut in Texas on November 8, ahead of the albums release.

On November 12, the entire standard edition of the album was played at simultaneous listening party events at independent record stores. The following day, the album's fourth single, "Two Faced", saw a surprise release along with an accompanying music video. When the band released the album, they introduced it with 17 differently formatted physical editions; including 11 vinyl LPs, three CDs, one CD box set, and two cassettes. On January 24, 2025, the band released an a cappella version of From Zero, followed by an instrumental version of the album on February 28, 2025, and then a deluxe edition on May 16, 2025, which contained three additional songs and five live tracks. Two of the songs, "Unshatter" and "Let You Fade", were recorded during the From Zero sessions, but were not finished by the time of the album's original release, and the third, "Up From the Bottom", was written and recorded in between the initial tour dates of From Zero.

== Composition ==
Musically, From Zero has been described as nu metal, alternative rock, alternative metal, pop rock, rap rock, and electronic rock. Rishi Shah of NME has considered the album "arguably rock's biggest comeback album in recent history" and "an intriguing mix of sensational, knockout stadium rock". Tom Morgan from Clash notes that the album "cribs from every era of the band".

== Touring ==
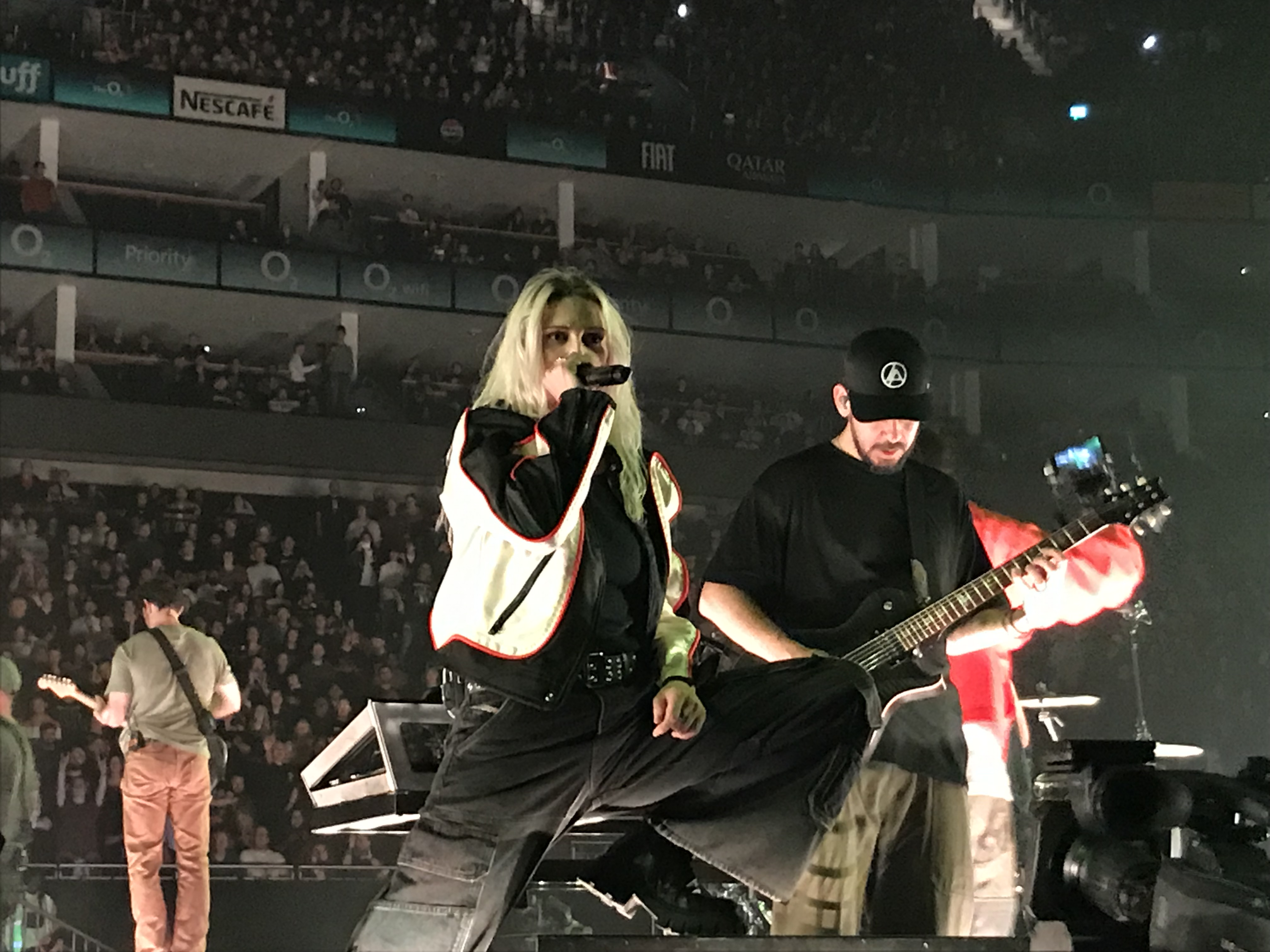
Linkin Park performing live at the O_{2} Arena in London, England in September 2024.

Throughout the back end of 2024, the band toured in the United States, Germany, the United Kingdom, France, South Korea, Colombia and Brazil. The From Zero World Tour began at the Kia Forum in Inglewood, California on September 11, 2024, six days after the live show at RED Studios, and concluded at the Allianz Parque in São Paulo, Brazil, on November 16, 2024. The initial 2024 tour became prominent for the band debuting their new singles "The Emptiness Machine", "Heavy Is the Crown", "Over Each Other" and album deep-cut "Casualty" for the first time. The band also performed two songs from their sixth studio album, The Hunting Party, live for the first time, "Keys to the Kingdom" and "All for Nothing", the latter with Helmet frontman Page Hamilton onstage.

On November 14, 2024, one day before the album's release, the band announced a huge worldwide 2025 stadium tour in promotion of the album. It began on January 31, at Estadio GNP Seguros in Mexico City, Mexico and was slated to culminate on November 15, 2025, in Porto Alegre, Brazil. In March 2025, several South American tour dates were cancelled for logistical reasons. The tour concluded at the Estádio Nacional Mané Garrincha in Brasília, Brazil on November 11, 2025. The tour also marked the first time the band performs at Wembley Stadium in London. The tour featured supporting acts from Queens of the Stone Age, Spiritbox, AFI, Pvris, Architects, Grandson, Jean Dawson and JPEGMafia, among others. The band's vocalist Mike Shinoda later revealed that they initially planned to do a co-headlining tour with fellow American rock band My Chemical Romance, though these plans fell through when My Chemical Romance already had other touring commitments booked for the year which clashed with their respective dates.

== Critical reception ==
Professional ratings
Aggregate scores
Source	Rating
AnyDecentMusic?	7.0/10
Metacritic	70/100
Review scores
Source	Rating
AllMusic	3/5 stars
Blabbermouth.net	8.5/10
Clash	5/10
The Guardian	4/5 stars
The Independent	4/5 stars
Kerrang!	4/5
Metal Hammer	4/5 stars
Metal Injection	8.5/10
MusicOMH	4/5 stars
NME	3/5 stars

From Zero received generally positive reviews from critics upon its release. According to the review aggregator Metacritic, From Zero received "generally favorable reviews" based on a weighted average score of 70 out of 100 from 10 critic scores. Neil Z. Yeung of AllMusic wrote, "From Zero is a decent effort that contains all the band's hallmarks, even if it's not the exact same Linkin Park that is known and loved." Anne Erickson at Blabbermouth.net wrote, "There is no replacing Bennington and the sound that Linkin Park had when he was alive. From Zero's most successful parts are the songs that don't sound like classic Linkin Park," while adding that the album has a lot of those moments, and stating it "should bring new fans to the table while still appealing to longtime fans." Clash was less positive by describing the album as "An opinion-splitting return with soaring highs and disappointing lows." Alexis Petridis of The Guardian stated, "They were always unafraid to take sonic risks, and another sonic risk is exactly what their comeback constitutes – one that has handsomely paid off." Helen Brown, writing for The Independent felt that there is "Nothing revolutionary about From Zero...but [it certainly is] a re-energised return to business for a band that has been sorely missed."

Luke Morton of Kerrang! wrote, "Sure, not every song is something to write home about, and not everyone is going to be on board with a new singer, but as a piece of work, it's a clear reminder of why Linkin Park reached the heights they did and continue to influence multiple generations of artists." Jordan Blum of Metal Injection felt that "the record is extremely successful at recapturing the group's magic with just enough newness to keep it intriguing." Merlin Alderslade writing for Metal Hammer called it "an earnest tribute to their own legacy." Donovan Livesey of MusicOMH wrote, "Compact and intense, the band's first album since the death of Chester Bennington is a powerful tribute to their legacy." Rishi Shah of NME called it one of "rock's biggest comeback album in recent history [and] an intriguing mix of sensational, knockout stadium rock and some perplexingly tired songwriting." James Hall of The Daily Telegraph called it "a solid and uncompromising piece of work."

=== Accolades ===
List of awards and nominations
Year	Organization	Category	Result	Ref.
2025	Heavy Music Awards	Best Album	Nominated	
2025	Heavy Music Awards	Best Album Artwork	Nominated	
2025	iHeartRadio Music Awards	Rock Album of the Year	Won	
2025	Webby Awards	Top Events & Live streams (Video): Social	Won	
2026	Grammy Awards	Best Rock Album	Nominated	

=== Year-end lists ===
From Zero on select year-end lists
Publisher	Listicle	Rank	Ref.
Alternative Press	50 best albums of 2024	Placed	
Kerrang!	The 50 best albums of 2024	7	
Loudwire	The 11 Best Rock Albums of 2024	1	
Loudwire	The Best Hard Rock Album of Each Year Since 1970	Placed	
Panorama	The 40 Best International Albums of 2024	14	
Radio X	The 25 Best Albums of 2024	17	
Revolver	2024’s Album of the Year	1	
Rock Sound	Top 24 Albums of 2024	4	
Rolling Stone Brasil	The 10 Best International Albums of 2024	5	

== Commercial performance ==
The album debuted at number one in 14 different countries, including Australia, Austria, Belgium, Canada, France, Germany, Hungary, Italy, Netherlands, New Zealand, Portugal, Scotland, Switzerland and the United Kingdom.

From Zero debuted atop the UK Albums Chart, being the band's first number one in the country since Living Things (2012), selling 37,826 total units in its first week. Of the total sales, the album sold 23,149 physical copies, 4,474 digital downloads and 10,203 streaming album-equivalent units. The album was denied a clean sweep of number one's in the UK, only being denied the top spot on the UK Albums Streaming Chart by Sabrina Carpenter's Short n' Sweet. It spent eight consecutive weeks at the summit of the UK Rock & Metal Albums Chart. The album was certified Silver by the British Phonographic Industry for 60,000 units in December 2024 and Gold for 100,000 units in April 2025. Upon the release of the deluxe edition, the album re-entered the UK Albums Chart at number 23, selling 4,293 copies.

In Australia, the album debuted atop the ARIA Albums Chart, becoming the band’s fourth studio album to achieve it and their first since A Thousand Suns (2010).

In Germany, the album also debuted at number one and was certified Gold by the BVMI in its first week for over 75,000 copies sold, being the second largest debut in the country of the year, only behind Taylor Swift's The Tortured Poets Department. It was also streamed over 23 million times, a record for a band in the country. The band also made history, becoming the first ever band in the chart's history to secure three of the top five spots on the German Singles Chart with "The Emptiness Machine" (1), "Heavy Is the Crown" (3), and "Two Faced" (5).

In the United States, From Zero debuted at number two on the Billboard 200 with 97,000 album-equivalent units, including 72,000 pure sales and 32.18 million streams, only being denied the top spot by Ateez's Golden Hour: Part.2 which sold 184,000 units. The album dominated the rock charts and debuted atop the Top Rock Albums, Top Alternative Albums, and Top Hard Rock Albums charts. The band also achieved a historical feat of simultaneously occupying the entire top ten with every eligible song from the album on the Hot Hard Rock Songs chart. By May 2025, the album had sold 383,000 album-equivalent units in the United States. Upon the release of the deluxe edition, the album re-entered the Billboard 200 at number 71, selling 14,000 album-equivalent units, including 7,500 physical copies.

== Track listing ==
All tracks are written by Linkin Park (Emily Armstrong, Colin Brittain, Brad Delson, Dave Farrell, Joe Hahn, Mike Shinoda), alongside additional writers as noted.

From Zero track listing
No.	Title	Writer(s)	Length
1.	"From Zero (Intro)"		0:22
2.	"The Emptiness Machine"		3:10
3.	"Cut the Bridge"	Bea Miller; Nick Long	3:48
4.	"Heavy Is the Crown"	Mike Elizondo	2:47
5.	"Over Each Other"	Jon Green; Matias Mora	2:50
6.	"Casualty"		2:20
7.	"Overflow"	Elizondo; Jaten Dimsdale; Jake Torrey	3:31
8.	"Two Faced"		3:03
9.	"Stained"	Cal Shapiro	3:05
10.	"IGYEIH" ( (Note: "IGYEIH" is an acronym for "I Give You Everything I Have".))	Long	3:29
11.	"Good Things Go"	Torrey	3:29
Total length:			31:54

Deluxe edition (Note: "This is the track listing for the physical edition, the digital edition excludes the live tracks".)
No.	Title	Writer(s)	Length
12.	"Up From the Bottom"		3:03
13.	"Unshatter"	Torrey	3:16
14.	"Let You Fade"	Elijah Noll	3:28
15.	"The Emptiness Machine" (live in Burbank, California on September 5, 2024)		3:18
16.	"Heavy Is the Crown" (live in London, England on September 24, 2024)	Elizondo	3:26
17.	"Over Each Other" (live in Paris, France on November 3, 2024)	Green; Mora	2:53
18.	"Casualty" (live in Bogotá, Colombia on November 11, 2024)		2:56
19.	"Two Faced" (live in São Paulo, Brazil on November 15, 2024)		3:58
Total length:			54:29

Digital expanded edition
No.	Title	Length
12.	"The Emptiness Machine" (live)	3:16
13.	"Heavy Is the Crown" (live)	3:25
14.	"Over Each Other" (live)	2:52
Total length:		41:27

From Zero: A Capellas track listing
No.	Title	Length
1.	"From Zero (Intro) – A Capella"	0:22
2.	"The Emptiness Machine – A Capella"	3:05
3.	"Cut the Bridge – A Capella"	3:21
4.	"Heavy Is the Crown – A Capella"	2:18
5.	"Over Each Other – A Capella"	2:44
6.	"Casualty – A Capella"	2:19
7.	"Overflow – A Capella"	3:24
8.	"Two Faced – A Capella"	2:34
9.	"Stained – A Capella"	2:57
10.	"IGYEIH – A Capella"	3:24
11.	"Good Things Go – A Capella"	3:13
Total length:		29:45

From Zero: A Capellas + Instrumentals track listing
No.	Title	Length
12.	"The Emptiness Machine – Instrumental"	3:10
13.	"Cut the Bridge – Instrumental"	3:48
14.	"Heavy Is the Crown – Instrumental"	2:47
15.	"Over Each Other – Instrumental"	2:43
16.	"Casualty – Instrumental"	2:20
17.	"Overflow – Instrumental"	3:27
18.	"Two Faced – Instrumental"	2:59
19.	"Stained – Instrumental"	3:05
20.	"IGYEIH – Instrumental"	3:29
21.	"Good Things Go – Instrumental"	3:25
Total length:		31:13

== Personnel ==
Credits adapted from the album's liner notes and Tidal.

Linkin Park

- Emily Armstrong – vocals
- Colin Brittain – drums (tracks 2–11); co-production (all tracks)
- Brad Delson – guitar (tracks 2–11); co-production (all tracks)
- Dave "Phoenix" Farrell – bass (tracks 2–11)
- Joe Hahn – programming (tracks 2–11); creative direction
- Mike Shinoda – vocals, production, engineering (all tracks); mixing (track 1), creative direction

Production

- Neal Avron – mixing (tracks 2, 5, 7, 9, 11)
- Rich Costey – mixing (tracks 3, 4, 6, 8, 10)
- Mike Elizondo – additional production (tracks 4, 7)
- Jeff Citron – mixing assistance (tracks 3, 4, 6, 8, 10)
- Emerson Mancini – mastering (Demifugue Mastering, Los Angeles, California)
- Ethan Mates – engineering
- Matias Mora – additional production (track 5)
- Scott Skrzynski – mixing assistance (tracks 2, 5, 7, 9, 11)

Visuals

- Josh Foster – album artwork
- Frank Maddocks – creative direction, art direction, design
- James Minchin III – band photography
- Brian Ziff – album artwork photography

Deluxe edition

- Alex Feder – guitars (live tracks)
- Neal Avron – mixing
- Bo Bodnar – digital editing
- Colin Brittain – co-production
- Jeff Citron – mixing assistance
- Brad Delson – co-production
- Jim Ebdon – live recordings
- Emerson Mancini – mastering (Demifugue Mastering, Los Angeles, California)
- Ethan Mates – engineering, mixing
- Mike Shinoda – production, engineering
- Scott Skrzynski – mixing assistance

== Charts ==
=== Weekly charts ===
Weekly chart performance for From Zero
Chart (2024–25)	Peak position
Argentine Albums (CAPIF)	3
Australian Albums (ARIA)	1
Austrian Albums (Ö3 Austria)	1
Belgian Albums (Ultratop Flanders)	1
Belgian Albums (Ultratop Wallonia)	1
Canadian Albums (Billboard)	1
Croatian International Albums (HDU)	1
Czech Albums (ČNS IFPI)	2
Danish Albums (Hitlisten)	2
Dutch Albums (Album Top 100)	1
Finnish Albums (Suomen virallinen lista)	2
French Albums (SNEP)	1
French Rock & Metal Albums (SNEP)	1
German Albums (Offizielle Top 100)	1
German Rock & Metal Albums (Offizielle Top 100)	1
Greek Albums (IFPI)	8
Hungarian Albums (MAHASZ)	1
Icelandic Albums (Tónlistinn)	14
Irish Albums (IRMA)	2
Italian Albums (FIMI)	1
Japanese Albums (Oricon)	11
Japanese Combined Albums (Oricon)	9
Japanese Rock Albums (Oricon)	2
Japanese Hot Albums (Billboard)	5
Lithuanian Albums (AGATA)	4
New Zealand Albums (RMNZ)	1
Norwegian Albums (VG-lista)	2
Norwegian Rock Albums (IFPI Norge)	17
Polish Albums (ZPAV)	2
Polish Digital Albums (ZPAV)	1
Portuguese Albums (AFP)	1
Scottish Albums (Official Charts)	1
Slovak Albums (ČNS IFPI)	2
Spanish Albums (Promusicae)	2
Swedish Albums (Sverigetopplistan)	3
Swiss Albums (Schweizer Hitparade)	1
UK Albums (Official Charts)	1
UK Rock & Metal Albums (Official Charts)	1
US Billboard 200	2
US Top Rock Albums (Billboard)	1

=== Monthly charts ===
Monthly chart performance for From Zero
Chart (2024)	Peak position
Czech Albums (ČNS IFPI)	3
Slovak Albums (ČNS IFPI)	3
Japanese Albums (Oricon)	29
Japanese Rock Albums (Oricon)	3

=== Year-end charts ===
Year-end chart performance for From Zero
Chart (2024)	Position
Austrian Albums (Ö3 Austria)	3
Belgian Albums (Ultratop Flanders)	15
Belgian Albums (Ultratop Wallonia)	21
Croatian International Albums (HDU)	4
Dutch Albums (Album Top 100)	75
French Albums (SNEP)	35
German Albums (Offizielle Top 100)	3
Hungarian Albums (MAHASZ)	28
Italian Albums (FIMI)	94
Polish Albums (ZPAV)	40
Portuguese Albums (AFP)	15
Swiss Albums (Schweizer Hitparade)	5
UK CD Albums (OCC)	21
UK Vinyl Albums (OCC)	26

Chart (2025)	Position
Austrian Albums (Ö3 Austria)	3
Belgian Albums (Ultratop Flanders)	11
Belgian Albums (Ultratop Wallonia)	19
Canadian Albums (Billboard)	97
Croatian International Albums (HDU)	14
Czech Republic Albums (ČNS IFPI)	9
Dutch Albums (Album Top 100)	34
French Albums (SNEP)	27
German Albums (Offizielle Top 100)	2
Hungarian Albums (MAHASZ)	18
Italian Albums (FIMI)	78
Japanese Download Albums (Billboard)	39
New Zealand Albums (RMNZ)	46
Polish Albums (ZPAV)	37
Swedish Albums (Sverigetopplistan)	91
Swiss Albums (Schweizer Hitparade)	7
US Top Album Sales (Billboard)	42
US Top Current Album Sales (Billboard)	29
US Top Rock Albums (Billboard)	26
US Top Hard Rock Albums (Billboard)	21

== Certifications ==
Certifications and sales for From Zero
Region	Certification	Certified units/sales
Austria (IFPI Austria)	Platinum	15,000^{‡}
Brazil (Pro-Música Brasil)	3× Platinum	120,000^{‡}
Canada (Music Canada)	Gold	40,000^{‡}
Denmark (IFPI Danmark)	Gold	10,000^{‡}
France (SNEP)	2× Platinum	200,000^{‡}
Germany (BVMI)	Platinum	150,000^{‡}
Italy (FIMI)	Platinum	50,000^{‡}
Netherlands (NVPI)	Gold	18,600^{‡}
New Zealand (RMNZ)	Gold	7,500^{‡}
Portugal (AFP)	Platinum	7,000^{‡}
Spain (Promusicae)	Gold	20,000^{‡}
Switzerland (IFPI Switzerland)	Gold	10,000^{‡}
United Kingdom (BPI)	Gold	100,000^{‡}
^{‡} Sales+streaming figures based on certification alone.
