= Colin Brittain =

American songwriter & producer (born 1986)

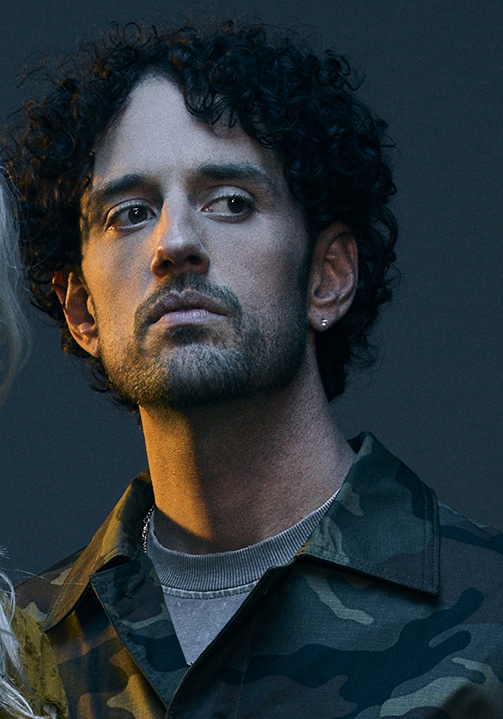
- Brittain with Linkin Park in 2024

Background information
- Born: Colin Cunningham; December 29, 1986 (age 39); Pensacola, Florida, U.S.
- Origin: Nashville, Tennessee, U.S.
- Genres: Alternative rock; pop rock; alternative metal
- Occupations: Songwriter; producer; musician
- Instruments: Drums; guitar
- Years active: 2011–present
- Member of: Linkin Park
- Formerly of: Oh No Fiasco

Colin Cunningham (born December 29, 1986) known professionally as Colin "Doc" Brittain, is an American songwriter, producer, and musician signed to Warner Chappell Music. In 2024, he joined Linkin Park as the band's drummer, replacing Rob Bourdon who left the band in 2017.

Prior to joining Linkin Park, he wrote and produced for acts such as Papa Roach, Story of the Year, 311, A Day to Remember, Dashboard Confessional, 5 Seconds of Summer, From Ashes to New, and One Ok Rock.

== Career ==
Brittain began his career playing drums in the band Oh No Fiasco, starting in 2011. Oh No Fiasco was signed to Five Seven Music where they released their debut EP, No One's Gotta Know in 2013. In the same year they were supposed to be releasing a thirteen-track album, but it was never released. The band broke up the same year, playing their last show on March 10, 2013. Afterwards, Brittain continued to work as a producer.

After working with Mike Shinoda on projects with other artists, in 2023, he joined American rock band Linkin Park as their drummer. He succeeded original drummer Rob Bourdon, who had declined to participate in the band's developing reunion. Brittain was one of two new members alongside vocalist Emily Armstrong in the band's new lineup revealed to the public on September 5, 2024.

Brittain drummed on Linkin Park's comeback album From Zero, which he co-wrote and co-produced, and the From Zero World Tour (2024 through 2026).

== Discography ==
| Year | Artist | Song | Album | Label | Credits |
|---|---|---|---|---|---|
| 2014 | Dark Waves | "Outsider" | Dark Waves | Five Seven Music | Producer, co-writer, mixer |
| 2014 | 5 Seconds of Summer | "Never Be", ''Tomorrow Never Dies'' | 5 Seconds of Summer | Capitol Records | Additional producer, engineer, mixer |
| 2014 | Beautiful Bodies | | Battles | Epitaph Records | Co-writer, additional production, engineer, mixer |
| 2015 | Ghost Town | "Evolution" | Evolution | Fueled By Ramen | Producer, songwriter |
| 2015 | One OK Rock | "Take me to the top", "Cry Out", "Good Goodbye" | 35XXXV | A-Sketch | Producer, co-writer, mixer |
| 2015 | Avicii | "The Nights" | The Days / Nights EP | Island Records | Guitar |
| 2016 | Aimer | ''Insane dream'', ''Closer'', ''Falling Alone'' | daydream | SME Records | Arranger |
| 2016 | Hello Sleepwalkers | "Eyes to the Skies" | Planless Perfection | A-Sketch | Producer, co-writer, co-composer |
| 2017 | League of Legends | "Legends Never Die" | | Riot Games | Vocal producer |
| 2017 | One Ok Rock | "Ambitions-Introduction-", "Bombs away", "We are", "20/20", "Jaded", "Hard To Love", "I was King", "Listen", "Bon Voyage", "Start Again", "Take what you want" | Ambitions | A-Sketch, Fueled by Ramen | Producer |
| 2017 | Logan Henderson | "Sleepwalker", "Bite My Tongue", "Speak of the Devil" | Echoes of Departure and the Endless Street of Dreams - Pt. 1 | Herø | Composer, writer, producer |
| 2017 | Papa Roach | "Crooked Teeth", "My Medication", "Periscope", "Help", "Sunrise Trailer Park", "Traumatic", "None of the Above" | Crooked Teeth | Eleven Seven Music | Composer, producer, mixer |
| 2017 | All Time Low | "Dirty Laundry", "Nice2KnoU", "Afterglow", "Good Times" | Last Young Renegade | Fueled by Ramen | Composer, producer, mixer |
| 2018 | Hands Like Houses | | Anon. | Hopeless Records | Composer, writer, producer |
| 2018 | All Time Low | "Everything Is Fine", "Birthday" | singles | Fueled by Ramen | Composer, producer, mixer |
| 2018 | Basement | | Beside Myself | Fueled By Ramen, Run For Cover | Producer, additional musician |
| 2018 | From Ashes to New | "Nowhere to Run" | The Future | Better Noise Records | Composer, producer, mixer |
| 2018 | Keith Wallen | "Four Letter Words", "Summer Sunday" | Non-album singles | Independent | Producer |
| 2019 | Papa Roach | "The Ending", "Renegade Music", "Not the Only One", "Who Do You Trust?", "Elevate", "Come Around", "Feel Like Home", "Problems", "I Suffer Well", "Maniac", "Better Than Life" | Who Do You Trust? | Eleven Seven Music | Composer, writer, producer, mixer |
| 2019 | One Ok Rock | "Worst In Me" | Eye of the Storm | A-Sketch | Composer, producer, mixer |
| 2019 | Dreamers | "Vampire in the Sun" | Launch, Fly, Land | Fairfax Recordings | Composer, producer, mixer |
| 2019 | A Day to Remember | | You're Welcome | Fueled by Ramen | Composer, producer, mixer |
| 2021 | Keith Wallen | "Blue" | This World or the Next | BMG | Co-writer |
| 2022 | One Ok Rock | "Let Me Let You Go" | Luxury Disease | Fueled by Ramen | Composer, producer,co-writer |
| 2022 | 5 Seconds of Summer | "You Don't Go To Parties", "Tears!", | 5SOS5 | BMG | Composer, producer, mixer, writer |
| Five New Old | "Happy Sad", "My New Me" | Departure : My New Me | Warner Music Japan | Producer | |
| 2023 | Story of the Year | | Tear Me to Pieces | SharpTone Records | Producer, co-writer |
| 2024 | 311 | "You're Gonna Get It", "Need Somebody", "Mountain Top" | Full Bloom | BMG | Producer, co-writer |
| 2024 | Linkin Park | All tracks | From Zero | Warner | Drums, co-producer |
| 2025 | Linkin Park | All tracks | From Zero (Deluxe Edition) | Warner | Drums, co-producer |
| 2025 | SixTones | "We Are One" | Gold | SME Japan | Composer, producer |
| 2025 | A Day to Remember | "Miracle" | Big Ole Album Vol. 1 | Fueled By Ramen | Co-producer |
| 2025 | Jon Bellion | "Dont Shoot" | Father Figure | Beautiful Mind | Co-producer |
| 2026 | Story of the Year | All tracks | A.R.S.O.N. | SharpTone | Producer, co-writer |
