= Dave Farrell =

American bassist

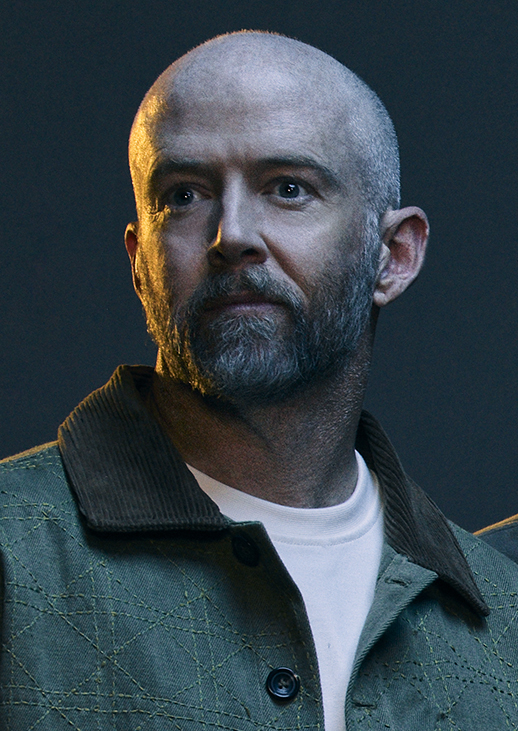
- Farrell in 2024

Background information
- Also known as: Phoenix
- Born: David Michael Farrell; February 8, 1977 (age 49); Plymouth, Massachusetts, U.S.
- Genres: Alternative rock; nu metal; electronic rock; alternative metal; ska punk (early)
- Occupation: Musician
- Instrument: Bass guitar
- Years active: 1995–present
- Member of: Linkin Park
- Formerly of: Tasty Snax
- Website: linkinpark.com

David Michael Farrell (born February 8, 1977), also known by his stage name Phoenix, is an American musician, best known as the bassist of the rock band Linkin Park. He was also a member of Tasty Snax, a ska punk band.

== Early life ==
Farrell was born in Plymouth, Massachusetts but later moved to Mission Viejo, California at the age of five. He was taught how to play guitar by his mother when he was in high school. He also played the violin in high school. Farrell attended UCLA, where he was roommates with future bandmate Brad Delson. He graduated from UCLA with a degree in philosophy.

== Career ==
=== Tasty Snax ===
While attending high school, Farrell joined a Christian ska punk band named Tasty Snax, who would later rename themselves to The Snax. Phoenix transitioned from the electric guitar to bass to accommodate The Snax. The band included Farrell's longtime college friend Mark Fiore, who was also associated in making various video albums for Linkin Park. The band recorded two studio albums and one compilation album, signed to Screaming Giant Records. Farrell left the band in 2000.

=== Linkin Park ===
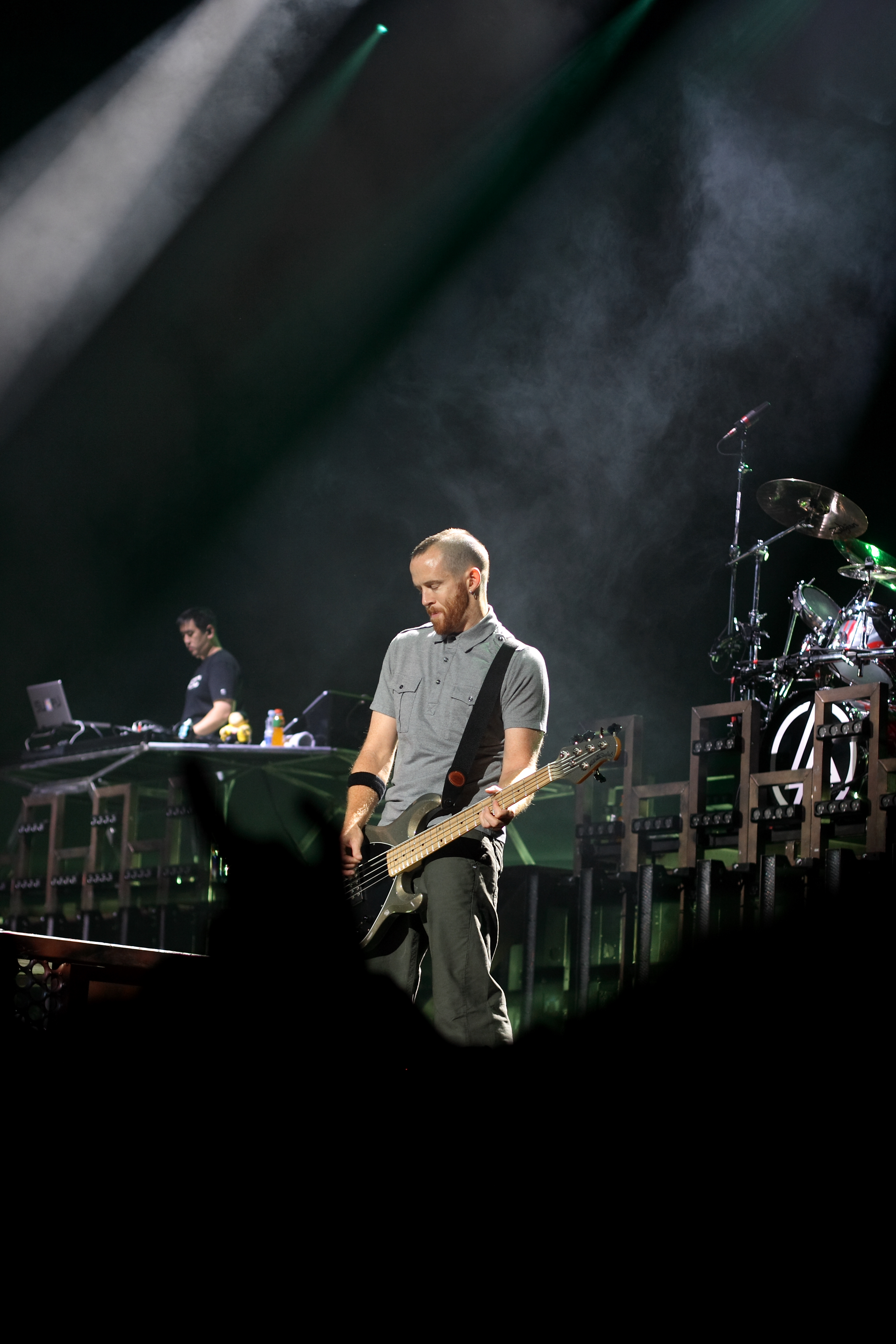
Farrell playing with Linkin Park at The Globe Arena in Stockholm

Farrell joined Xero, the earliest incarnation of Linkin Park, after meeting Delson at UCLA. He contributed to the band's self-titled demo tape in 1997, but left the project to tour with Tasty Snax. Farrell's void was temporally filled by Delson, Ian Hornbeck and Scott Koziol, who all contributed to Hybrid Theory, Linkin Park's debut album. Farrell returned to Linkin Park in 2000 after a year-long absence. He served as the band's bassist for six of the band's seven studio albums. On the 2002 Reanimation song "Krwlng", the remixed version of "Crawling", Farrell played the violin and cello parts. Along with Delson and Rob Bourdon, he also helped manage the band's business operations.

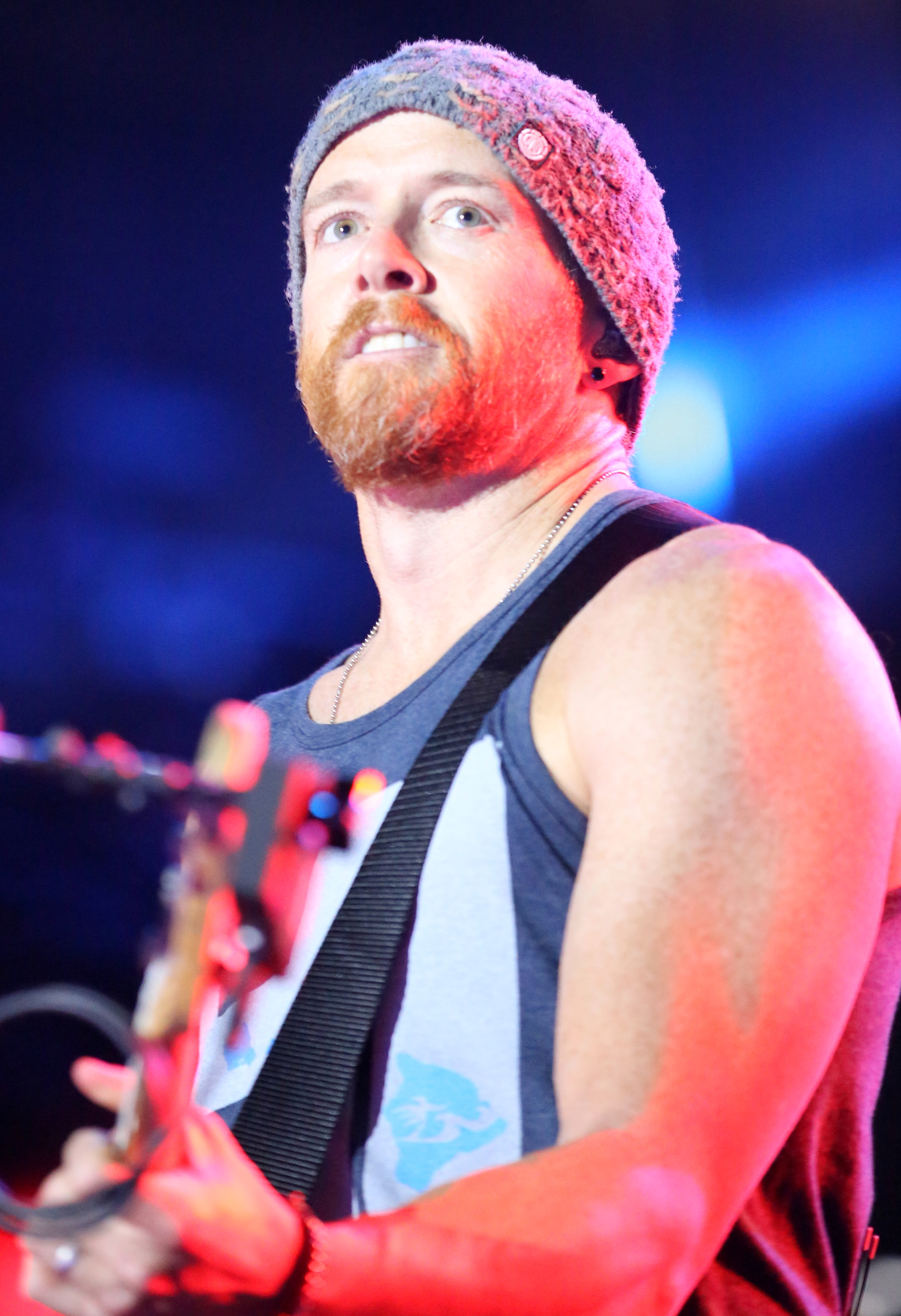
Farrell performing with Linkin Park in 2014

Linkin Park went on a hiatus after Chester Bennington died in 2017; Farrell chose not to speak at Bennington's memorial service because he said he was unable to fully express his feelings with words. He and Linkin Park returned after a seven-year hiatus to announce a new album, From Zero, and tour in 2024.

== Personal life ==
In 2008, Farrell stated that his political stances are "all over the place", agreeing with "certain Democratic views" and "a lot of other Republican views". Farrell is an avid golfer. He is also an association football fan and supports LA Galaxy, having previously been a season ticket holder. He has a podcast with his best friend and professional golfer, Brendan Steele, and Mark Fiore, Linkin Park's videographer and video editor.

== Discography ==
=== With Linkin Park ===
- Hybrid Theory (2000) (songwriting only)
- Reanimation (2002)
- Meteora (2003)
- Minutes to Midnight (2007)
- A Thousand Suns (2010)
- Living Things (2012)
- The Hunting Party (2014)
- One More Light (2017)
- From Zero (2024)

=== With Tasty Snax ===
- Run Joseph Run (1998)
- Snax (2000)
