= Dead Sara (album) =

Studio album by Dead Sara
- Released: April 10, 2012
- Genre: Hard rock, alternative rock
- Length: 42:36
- Label: Pocket Kid
- Producer: Noah Shain

Dead Sara chronology
The Airport Sessions (2008)	Dead Sara (2012)	Pleasure to Meet You (2015)

Singles from Dead Sara
- 1. "Sorry for It All" Released: 2011; 2. "Weatherman" Released: 2012; 3. "We Are What You Say" Released: 2012; 4. "Lemon Scent" Released: 2013

Dead Sara is the debut album by American rock band Dead Sara. It was released on April 10, 2012, by the band's own Pocket Kid Records and produced by Noah Shain. The album was critically acclaimed and reached number 16 on Billboard's Heatseekers Albums chart. Its single "Weatherman" reached number 30 on the Mainstream Rock chart, 31 on the Hot Rock Songs chart and 35 on the Alternative Songs chart.

== Background ==
"Weatherman" is the first song the current line-up of Dead Sara created, when Siouxsie Medley came up with the guitar riff in a rehearsal and Chris Null wrote the verses via a bassline.

"Sorry for It All" was previously released on the 2008 EP The Airport Sessions.

== Promotion ==
On June 7, 2012, Dead Sara performed "Weatherman" and "Sorry for It All" on Jimmy Kimmel Live!.

The band toured extensively in support of the record, including partaking in the 2012 Vans Warped Tour before having to pull out after Medley fractured her ribs. They opened for The Used, Chevelle, Bush in 2012 and for Muse in 2013.

A music video for "Lemon Scent" was released in March 2013. Loudwire ranked it number 5 on their list of the 10 Best Rock Videos of the year.

== Reception ==
Professional ratings
Review scores
Source	Rating
AllMusic	3.5/5 stars
Sputnikmusic	4/5 stars

Loudwire named Dead Sara number 3 on their list of the 10 Best Rock Albums of 2012 and "Weatherman" the best rock song of the year. Commenting on "Dear Love" for Loudwire, Liz Ramanand wrote that "Armstrong's vocal layers can go from giving you a warm hug to punching you in the face, and the pitch of her voice takes you on a rollercoaster ride you won't soon forget."

Steve Baltin of Rolling Stone wrote that by "Blending blues, hard rock and punk into a whirling energy, the album is a vehicle for both the band and Armstrong's diverse tastes."

Sputnikmusic's Irving Tan completed his review with "Dead Sara have created a record that people will be talking about for years to come."

== Track listing ==
All lyrics are written by Emily Armstrong; all music is composed by Dead Sara, except "Sorry for It All", written by Emily Armstrong and Siouxsie Medley.

No.	Title	Length
1.	"Whispers & Ashes"	3:51
2.	"We Are What You Say"	3:04
3.	"Weatherman"	4:21
4.	"Dear Love"	4:17
5.	"Monumental Holiday"	2:40
6.	"I Said You Were Lucky"	3:55
7.	"Face to Face"	4:30
8.	"Test on My Patience"	3:10
9.	"Timed Blues"	3:38
10.	"Lemon Scent"	4:22
11.	"Sorry for It All"	4:48
Total length:		42:36

== Personnel ==
Dead Sara

- Emily Armstrong – lead vocals, guitars
- Sean Friday – drums
- Siouxsie Medley – guitars
- Chris Null – bass

Production

- Noah Shain – producer, engineer, mixing
- Manuel Calderon – assistant engineer
- Marco Ramirez – mastering
