= Satellite Mode =

Electro-rock band

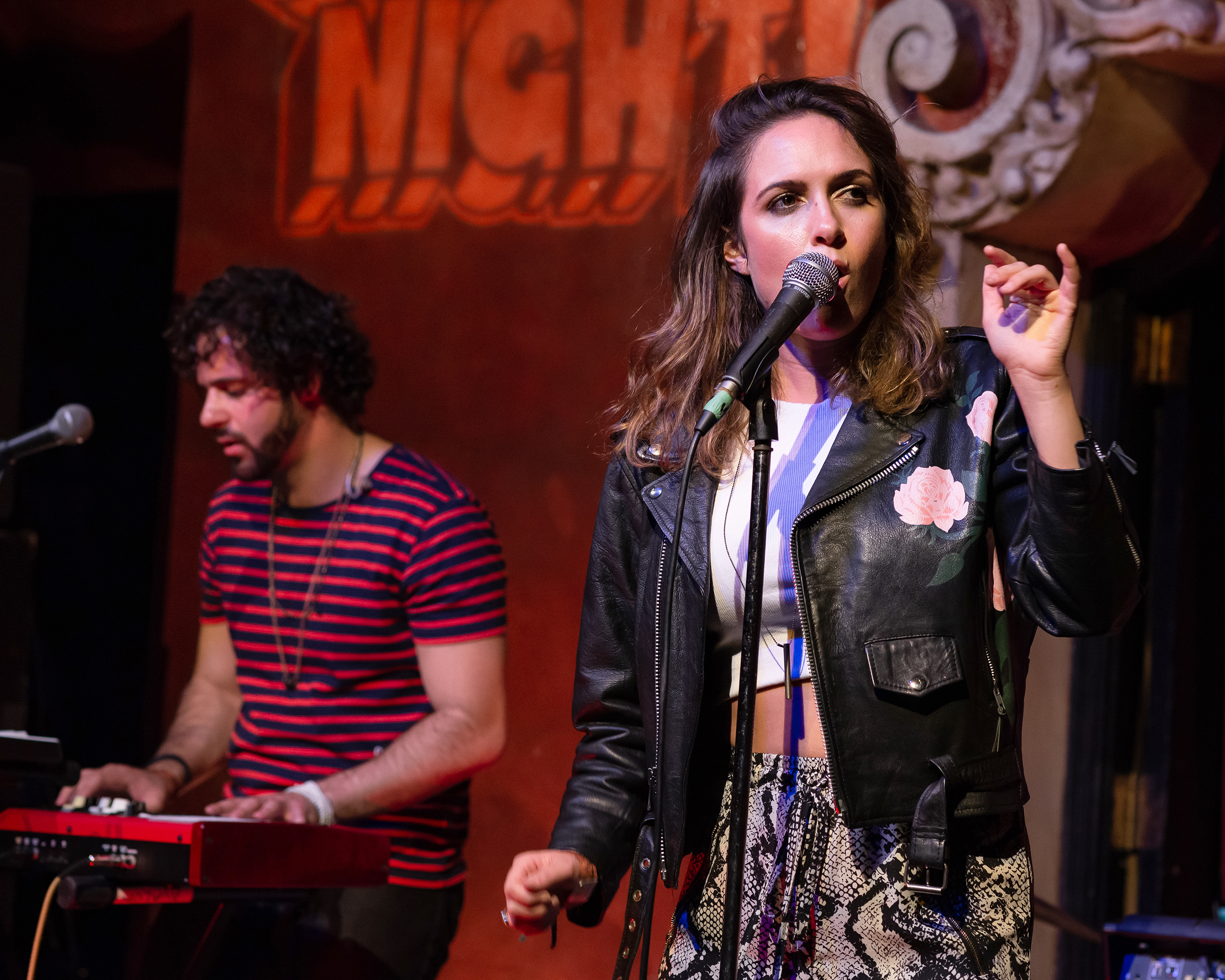

Background information
- Origin: New York, NY
- Genres: Electro-rock; Synthpop; Indie; Alternative
- Years active: 2015 - present
- Members: Jessica Carvo; Alex Marko
- Website: https://www.satellitemode.com/

Satellite Mode is an electro-rock duo made up of Jessica Carvo and Alex Marko. Based out of New York City, Satellite Mode has been an active member of the city's music scene since the band's inception in November 2015.

== History ==
Jessica Carvo and Alex Marko created Satellite Mode in November 2015. Starting out recording in a bedroom studio, the duo began gaining notoriety with the release of "Wild Excuses". This release led Satellite Mode to the #5 playlist spot on Spotify's US Top 50 Viral Songs, as well as a featured piece in NOISEY. The band also earned spots on both the New Music Friday and Weekly Buzz playlists.

In 2018, Satellite Mode released singles "Gave It All" and "Terrified". "Gave It All", released June 1, 2018, is a commentary on the repeal of DACA. "Terrified" was the follow-up single, touching on themes of love and fear. "Terrified" was co-written with S. Holden Jaffe, a musician, writer and producer. In addition, the band released "Gave It All 2.0" with artist and activist Xiutezcatl.

Singles "Kissing in Photographs" and "Sepia" were both released in 2019. "Kissing in Photographs" takes inspiration from afro-disco style grooves, and "Sepia" features strong synthesizer loops typical of a Satellite Mode song. "Kissing in Photographs" was co-written with Coyle Girelli, an English composer, producer, singer, and songwriter.

Robots vs. Party Girls was released on July 17, 2020. This EP was produced by Sam Cohen, a musician and producer who has worked with artists such as Danger Mouse, Beck, Norah Jones, and Sharon Van Etten. The EP featured four new tracks, and was released under AntiFragile Music. "Click Now", one track off the EP, explores the role of technology now as well as in the future. The track "Your Lungs" was co-written with S. Holden Jaffe, whom Satellite Mode had previously written with.

"Your Lungs", as well as covers of Modest Mouse's "Float On" and R.E.M.'s "Nightswimming" were offered by the band as a free download to any fan who donated to the NAACP.

The band's latest release "Pony Express" was self-released on March 4, 2021, and features two covers.

Throughout their career thus far, Satellite mode has racked up over 20 million cumulative plays across multiple streaming platforms. In addition, the duo has had the chance to perform alongside many other musicians, including Guster, The Band Perry, Shoffy, Des Rocs, Lauv, Great Good Fine OK, Skott, Del Water Gap and RKCB.

Satellite Mode's song "Terrified" was featured on the MTV Movie Awards, and their track "Bad Woman" was included on season one, episode seven of Freeform's Good Trouble.

== Members ==
Current Members
Name	Instrument	Years active
Jessica Carvo	Lead Vocals/Production/Live Instrumentals	2015–present
Alex Marko	Instrumentals/Production/Vocals	2015–present

== Discography ==
Discography
Title	Type	Release date	Label	Notes
"Wild Excuses"	Single	2015	BluElephant Records	
"Aphrodite"	Single	2015	BluElephant Records	
"Warm Fire Lightning"	Single	2016	BluElephant Records	
Wild Excuses	EP	2017	BluElephant Records	
Wild Excuses (Deluxe)	Album	2017	BluElephant Records	
"Warm Fire Lightning" (Flip)	Single	2018	Roc Nation	Artists: Ninajirachi and Satellite Mode
"Gave It All"	Single	2018	BluElephant Records	
"Gave It All" (Prismo Remix)	Single	2018	BluElephant Records	Artists: Satellite Mode, Prismo
"Terrified"	Single	2018	BluElephant Records	
"Gave It All 2.0"	Single	2018	BluElephant Records	Artists: Satellite Mode, Xiutezcatl
"Terrified" (Alex Lustig Remix)	Single	2018	BluElephant Records	Artists: Satellite Mode, Alex Lustig
"Terrified" (Acoustic)	Single	2018	BluElephant Records	
"Terrified" (Robinson Brakebill Remix)	Single	2018	BluElephant Records	Artists: Satellite Mode, Robinson Brakebill
"Kissing in Photographs"	Single	2019	BluElephant Records	
"Sepia"	Single	2019	AntiFragile Music	
Robots vs. Party Girls	EP	2020	AntiFragile Music	
"Pony Express"	Single	2021	BluElephant Records	
