= Pleasure to Meet You =

Studio album by Dead Sara
- Released: March 31, 2015
- Length: 44:47
- Label: INgrooves; Pocket Kid
- Producer: Noah Shain; Dead Sara

Dead Sara chronology
Dead Sara (2012)	Pleasure to Meet You (2015)	Temporary Things Taking Up Space (2018)

Pleasure to Meet You is the second album by American rock band Dead Sara. It was released on March 31, 2015 under INgrooves Music Group and Pocket Kid Records. The band financed the album with a PledgeMusic campaign, with pledgers receiving a free download of the single "Suicidal". It's also the last record with bassist Chris Null, who departed the band a few months after the album was released.

Music videos were released for the songs "Mona Lisa" and "Something Good", both of which were performed live on Late Night with Seth Meyers on April 1, 2015.

== Track listing ==
All lyrics are written by Emily Armstrong; all music is composed by Dead Sara.

Pleasure to Meet You track listing
No.	Title	Length
1.	"Suicidal"	3:39
2.	"L.A. City Slum"	3:24
3.	"Mona Lisa"	3:14
4.	"Something Good"	4:11
5.	"Lovesick"	2:59
6.	"Radio One Two"	3:40
7.	"Mr. Mr."	4:21
8.	"Greaser"	3:28
9.	"Blue Was the Beautiful You"	5:26
10.	"Feel Right at Home"	4:24
11.	"For You I Am"	6:01
Total length:		44:47

== Personnel ==
Dead Sara

- Emily Armstrong – vocals, guitar
- Siouxsie Medley – guitar
- Chris Null – bass guitar
- Sean Friday – drums, percussion

Additional musicians

- Maxim Ludwig – harmonica
- Eugene Toale – saxophone

Technical

- Noah Shain – production, engineering, mixing
- Dave Collins – mastering
- Dalton Hibbard – assistant engineering
- Mike McCmullen – artwork
- Brian Bowen-Smith – photography

== Charts ==
Chart performance for Pleasure to Meet You
Chart (2015)	Peak position
US Top Current Albums (Billboard)	99
US Heatseekers Albums (Billboard)	2
US Independent Albums (Billboard)	17
US Top Rock Albums (Billboard)	33
