= Coyle Girelli =

English musician

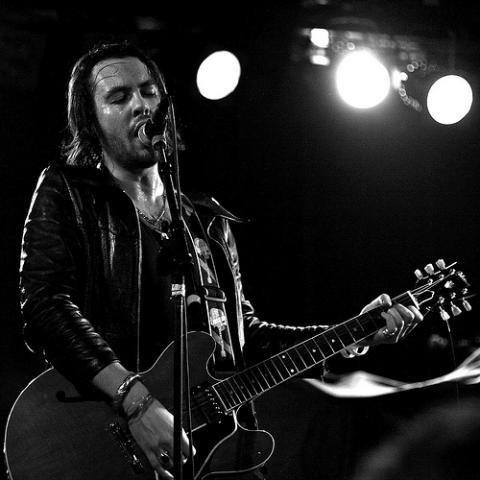
- Girelli in Detroit

Background information
- Origin: Otley, West Yorkshire, England
- Genres: Indie folk, Americana, alternative rock, musical theater, opera, pop rock, pop
- Occupations: Ceo singer songwriter composer producer multi-instrumentalist producer
- Instruments: Vocals, guitar, piano, mandolin, keyboards, drums, production
- Years active: 2007–present
- Labels: Sun Records; Universal Republic; Epic Records; Primary Wave Music; Fierce Panda Records; So Recordings; Capitol Records; Sony Music Entertainment; BMG Rights Management; Honey Lemon Records; Calm and Collected Music Group

Coyle Girelli is a British and American recording artist, multi-platinum selling songwriter, composer, record producer, multi-instrumentalist, theater producer and entrepreneur. He is a co-founder and CEO of music company Calm and Collected Music Group and CAC Music Publishing and is the founder of entertainment production company Goldfire Productions, as well as being involved in several other business ventures. Formerly frontman of alternative rock bands Your Vegas and The Chevin he released his debut solo album, Love Kills, in 2018. He has written songs for BTS, Daisy the Great, Robin Schulz, Westlife and many others and co-composed songs for the record breaking French musicals Robin des Bois and Les Trois Mousquetaires. His sophomore solo album Funland was released in February 2022 to critical acclaim and his third solo album "Museum Day" released in autumn 2023. His fourth solo album "Out Of This Town" was released on Sun Records in 2025 and featured a collection of songs written with legendary songwriter Mac Davis.

== Early life ==
Girelli grew up in Otley, West Yorkshire. There he attended Prince Henry's Grammar School where he met the 3 other founding members of Your Vegas.

Girelli attended University of Leeds, completing a degree in Law and Criminology.

== Music career ==
=== Your Vegas 2005–2011 ===
Girelli, along with Mat Steel, Jon Langford, Mal Taylor and Mark Heaton, formed alternative rock band Your Vegas in 2005 while studying at Leeds University. He was the singer and songwriter in Your Vegas. The band released several self-produced singles in the UK before signing to Universal Republic in 2007 and releasing debut album A Town And Two Cities in May 2008.

The band extensively toured across the US and Canada, completing a series of North American tours including two tours with The Bravery, two full North American tours with Duran Duran and a run with Shiny Toy Guns. Your Vegas performed at various US Music festivals, including The Bamboozle, Bonnaroo, Lollapalooza, SXSW and All Points West.

Girelli made his network television with Your Vegas in the US on Last Call with Carson Daly with Your Vegas.

Your Vegas founded their own celebrity football team along with MLS Magazine called Champions United. On 22 November 2008, they played a charity football match against Hollywood United. Proceeds raised from the event went towards helping hurricane victims in Houston. Since the event, Girelli has participated in a number of Hollywood United games and events.

Steven Spielberg's Discovery Channel documentary Rising: Rebuilding Ground Zero to commemorate the 10th anniversary of the 11 September terrorist attack in New York used "Salvador" written by Girelli as its theme music.

=== The Chevin 2011–2015 ===
In 2010, Girelli founded British alternative band The Chevin together with former Your Vegas bandmates Langford, Steel and Taylor. Girelli wrote and produced debut release The Champion EP released on Fierce Panda in the UK. He also wrote debut album Borderland produced by American producer Noah Shain. Lead single "Champion" along with several other of his songs from album Borderland have appeared in films, trailers, commercials, computer games and television shows across the globe, including "Champion" on the FIFA 13 soundtrack.

The band toured extensively across North America and Europe, including tours with Franz Ferdinand, White Lies, Airborne Toxic Event and The Pigeon Detectives and festival appearances at Firefly Music Festival, T In The Park, Lollapalooza, SXSW Music Festival, Live at Leeds, Camden Crawl, The Great Escape Festival and Bingley Music Live.

Girelli made several network television appearances with The Chevin including on the Late Show with David Letterman and on Conan.

After a hiatus from 2014, The Chevin began releasing new music in summer 2019 with singles "Under The Thunder" and "Big Machine."

=== Songwriting ===
Girelli writes songs and produces for many other major label recording artists and his releases include BTS, Macklemore, Westlife, Daisy the Great, Robin Schulz, Echosmith, Sister Sparrow & The Dirty Birds, Spencer Ludwig, Alex Winston, The Movielife, Story Untold, Peking Duk, Rozes, Sam Feldt, Asher Roth, and Arty. He has collaborated with songwriters including Linda Perry, Mac Davis, The Stereotypes, LP, Scott Harris, Amy Allen (songwriter), Dan Nigro and Sterling Fox. He appeared on stage with Peking Duk as a guest vocalist several times including performances at Lollapalooza and Electric Zoo and their 2018 US and European tours.

In 2015, Girelli composed music for short film Shaded Reflections which was selected for the Cannes Film Festival and the Manhattan Film Festival where he won the award for 'Best Original Song'.

In 2016, Girelli founded a New York City based independent record label called Honey Lemon Records. He has released several New York based artists on the label including French singer Livia Blanc and The Dawn of MAY.

He co-founded CAC Music Publishing in 2023. The company has a catalog of over 27,000 songs and a roster of hundreds of writers.

=== Musical theater ===
Robin Des Bois (2013) and Le 3 Mousquetaires (2016)

He co-composed the 2013 French musical sensation Robin des Bois along with Micheal Malih, David Hallyday, Fred Château, Mathieu Mendès, Corneille, Shaka Ponk, John Mamann and Stanislas. His song "Gloria" from the show also appears on opera singer Vincent Niclo's 2013 album Luis. Girelli co-composed the 2016 French musical Les 3 Mousquetaires. He is currently working on several new musical theater projects in New York City and Europe.

True Love Forever (2024)

In January 2023, Girelli released the single "True Love Forever" together with an announcement of a new theatrical show created in collaboration with immersive theater company Third Rail Projects. The show is titled "True Love Forever." The show opened with a run of sold-out performances at Art X in lower Manhattan, New York in November 2024 with more runs of sold-out shows in late 2024 and early 2025. Girelli released a second single from the show titled "You" in December 2024.

Reincarnation Blues (2025)

In June 2023, it was announced that Reincarnation Blues, a new musical Girelli created and composed with Ben Thornewill and Laura Zlatos, based on the critically acclaimed book of the same name, was selected for development at the prestigious Rhinebeck Writers Retreat in the summer of 2023. In early 2025 a live performance of music from the show was performed at Drom in downtown Manhattan featuring Broadway performers Morgan Siobhan Green, and Eleri Ward. In April 2025 a closed workshop and presentation of the show took at place at The Other Palace in London and featured Broadway actor Noah Ricketts as male lead Milo.

=== Love Kills 2018–2020 ===
In 2017, Girelli announced on Twitter that he is working on a debut solo record Love Kills to be released in summer 2018.

Debut single "Where's My Girl?" was released 11 May 2018 described by Clash Magazine as a "swooning knee trembler". Follow up single "My Blue Heart" was released on 8 June 2018.

The 11 track album Love Kills was released to widespread acclaim on 21 September 2018. Atwood Magazine called the album "A beautifully dark masterpiece" while High Voltage Magazine called it "possibly be the most surprising musical diamond find of the year". with Girelli's vocal performance frequently compared to Roy Orbison and Elvis Presley

The song "In Your Arms", from Love Kills was used in season 2, episode 2 of Netflix TV show StartUp. An early version of "Naked Soul" was used as the music for a Naked Cashmere campaign with a video made featuring supermodel Kate Moss. "Naked Soul" also featured in the 2019 Peter Lindbergh documentary 'Peter Lindbergh – Women's Stories.'

"Something Strange in the Night" from Love Kills was used in Season 4, Episode 3 of Netflix show Chilling Adventures of Sabrina.

"Naked Soul" from Love Kills was used in MTV show Catfish: The TV Show Season 8, Episode 33

Girelli recorded a version of "Bitter Sweet Symphony" for Sacha Gervasi's Emmy Award nominated HBO film, My Dinner with Hervé, released in October 2018.

In November 2018, Girelli released "Christmas And Me" EP featuring two original songs, "Christmas And Me Are Through" and "The Lights" as well as versions of "O Holy Night", "I'll Be Home for Christmas" and "Christmas Don't Be Late".

The album became the basis and inspiration behind the theatrical collaboration with Third Rail Projects resulting in the creation of the immersive theater show True Love Forever.

=== Funland 2021–2023 ===
In October 2021, Girelli released single "Fun," the first single from his second album Funland.

Funland was released to critical acclaim on 25 February 2022, with Rolling Stone Australia calling it "a contender for record of the year." AAA Backstage stated "Girelli has a certain type of song writing that oozes a sense of beauty and feeling. A lot of artists write lovely albums but this one from start to finish is that of a masterpiece...." Atwood Magazine described its sound as "Soaring and cinematic".

An acoustic album called Stripped featuring several acoustic versions of songs on Funland, as well as a cover of the Leonard Cohen song, "Famous Blue Raincoat" and of the First Aid Kit's song, "Fireworks", was released on 22 July 2022.

The track "Porno" was used in the closing scene and title credits in Episode 6 of the Apple TV show Smoke featuring Taron Egerton.

=== "Museum Day" 2023–2024 ===
"Museum Day", the first single from Girelli's third solo album was released on 14 June 2023. With follow up singles "Jane Tells a Lie" released on 26 July 2023. "So Predictable" and "Between Us" released throughout out 2023. The album was critically acclaimed and described as "an ode to New York" and "a soul-stirring celebration of life, love and NYC" by Atwood Magazine and a "musical masterpiece" by AAA Backstage.

An EP of acoustic versions of songs from the album was released in May 2024.

=== "Out Of This Town" 2025 ===
On June 13, 2025, Girelli released the single "Pretty" and announced a new album titled "Out Of This Town" which would be released on Sun Records and was co-written with Mac Davis.

Other singles released from "Out Of This Town" were "Everyone But Me and You" which featured a duet with Cassandra Lewis and "Lost to the River" which featured a duet with KT Tunstall

== Artist discography ==
=== Solo ===
Studio albums

- Love Kills – Coyle Girelli (21 September 2018)
- Funland – Coyle Girelli (25 February 2022)
- Stripped – Coyle Girelli (22 July 2022)
- Museum Day – Coyle Girelli (27 October 2023)
- Out Of This Town – Coyle Girelli (Sun Records, 29 August 2025)
- Out Of This Town (Deluxe Version) - Coyle Girelli (Sun Records, 30 October 2026)

Extended plays

- Christmas And Me EP – Coyle Girelli (30 November 2018)
- Museum Day – Acoustics EP – Coyle Girelli (24 May 2024)
- True Love Forever EP – Coyle Girelli (21 March 2025)

Singles

- "Where's My Girl?" – Coyle Girelli (11 May 2018)
- "My Blue Heart" – Coyle Girelli (8 June 2018)
- "Disappear" – Coyle Girelli (17 August 2018)
- "Love Kills" – Coyle Girelli (14 September 2018)
- "The Lights" – Coyle Girelli (23 November 2018)
- "Fun" – Coyle Girelli (1 October 2021)
- "From 7th Street with Love" – Coyle Girelli (17 November 2021)
- "Here Comes My Baby" – Coyle Girelli (12 January 2022)
- "Do You Wanna Dance?" – Coyle Girelli (16 February 2022)
- "Famous Blue Raincoat" / "Fireworks" – Coyle Girelli (6 July 2022)
- "Modern Noir – Stripped" – Coyle Girelli (13 July 2022)
- "True Love Forever" – Coyle Girelli (27 January 2023)
- "Museum Day" – Coyle Girelli (14 June 2023)
- "Jane Tells a Lie" – Coyle Girelli (26 July 2023)
- "So Predictable" – Coyle Girelli (8 September 2023)
- "Between Us" – Coyle Girelli (29 September 2023)
- "The Girl – Acoustic Version" – Coyle Girelli (12 April 2024)
- "You" – Coyle Girelli (13 December 2024)
- "Pretty" – Coyle Girelli (13 June 2025)
- "Everyone But Me and You" – Coyle Girelli (feat. Cassandra Lewis (11 July 2025)
- "Lost To The River" – Coyle Girelli (feat. KT Tunstall (11 July 2025)

=== With The Chevin ===
Studio albums

- Borderland – The Chevin (So Recordings 2012)

Extended plays

- Champion EP – The Chevin (Fierce Panda 2011)

Singles

- "Drive" – The Chevin (So Recordings, 28 May 2012)
- "Blue Eyes" – The Chevin (So Recordings, 6 August 2012) – (UK only)
- "Champion" – The Chevin (So Recordings, 7 August 2012)
- "Under The Thunder" – The Chevin (So Recordings, 21 August 2019)
- "Big Machine" – The Chevin (So Recordings, 16 October 2019)

=== With Your Vegas ===
Studio albums

- A Town And Two Cities – Your Vegas (Republic Records 2008)

Extended plays

- Your Vegas EP – Your Vegas (Epic Records 2006)
- Flybuzz EP – Your Vegas (Epic Records 2006)
- A Town And Two Cities EP – Your Vegas (Republic Records 2008)

Singles

- "Your Vegas" – Your Vegas (Epic Records, January 2006) UK
- "Flybuzz" – Your Vegas (Epic Records, August 2006) UK
- "The Way The War Was Won" – Your Vegas (2008) US
- "In My Head" – Your Vegas (Republic Records, June 2008) US
- "Christmas And Me Are Through" – Your Vegas (Primary Wave Music, 20 January 2009)

=== Other songs ===
- "Naked Soul" – Coyle Girelli 2016 – (Kate Moss for Naked Cashmere campaign)
- "Bitter Sweet Symphony" – Schukulu feat. Coyle Girelli 2018 – (Recorded for Sacha Gervasi's HBO film, My Dinner with Hervé).

=== As featured artist ===
- "On Your Own" – Serge Devant (feat. Coyle Girelli) 2012
- "Something For Nothing" – Asher Roth (feat. Coyle Girelli) 2014
- "Something For Nothing" – Blended Babies (feat. Coyle Girelli) 2015
- "Dragonfly" – Blended Babies (feat. Coyle Girelli) 2016
- "Beautiful Girl" – Blended Babies (feat. Coyle Girelli) 2017
- "Neon Rose" – Neon Tiger (feat. Coyle Girelli) 2017
- "Digital Perfection" – LEFTI (feat. Coyle Girelli) 2017
- "Supposed To Be" – Arty (feat. Coyle Girelli) 2017
- "Galaxies" – Nicolas Haelg 2018
- "Song Goes On" – Keli Holiday (feat. Coyle Girelli) 2021

== Music videos ==
List of music videos, showing year released and directors
Title	Year	Director(s)
"The Way The War Was Won"	2008	Barney Miller
"In My Head"	2008	Barney Miller
"Champion"	2011	Jon Danovic
"Champion"	2012	Jon Danovic
"Drive"	2012	Tyler Oliver
"Blue Eyes"	2012	Ian Gamester
"Fun"	2021	Kevin Newbury
"From 7th Street with Love"	2021	Kevin Newbury
"Here Comes My Baby"	2022	Jon Danovic
"Do You Wanna Dance"	2022	Jon Danovic
"True Love Forever"	2023	Jennine Willett
"Museum Day"	2023	Jon Danovic
"Jane Tells a Lie"	2023	Aysia Marotta
"Pretty"	2025	Jon Danovic
"Lost to the River"	2025	Jon Danovic
"Out Of This Town"	2025	Jon Danovic

== Musical theater ==
- Robin des Bois (2013)
- Les Trois Mousquetaires (2016)
- True Love Forever (2024)
- Reincarnation Blues
- Choreomania

Year	Title	Role	Playwright	Venue	Ref.
2013	Robin des Bois	Composer	Patrice Guirao and Lionel Florence	Palais des congrès de Paris, Paris	
2016	Les Trois Mousquetaires	Composer	Patrice Guirao and Lionel Florence	Palais des congrès de Paris, Paris	
2024/2025	True Love Forever	Composer, co-Creator, producer	n/a	Art X, New York City	
2026	Teeth 'n' Smiles	Co-Producer	David Hare	Duke of York's Theatre, London	
2026	Hay Fever (play)	Co-Producer	Noël Coward	Wyndham's Theatre	

== Television ==
Year	Title	Role	Notes
2008	Last Call With Carson Daly	himself	Musical guest
2012	The Late Show with David Letterman	himself	Musical Guest
2012	Conan	himself	Musical Guest

== Tours ==
- UK Tour (with The Bluetones 2005)
- UK Tour (with Shed Seven 2005)
- Highlands and Islands Tour (2005)
- UK Tour (Headline 2006)
- North America Tour (with The Bravery 2008)
- North America Red Carpet Massacre Tour Part 1 (with Duran Duran 2008)
- US Tour (with Shiny Toy Guns 2008)
- US Tour (Headline 2008)
- North America Red Carpet Massacre Tour Part 2 (with Duran Duran 2008)
- US Tour (A Town And Two Cities Tour 2008)
- UK Tour (Headline 2011)
- UK Tour (with The Airborne Toxic Event 2011)
- UK Tour (with The Pigeon Detectives 2011)
- European Tour (with White Lies 2011)
- European Tour (with Franz Ferdinand 2012)
- European Tour (with The Pigeon Detectives 2012)
- UK Tour (Headline 2012)
- European Tour (Headline 2012)
- US Tour (with The Airborne Toxic Event 2012)
- North America Tour (with The Psychedelic Furs & The Lemonheads 2012)
- European Tour (Headline 2013)
- North America Tour (with Peking Duk 2018)
- European Tour (with Peking Duk 2018)
- North America Tour (with Jukebox the Ghost 2022)
- North America Tour (with The Psychedelic Furs 2022)

== Business ventures ==
In early 2019 Girelli founded Calm and Collected Music Group with Andrew Horowitz and Chris Leon. The company has grown rapidly since its formation and has a large roster of artists and writers and an expansive catalog of music across many genres that have generated billions of streams across DSPs. The company includes several subsidiary record labels, a publishing company, subscription website, visual and podcast productions.

In 2023 he co-founded CAC Music Publishing. The company has a catalog of over 26,000 copyrights and a roster of hundreds of writers.

In 2026 Girelli founded entertainment production company Goldfire Productions. The first show the company was involved in was a West End revival of "Teeth "n" Smiles" starring Self Esteem (musician) and Phil Daniels. The company also invested in a new production of Noël Coward's play Hay Fever (play) staring Richard E. Grant and Christine Baranski which was performed at the Wyndham's Theatre in London's West End.

== Personal life ==
Girelli is British born, growing up in Otley, West Yorkshire. He became an American citizen in July 2025 becoming a dual citizen. He lives in New York City, Westhampton, NY and Los Angeles. He is a passionate and vocal supporter of English Premier League team Manchester City.
