= Your Vegas =

British rock band

- Origin: Leeds, Yorkshire, England
- Genres: Alternative rock; pop rock
- Years active: 2005–2010
- Label: Universal Republic
- Spinoffs: The Chevin, Coyle Girelli
- Members: Coyle Girelli; Jon Langford; Mat Steel; Mal Taylor
- Website: www.yourvegasmusic.com

Your Vegas was a British rock band from Leeds, England, formed by Coyle Girelli, Mat Steel, Jon Langford, Mal Taylor and Mark Heaton.

== Background ==
The band started playing music together while attending Prince Henry's Grammar School in Otley, West Yorkshire. Their first band was called Orka but they later changed their name to Salvadore. In December 2004 they joined forces with Mark Heaton, a friend from the Leeds music scene.

They signed with indie label White Duke Records in 2005 and the band released two self produced singles, Your Vegas and Flybuzz, the latter hitting number 12 in the UK Indie Chart. They toured the UK and in the summer of that year they performed on the unsigned stage at Leeds Festival.

In mid-2006, while taking a break from touring, Coyle visited friends in New York City where he played a few acoustic shows and handed out demos. The other four members flew out for a few weeks and the band played a handful of shows over the summer, generating interest from several major labels. By Christmas 2006 a record deal with Universal Republic was signed.

== A Town And Two Cities ==
2007 began with the band being chosen by Playboy magazine as one of their first "Rock The Rabbit" bands. The band designed a limited edition Your Vegas T-shirt for the campaign and performed at Playboy's spring break event in Cabo, Mexico.

They spent the rest of the year recording their debut album, A Town And Two Cities, with producer David Bendeth (Paramore, Breaking Benjamin) at his studio in New Jersey then, mixing it at Electric Lady Studios in New York City with Brian Sperber.

In January 2008, Your Vegas released its debut EP, A Town And Two Cities EP, which reached number 27 in the iTunes rock chart. In late January they performed at the Sundance Film Festival before embarking on their first North American tour as support for The Bravery.

In March 2008, the band played several shows at the SXSW festival in Austin, Texas before partnering with Pan Am for the release of their Spring/Summer 2008 collection of retro bags sold in Bloomingdale's stores in the US. The band appeared live in-store at the New York launch event. A Town And Two Cities was released in the US on 29 April, along with the leading single "In My Head".

In August 2011, the first episode of "Rising: Rebuilding Group Zero", directed by Steven Spielberg aired on the Discovery Channel in the US a few days ahead of the 10th anniversary of 9/11. The show's opening and closing credits featured their song "Salvador" from the album.

A Town And Two Cities was never released outside of the United States.

== Touring and Television ==
The rest of 2008 saw the band on the road across the US and Canada, as they completed six North American tours, including supporting two tours with The Bravery, as well as dates on tour supporting Duran Duran. Over the summer, Your Vegas headlined their own east coast tour of America and performed at various US Music festivals, including The Bamboozle, Bonnaroo, Lollapalooza, and All Points West. In November they were again an opening act, this time touring the US and Canada as support for Shiny Toy Guns.

Your Vegas made its US national network television debut on 5 May 2008 when they performed debut single, "In My Head", on Last Call with Carson Daly. A single released by the group, "Christmas and Me Are Through" was used as a closing adianoeta of the last episode of the inaugural season of the network series "Chuck".

In November 2008, Your Vegas founded their own celebrity football team along with MLS Magazine called Champions United. On 22 November 2008, they played a charity football match against Hollywood United, which resulted in a 7-7 draw. Proceeds raised from the event went towards helping hurricane victims in Houston. Since the event, Coyle and Jon have participated in a number of Hollywood United games and events.

Early 2009 saw the band come off the road and begin writing their second album. In March they took some time out to perform several shows again at the SXSW Music Festival in Austin, Texas, and then again in the summer months for a series of performances in New York. Labelled by the band as 'The Blitz', Your Vegas performed over 20 shows in under 40 days in NYC throughout the summer road testing new material.

After leaving Universal Republic in 2009, Girelli, Steel, Langford and Taylor formed The Chevin (band) in early 2010 releasing début album Borderland in 2012.

== Discography ==
=== Albums ===
Title	Album details
A Town And Two Cities	Released: 1 April 2008 (US digital); 29 April 2008 (US physical); Label: Universal Republic; Formats: CD, Digital download

=== EPs ===
Title	Album details
A Town And Two Cities EP	Released: January 2008 (US); Formats: CD, Digital download

=== Singles ===
- "Your Vegas" (August 2005) UK
- "Flybuzz" (January 2006) UK
- "In My Head" (June 2008) US

=== Other Tracks ===
- "Christmas And Me Are Through" (20 January 2009)
