= Troubled Times (disambiguation) =

Troubled Times is a 2012 album by Cast.

Troubled Times may also refer to:

- "Troubled Times", a song by Green Day from their 2016 album Revolution Radio
- "Troubled Times", a song by Screaming Trees from their 1992 album Sweet Oblivion
- "Troubled Times", a song by Fountains of Wayne from their 1999 album Utopia Parkway
- "Troubled Times", a song by Your Vegas from their 2007 album A Town and Two Cities

== See also ==
- Time of Troubles, period in Russian history between 1598 and 1613
