= Emily Armstrong =

American singer (born 1986)

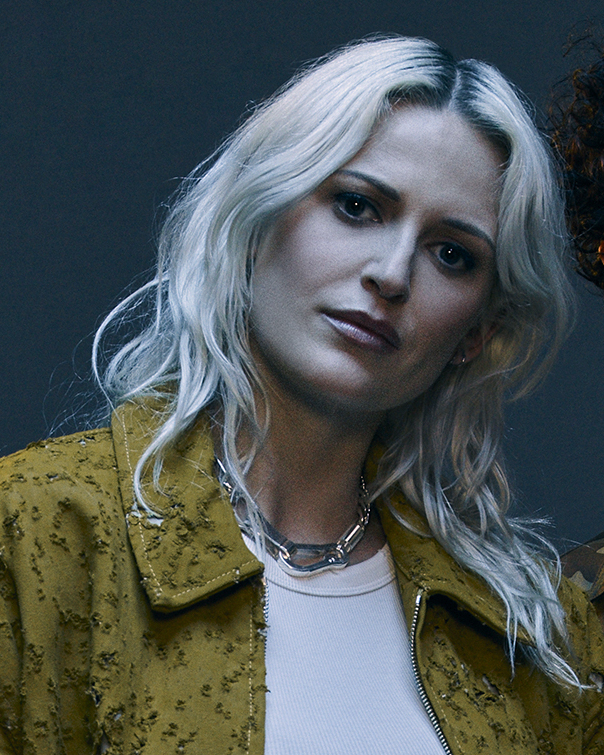
- Armstrong in 2024

Background information
- Born: Emily Marcia Armstrong; May 6, 1986 (age 40); Los Angeles, California, U.S.
- Genres: Hard rock; alternative rock; alternative metal; grunge
- Occupations: Singer; musician; songwriter
- Instruments: Vocals; guitar
- Years active: 2002–present
- Member of: Dead Sara; Linkin Park

Emily Marcia Armstrong (born May 6, 1986) is an American rock singer. Originally known as the lead singer and a co-founding member of the hard rock band Dead Sara, she currently serves as the lead singer of Linkin Park, which she joined upon the band’s reunion seven years after the death of their former singer Chester Bennington.

== Early life ==
Armstrong was born in Los Angeles. Her parents were prominent members of the Church of Scientology, and she was raised as a Scientologist. She started to write songs and play guitar when she was 11, and began to sing when she was 15. She dropped out of high school; she said she wanted to be in a rock band and had no interest in pursuing anything else. In an interview with the El Paso Times in 2012, Armstrong said music was the one thing that kept her motivated in life.

== Career ==
=== Dead Sara ===
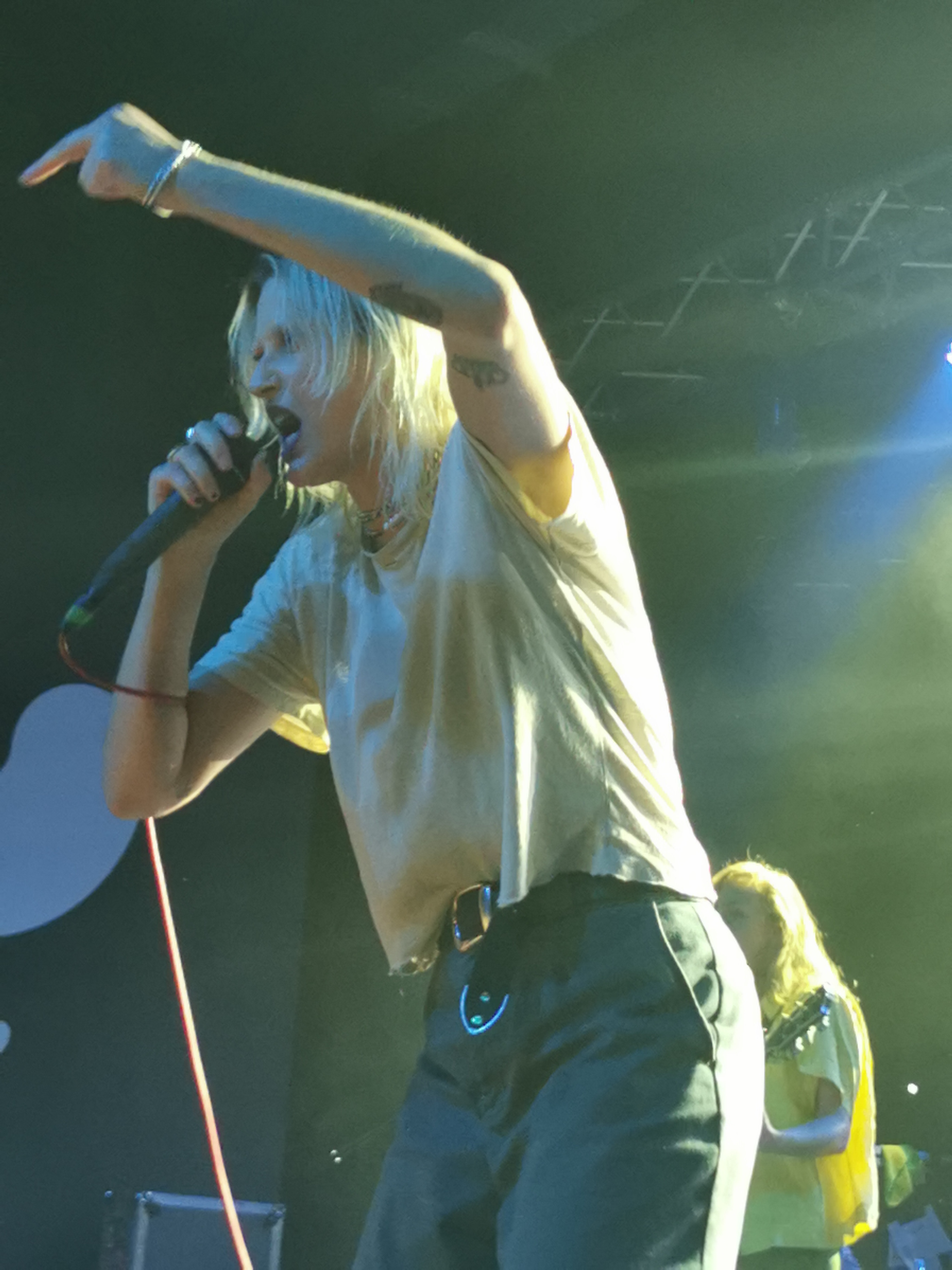
Armstrong with Dead Sara in Akvárium, Budapest

In 2002, Armstrong began playing with guitarist Siouxsie Medley, who she met through a mutual friend. They had similar taste in music; both Medley and Armstrong were influenced by Nirvana and L7, among others, and 1960s and 1970s folk and blues artists and classic rock bands such as Led Zeppelin, Stevie Nicks, Joni Mitchell, and Fleetwood Mac.

Initially known as Epiphany, Dead Sara's first gig was at the Los Angeles nightclub The Mint in March 2005. In addition to singing, Armstrong played the bass.

As a songwriter, Armstrong was significantly influenced by folk rock. Her interest in open and alternate tunings, such as those used by Mitchell, resulted in what Guitar World referred to as Dead Sara's signature sound. As a performer, she was influenced by artists including Iggy Pop and Janis Joplin.

Armstrong received significant attention as a singer before Dead Sara's debut was released. Noting her "strong, urgent sound", Grace Slick said Armstrong was a singer she admired in an interview with the Wall Street Journal in 2011, and Courtney Love brought Armstrong to New York to sing on Hole's 2010 album, Nobody's Daughter.

Prior to joining Linkin Park, she recorded and/or performed live with artists including the Offspring, Beck, Demi Lovato, Awolnation, and Robby Krieger of the Doors.

=== Linkin Park ===
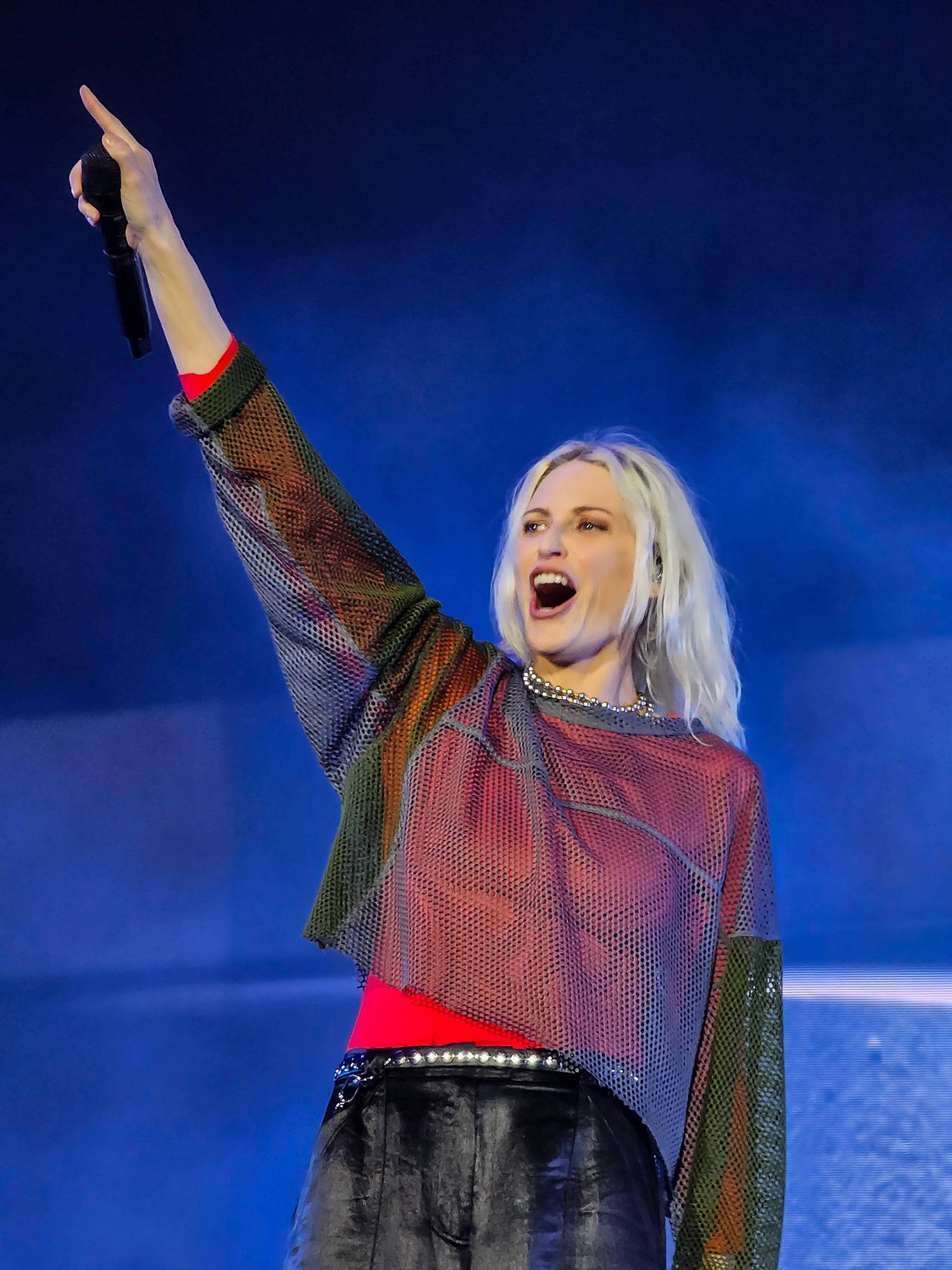
Armstrong performing with Linkin Park in 2024

On September 5, 2024, at the start of a livestreamed Linkin Park concert, Armstrong was introduced as the band's new co-lead vocalist. With the livestream came the announcement of From Zero, the band's eighth album, and the release of its lead single "The Emptiness Machine". Multi-instrumentalist and Linkin Park co-founder Mike Shinoda later stated that the band was inspired to reform after a series of sessions with Armstrong and new drummer Colin Brittain yielded music that he felt contained the band's "DNA."

Linkin Park's first public show with Armstrong took place on September 11, 2024, at the Kia Forum in Los Angeles. In a review in Los Angeles Times, Steve Appleford wrote: "Like Bennington, Armstrong is as capable with rich melodies as throat-ripping vocals, which fit naturally in the established Linkin Park sound." Chris Willman's review in Variety noted that the estimated audience of 17,000 were "clearly signaling their assent to her joining the band with a constant roar that roughly matched the one she was putting out."

== Personal life ==
Armstrong is queer. In 2016, Armstrong was in a relationship with model Kate Harrison.

=== Church of Scientology ===
In 2013, Armstrong was photographed attending the 44th Anniversary Gala of the Church of Scientology's Celebrity Centre International and, in a press release following the event, the Church identified her as one of several "prominent members". Shortly after Armstrong joined Linkin Park in September 2024, she was the subject of media reports about her ties to the church due to its controversies. Some of the band's fans were also critical of her affiliation with the Church. According to the BBC, Armstrong "has never publicly commented on her relationship with the church", but stated that "several" of Dead Sara's lyrics "suggest criticism and rejection of Scientology's teachings."

Also in September 2024, it came to light that Armstrong had attended a 2020 criminal hearing of former actor and convicted rapist Danny Masterson, a longtime Scientologist. Reports noted that one of Masterson's alleged victims, Chrissie Carnell-Bixler and her spouse, Mars Volta and At the Drive-In singer and former Scientologist Cedric Bixler-Zavala, were publicly critical of Armstrong's decision to attend a hearing during Masterson's trial. On September 6, Armstrong responded to the criticism to the court attendance, clarifying that while she attended one court appearance in support of someone she considered a friend at the time, she realized shortly afterward she should not have done so and had not spoken to the person since. She said she does not condone abuse or violence against women and empathizes with victims of these crimes.

== Discography ==
With Dead Sara

- The Airport Sessions (2008)
- Dead Sara (2012)
- Pleasure to Meet You (2015)
- The Covers (2017)
- Temporary Things Taking Up Space (2018)
- Ain't It Tragic (2021)

With Linkin Park

- From Zero (2024)
- Unshatter Flim Soundtrack (Live in São Paulo) (2026)
