= Leeds Festival Fringe =

Leeds Festival Fringe is a 7-day grassroots music festival held across several music venues in Leeds in the week prior to Leeds and Reading Festival. It was created in 2010 to showcase local talent before the main festival hits town.

Throughout the week, local promoters, bands, fanzines and on-line music communities all have their "takeover" of Leeds Festival Fringe thus bringing everyone who works all year round to benefit the local music scene together under one banner during one week.

The first year was very successful with over 120 performances, over 400 musicians playing in one week.

== 2010 ==
The 2010 event took place between 19 and 25 August.

=== Venues ===
- Carpe Diem
- The Well
- The New Conservatory
- Royal Park Cellars
- The Elbow Room
- The Dry Dock
- The Hop and The Northern Monkey.

=== Hosts ===
- All Sorted Records
- The Beat Surrender
- Broken Heart Underground
- Bootscraper
- Claire Cameron Band
- Grain Division
- Hound Dog Promotions
- Liverpool Bands and Friends
- Lyrically Justified
- The Red Pills
- The Rhubarb Bomb
- Yorkshire Music Collective and Yorkshire Underground Band Show.

=== Artists ===
- Acid Drop
- Acoustic Jim
- Adam Findlay
- Adelaide Harlequin
- A Last Concern
- Alvin Purple
- Angry Vs The Bear
- Audit Control
- Beat The Red Light
- The Beau's
- Belleville
- Ben Peel
- Beretta Suicide
- Bernadette Dales
- Black Diamond Bay (UK)
- Black Water
- The Blind Dead McJones Band
- Bludger
- Bootscraper
- Caesar Stars
- The Captives
- China Shop Bull
- Chris Martin
- Chris Sharp
- Claire Cameron Band
- Claw of Panther
- Codego
- Confined Within
- Cotheria
- Cupboard Wolves
- Danny Gruff
- Diamond Dac Charnley
- The Dirty Jeans
- Down The Machine
- Egypsy
- 4 Day Weekend
- El Camino
- Elephants on Acid
- The Famous Class
- The Freewheel
- Faux Romantics
- Fight The Frontline
- For The Ride
- The Fuzz
- Gaia
- Gentle Breeze
- Gerry Cooper
- Ghosts In The Nightclub
- Giraffey Fantastic
- Hemingway
- The Idles
- IMP
- The Insight
- Jack and Gill's Daughter
- Jasmine Kennedy
- The Jaw-Line of Julianne Moore
- JB Butterfield
- Jen Armstrong Music
- Johnny Powell
- Jonny The Firth
- Kath and The Mighty Menace
- Lifescreen
- Lou Gibbs
- Louise Distras
- Luva Gunk
- Man Get Out
- March of the Defiants
- Matt Bentley
- The Melodicas New Reed
- Merry-Go
- Mi Mye
- Miranda versus The Crok
- Mondo Cane
- Montauk Island
- The Moves
- Mr Gary C
- Mutiny For Hire
- New York Alcoholic Anxiety Attack
- Old Man Pie
- Pastel Jack
- Philip Cockerham
- Quiet Rebellion
- Radio Gypsy
- The Red Pills
- Redstar
- Revenge of The Psychotronic Man
- Road To Horizon
- Runaround Kids
- Scott Anthony Wainwright
- Secret Circuits
- Secrets of Kaplan
- Silverlode
- The Shrinks
- The Sickmen of Europe
- The Sighting
- Spiders Eat Vinyl
- The Spills
- S.S.S.S.S.
- Standard Fare
- State of Error
- The Stella Frays
- Steph Stephenson
- The Swindells
- The Tabbs
- Tag-Team Preacher
- The Temps
- The Tender Hooligans
- 13 Lights
- Time of Hibu
- Volcanoes
- We Run Riot
- We Say No
- The Wick Effect
- X-Ray Cat Trio

== 2011 ==
The 2011 event took place between 18 and 24 August.

=== Venues ===
- Carpe Diem
- The New Conservatory
- Milo
- Empire
- The Dry Dock
- The Well
- The Northern Monkey
- The Ship
- The Grove
- Baby Jupiter

=== Hosts ===
- All Sorted Records
- Bad Brains
- The Beat Surrender
- Bootscraper
- Grain Division
- Hound Dog Promotions
- I 'heart' Indie
- Lyrically Justified
- Metal Fringe
- Northern Torch
- The Red Pills
- Yorkshire Music Collective

=== Artists ===
- AB Negative
- A Day For Heroes
- A Kick Inside
- Alice Ostapjuk
- Anna Fur Laxis
- Anita Maj
- Arizona Bay
- The Artists
- Ashe Vendetta
- Ashwin Thomas
- Banditos
- Bang Bang Romeo
- Ben Peel & The Wool City Folk Club
- The Big I Am
- The Blind Dead McJones Band
- Bludger
- The Boneyard
- Bootscraper
- British Racing Green
- Catfish and the Bottlemen
- Cats for Peru
- Chasing Dragons
- Chris Martin
- Claire Cameron Band
- The Coopers
- Crysis
- The Dangerous Aces
- Dan Burnett
- The Dawnriders
- Deadwall
- Deep In The Mire
- Diamond Dac
- Charnley
- Dirty Fakirs
- Disco Machine Gun
- DJ Ryan Carter
- Down The Machine
- Dr. Sketchy
- Echo Town
- Eclectic Sparks
- Eden
- Every Dying Moment
- Fade Away
- 4 Letter Holiday
- Further From The Truth
- Gerry Cooper
- The Guilt Charm
- Hail To The Eskimo
- Happy Red Tractors
- The Idol Dead
- Idiot Box
- I Said The Spy
- Izzy Thomas
- Jack's Attic
- John Parkes
- Jumping Ships
- Karma Slave
- Katy Haymer
- King Headlock
- Leeds Burlesque
- Leesa Mae
- LeeSun
- Little Black Hearts
- Louise Distras
- Marsicans
- Matt Bentley
- Medicine Bow
- The Mexanines
- Michelle Nadia
- Middleman
- Miranda vs. The Crok
- Mishkin*The Mo-Mos
- Mr. Gary C
- Neve
- NGOD
- Northern Torch
- Ols Moore & The Gypsy Dogs
- One Stop Railway
- The Paper Smiles
- The Peppermint Hunting Lodge
- Penguin
- Pocket of 3
- Project Metropolis
- Propane Penny
- PseudoNympho
- Raw Peaches
- The Red Pills
- Redwire
- Road To Horizon
- Rupert Stroud
- Ryan Mitchell-Smith
- Ryder
- Scott Wainwright
- Seas of Green
- Sebastopher
- Sharp Darts
- Silverlode
- 16-Bit Revival
- Skint and Demoralised
- Spiders
- Steph Stephenson
- Stolen Peace
- The Soul Circle Gang
- So What Robot
- Sunday For The Suspect
- The Swindells
- TestTone3
- Ti Amo
- Tomorrow We Radio
- Town Street Seamonster
- Two Sevens
- Two Trick Horse
