= Black Diamond Bay =

Black Diamond Bay may refer to:

- Black Diamond Bay (song), a song written by Bob Dylan and Jacques Levy
- Black Diamond Bay (band), a band headed by Canadian musician Patrick Krief
- Black Diamond Bay (UK), an English independent electronic band
