= Bingley Music Live =

Annual music festival in West Yorkshire, England

- Genre: Rock, alternative rock, indie rock, pop music
- Dates: Friday, Saturday and Sunday at the end August
- Locations: Bingley, England, United Kingdom
- Years active: 2007 - 2018
- Website: bingleymusiclive.com

Bingley Music Live was an annual music festival held in Myrtle Park, Bingley, West Yorkshire, England. The festival featured a range of musical genres including rock, alternative rock, indie rock and pop music. Organised by City of Bradford Council, it was held on the Saturday and Sunday and since the 2009 event, also on the Friday at the end of August, with one of the days having free admission. First held in 2007, it was shortlisted in the ‘Best New Festival’ category of the Virtual Festival Awards. The ethos of the event was to present high quality music at an affordable price and give a platform for local bands from across West Yorkshire to a large audience.

== History ==
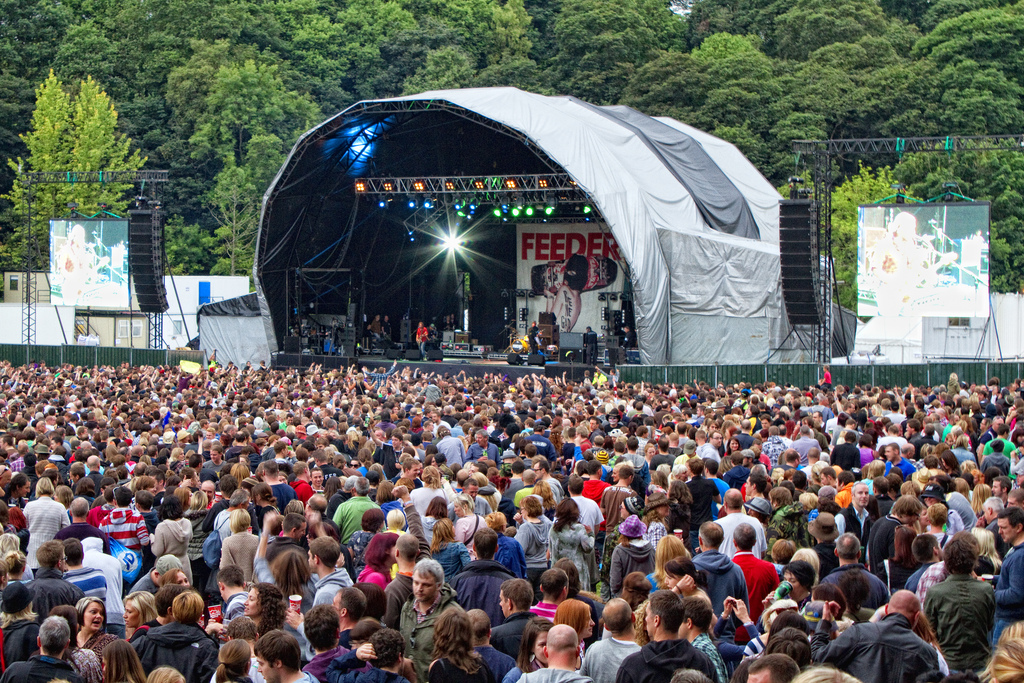
Crowds are entertained by a performance from Feeder at Bingley Music Live: 2011

Bingley Music Live evolved from a previous event at the same venue called Music At Myrtle. Music at Myrtle was first held in 1991, had free admission, and featured headline performances by tribute acts and bands from the 1960s and 1970s, such as The Searchers, Alvin Stardust, local band Smokie, Suzi Quatro, Showaddywaddy, Hot Chocolate, Edwin Starr and Boney M.

In 1998, it became a two-day event with the addition of The Pulse Party in The Park (external link). Programming for the Party in the Park was by local radio station, Pulse FM and featured contemporary pop acts, such as Rachel Stevens, McFly, Liberty X, Busted and Gareth Gates. In this format, it continued successfully for eight years.

In February 2007, it was announced that the event was to be cancelled because of escalating costs, shrinking audiences and a decline in support from the music industry for this type of event. Bradford Council took on the sole responsibility for organising the event giving it a new identity as Bingley Music Live in September that year.

In 2009 the format was a free family night followed by a ticketed Saturday and Sunday lineup. The 2019 event was cancelled, in part due to the cost of running the event, which was running at a loss of £300,000 for 2018. It has not been held since 2018, but it was discussed again in 2026 in the hopes that the event could be revived.

== 2007 ==
Saturday 1 September Line Up - Free Admission

Sunday 2 September Line Up - Ticketed day

| Saturday | Sunday |
| From the Jam; The Bluetones; White Light Parade; The Touch, Splash Alley; The Analogue Bombs; Sharp Darts. | The Charlatans; The Twang; Milburn; Elliot Minor; Random Hand; Scars on 45; The Good Die Young; Talk to Angels. |

== 2008 ==
Saturday 30 August Line Up - Ticketed day

Sunday 31 August Line Up - Free Admission

| Saturday | Sunday |
| Happy Mondays; Scouting for Girls; The Automatic; Terrorvision; Delays; Infadels; Ebony Bones; Sergeant; Billy The Kid; Michael Mallinson | Echo & the Bunnymen; Alabama 3; Natty; The King Blues; Jubilee; The Sylvias; Desert Eskimo; redwire, Hundred Dollar Cigar. |

== 2009 ==
Friday 4 September - Free Admission

Saturday 5 September / Sunday 6 September - Ticketed

| Friday | Saturday | Sunday |
| The Undertones; Toploader; New 2; Pama International | Doves; The Zutons; Ocean Colour Scene; The Sunshine Underground; The Dykeenies; Detroit Social Club; The Moons; The Little Black Hearts; Disco Machine Gun | Editors; Calvin Harris; Reverend and The Makers; The Futureheads; The Qemists; VV Brown; White Belt Yellow Tag; Vandal Supreme; Spike Island |

== 2010 ==
| Friday | Saturday | Sunday |
| Buzzcocks; The Blackout; Dreadzone; Dan Le Sac Vs Scroobius Pip | James; Public Image Ltd; Reef; Example; Frightened Rabbit; Gaggle; Sound of Guns; The Mexanines; Jasmine Kennedy | The Enemy; Seasick Steve; The Levellers; Hadouken!; Professor Green; Craig Charles Fantasy Funk Band; Kassidy; The Dawnriders; Black Diamond Bay |

== 2011 ==
| Friday | Saturday | Sunday |
| Fun Lovin' Criminals; Skindred; The Go! Team; Young Guns; Alice Gold | Maxïmo Park; Feeder; Mystery Jets; Athlete; Jon Fratelli; White Denim; Dot Rotten; Dionne Bromfield; State of Error; Thirteen16 | Chase & Status; The Coral; Eliza Doolittle; Wretch 32; Stereo MCs; The Sunshine Underground; Russo; Kingheadlock; Geek |

== 2012 ==
| Friday | Saturday | Sunday |
| The Charlatans; Martha Reeves and the Vandellas; Kids in Glass Houses; Stooshe; Driving Lolita; Miles and Erica; Skinny Lister; Sadie and the Hotheads; Matt Belmont; Spirit of John; Barefoot Beware; All Too Human; Ballyhoo Eventide; Patrick McCallion's Small Words | Razorlight; DJ Fresh; The Pigeon Detectives; Delilah (musician); Space (band); The Jim Jones Revue; Black Spiders; The Chevin (band); The Scandal; The Lancashire Hotpots; King Charles; We Were Evergreen; Jake Bugg; Karima Francis; Lilygreen & Maguire; Maquipucuna; The Milk; Ti Amo; Deadwall; Dan Audio; Down The Machine; Gods of Hellfire; Control is Dead; Talking To Strangers; Return to Aljustrel | Nero; White Lies; Maverick Sabre; Hard-Fi; Katzenjammer; Clement Marfo & The Frontline; Citizens!; L Marshall; Marsicans; The Idiot B*stard Band; Yes Sir Boss; Ellen and the Escapades; Juan Zelada; Coco and the Butterfields; Me and My Friends; Nico Cara; The Coopers; Eskimo Fandango; The Simon Pollard Band; Foxes Faux; Tom Savage and the Hash Mafia; Joseph Tilston; Lunar Coup; Den Miller |

== 2013 ==
| Friday | Saturday | Sunday |
| The Human League; Neville Staple; Kat Men; The Dirty Rivers; Nina Nesbitt; Frankie & The Heartstrings; The Dunwells; Dave McPherson; Warme; Patrick McCallion | Primal Scream; The Fratellis; Tinchy Stryder; Wilko Johnson; Summer Camp; The Virginmarys; Loveable Rogues; The Temperance Movement; Down Radio; Chris Helme; The Electric Swing Circus; The Struts; The Lake Poets; Natasha Haws; Blackbeard's Tea Party; By Toutatis; Jade Helliwell | Chic; The Cribs; Katy B; The Wonder Stuff; Theme Park; China Rats; Sons And Lovers; St. Somebody; Lucy Spraggan; JJ Rosa; Cry Baby Cry; Man Can't Fly; Holy Moly And The Crackers; Dolomite Minor; Born Thief; Issimo |

== 2016 ==
2,3 and 4 September.

| Friday | Saturday | Sunday |
| Echo and the Bunnymen; The Lightning Seeds; Sigala; The BML David Bowie Celebration; Imani Williams; Alias Kid; As Sirens Fall | Tinie Tempah; Sigma; Peter Hook and The Light; Barenaked Ladies; Bill Ryder-Jones; Age of L.U.N.A.; Jake Isaac; Sound of the Sirens; The Membranes; Fling | Travis; All Saints; We Are Scientists; Black Grape; Clean Cut Kid; The Jacques; Blaenavon; Cattle & Cane; Pusher |

== 2017 ==
1, 2 and 3 September.

=== Main stage ===
| Friday | Saturday | Sunday |
| Manic Street Preachers; Maxïmo Park; Twin Atlantic; Cabbage | Kaiser Chiefs; Peter Doherty; Milburn; Sundara Karma; British Sea Power; Yak; Dan Owen; Willie J Healey; Sifaka | The Wombats; Feeder; Soul II Soul; Badly Drawn Boy; Little Comets; High Tyde; Krumm; Your Illuminations |

=== Discovery stage ===
| Friday | Saturday | Sunday |
| Tom Grennan; The Pale White; Dead Pretties; Lea Porcelain | The Big Moon; Stevie Parker; Tigercub; Anteros; Fangclub; The Old Pink House; Shimmerband; The Harriets | The Orielles; Muncie Girls; Get Inuit; Island; Neon Waltz; Tom Walker; Marsicans; Able's Army |

== 2018 ==
31 August, 1 and 2 September.

=== Main stage ===
| Friday | Saturday | Sunday |
| Shed Seven | Jake Bugg | Noel Gallagher's High Flying Birds |
