= Dead Sara =

American hard rock band

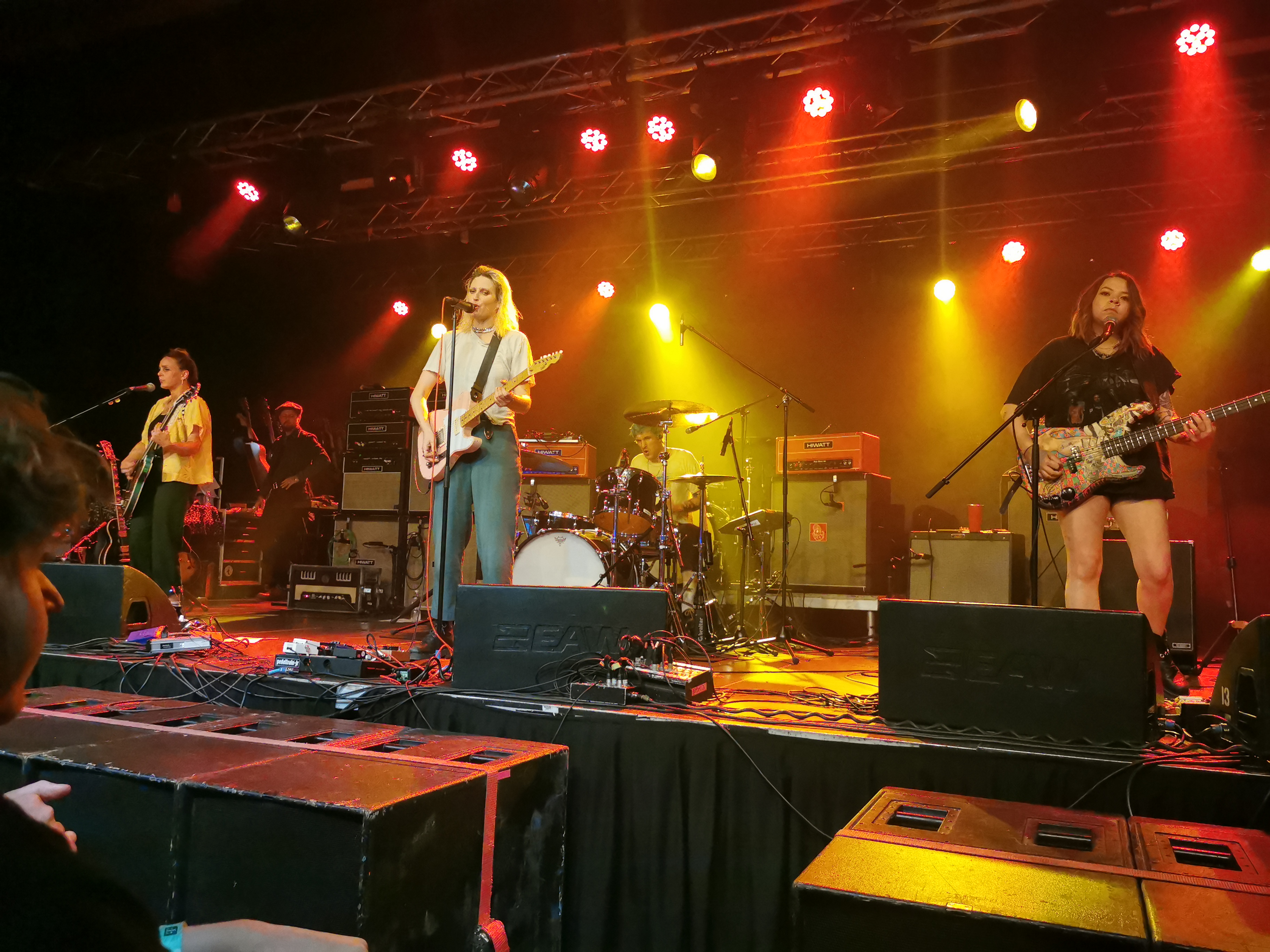
- Dead Sara performing in 2022

Background information
- Also known as: Epiphany (2002–2005)
- Origin: Los Angeles, California, U.S.
- Genres: Hard rock; punk rock; grunge; alternative rock
- Years active: 2002–present
- Labels: Warner; Pocket Kid; Atlantic; Viscount
- Members: Emily Armstrong; Siouxsie Medley; Sean Friday
- Past members: Chris Null
- Website: deadsara.com

Dead Sara is an American rock band from Los Angeles, consisting of Emily Armstrong (lead vocals, rhythm guitar), Siouxsie Medley (lead guitar, backing vocals), and Sean Friday (drums, backing vocals), best known for their single "Weatherman" from their debut album, Dead Sara (2012). Their second album, Pleasure to Meet You, was released in 2015. Their most recent album, Ain't It Tragic, was released in September 2021.

== History ==
=== Formation and early years (2002–2010) ===
Emily Armstrong and Siouxsie Medley both began as guitarists and singer-songwriters. Armstrong first picked up a guitar at the age of 12, while Medley began practicing from age 9 on a Fender Telecaster owned by her nanny (Dexy Valentine of Magic Wands), before two years' worth of saved allowances allowed Medley to buy her own guitar at age 11. Armstrong performed folk music as a solo artist and as a member of several school bands.

Armstrong and Medley met through a mutual friend in 2002, at ages 16 and 15 respectively. The pair began writing songs together in 2003; in 2004, they completed their first studio recording with the song "Changes". Their first live performance as a band was in March 2005 at The Mint nightclub in Los Angeles, with Armstrong playing bass.

Having briefly gone by the name Epiphany, in mid-2005, the band changed their name to Dead Sara as a reference to the Fleetwood Mac song "Sara" and its lyric "...said Sara"; the band misheard the line as "dead Sara". Both Armstrong and Medley have publicly cited Stevie Nicks, the singer and writer of the song "Sara", as a primary influence. Around this time, Medley began styling her first name as "Siouxsie", as a nod to the Sioux Indians tribe and the Native American heritage of one of her great-grandparents (rather than a reference to the musical artist Siouxsie Sioux).

In 2007, Dead Sara began their first tour as the opening act for Endless Hallway. They released the six-song EP The Airport Sessions on Viscount Records in 2008. After numerous changes to the drummer and bass player positions, the band's line-up finally coalesced in 2009 with Sean Friday on drums and Chris Null on bass, both of whom previously played with Sonny Moore (currently known as Skrillex). In 2009, Armstrong was commissioned by Hole frontwoman Courtney Love to sing backing vocals on Love's 2010 album Nobody's Daughter. In 2011, when singer Grace Slick was asked by The Wall Street Journal which contemporary female singers she admires, Slick named Armstrong. In 2010, the band started their own label, Pocket Kid Records, set up as a subsidiary of Interact-TV, Inc. and owned by Armstrong and Medley.

=== Radio notice and debut album (2011–2013) ===
Radio stations KYSR-FM, KTBZ-FM, and WCCC are credited with initially breaking Dead Sara on the radio. WCCC's Mike Karolyi was in California at the Sunset Sessions convention where Staind was also premiering their documentary. However, overhearing Dead Sara, he skipped the event and checked them out instead. When he returned to Connecticut he played the band's single "Weatherman", giving the group greater exposure. The song, which had not been officially released, ranked No. 2 on WCCC's Top 69 for the year 2011. In September 2011, the band went on tour with Bush, and in February 2012 the band released "Weatherman" as the lead single for their upcoming debut album.

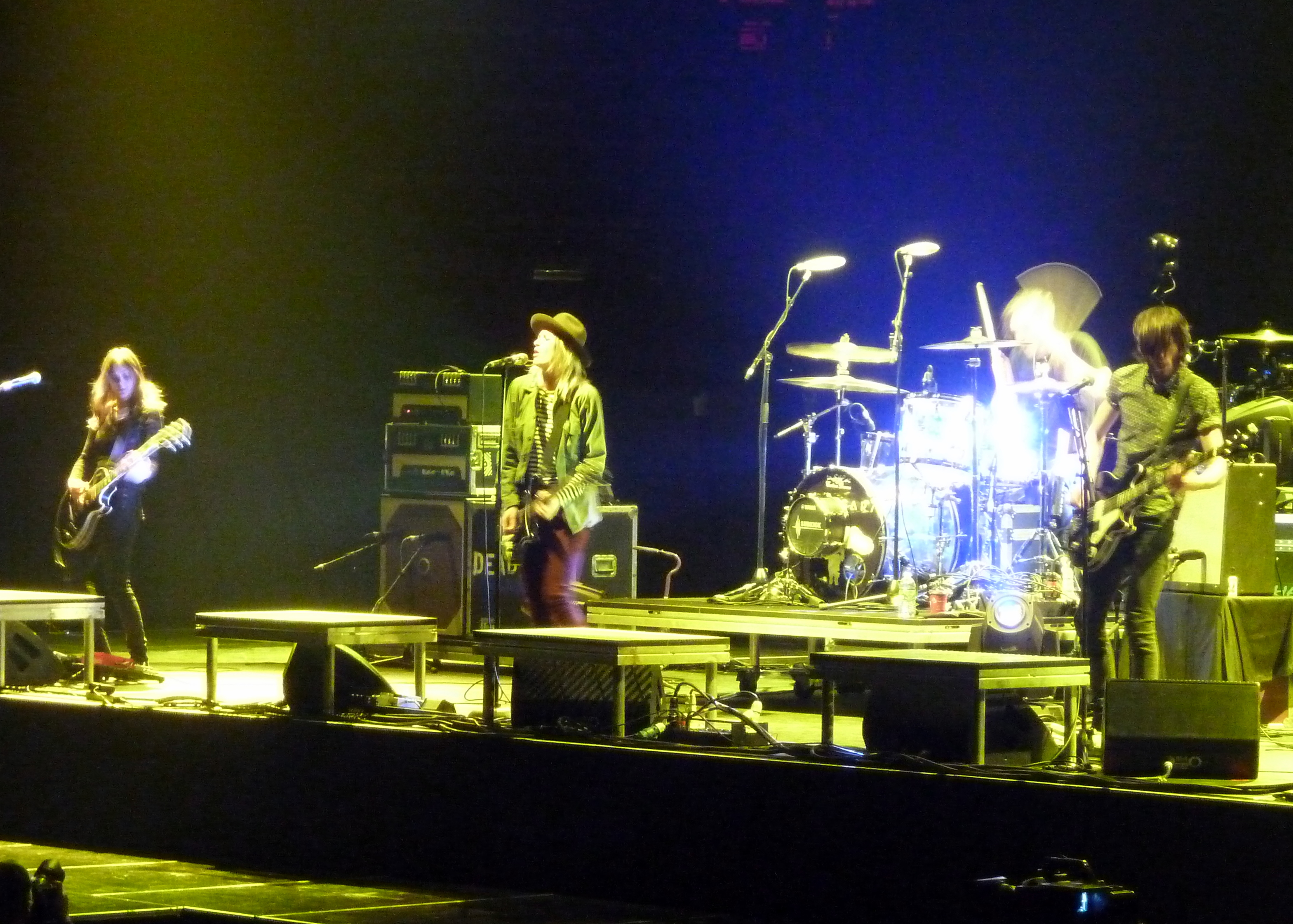
Dead Sara at the Joe Louis Arena in 2013

In April 2012, the band released their debut eponymous album through their label Pocket Kid Records, produced by Noah Shain. The album peaked at No. 16 on Billboard's Heatseekers Albums chart. Soon after, "Weatherman" was used by Fiat in their "Fiat 500 Abarth Burning Up the Desert" advertisement. Dead Sara received the "Best New Rock Group" award at the third annual Vegas Rocks! Magazine Music Awards 2012 on August 26, 2012. They were also nominated for a Radio Contraband Rock Radio Award as Indie Artist of the Year in 2012, and were voted the 98.7 FM 2012 Close to Home Artist of the Year, defeating No Doubt in the final round. "Weatherman" topped the Loudwire "10 Best Rock Songs of 2012" list, beating several major bands including Three Days Grace, Stone Sour, and Deftones. Both Armstrong and Medley were nominated as top ten finalists in the Loudwire 2012 top vocalist and top guitarist awards respectively. Additionally, Armstrong was nominated for the Loudwire 2012 Rock Goddess of the Year award.

After performing spring dates with Chevelle and The Used, the band spent the summer of 2012 touring as part of the Vans Warped Tour in the US. During the 2012 Sunset Strip Music Festival, Emily Armstrong performed "Soul Kitchen" with Robby Krieger and Ray Manzarek of The Doors. In fall 2012, the band toured with The Offspring and Neon Trees, and in February 2013 the band began touring with Muse.

The music video for the song "Lemon Scent", conceived and directed by Reg B., was the band's first scripted video, featuring members of the band fighting each other and audience members in a private boxing match. The video debuted on Rolling Stone's website on March 14, 2013. It was filmed at Serenity West Recording Studio in Los Angeles, California. The extras making up the crowd were fans who volunteered their time after the band posted about the shoot on their official website and Facebook page. Dead Sara signed with Epic Records in 2013.

=== Label issues and Pleasure to Meet You (2014–2020) ===
The band went into the studio at the beginning of 2014 to work on their second album, once again with producer Noah Shain. The record did not see the light of day until the following year due to alleged issues with Epic Records. The band and the label parted ways sometime in 2014.

In December 2014, Dead Sara announced that they would be releasing their second album, Pleasure to Meet You, in March 2015, on their own Pocket Kid Records label. The band also announced they would be using PledgeMusic for those who wanted to pre-order the album. One track, "Suicidal", was given as a free download for contributors to the PledgeMusic campaign. The album's release was followed by a short headlining tour, after which bassist Chris Null left the band.

In 2015, Dead Sara's cover of Nirvana's "Heart-Shaped Box", recorded for Infamous Second Son, won the award for "Best Song, Original or Adapted" at the National Academy of Video Game Trade Reviewers (NAVGTR) annual awards program. In another trailer for Infamous: Second Son, their own song "Weatherman" was also used. Dead Sara signed with Atlantic Records in 2017. The six-song EP Temporary Things Taking Up Space was released on June 8, 2018.

=== Ain't It Tragic and limited activity (2020–present) ===
In November 2020, the band released the song "Hands Up". Their third full-length album, Ain't It Tragic, was released on September 17, 2021.

In 2022, the group worked on tracks "Bones" and was featured on "Help Me" from Demi Lovato's eighth studio album, Holy Fvck. They also joined the singer's concert tour Holy Fvck Tour supporting the album during the North America leg. The band has not released any new work after vocalist Emily Armstrong joined the band Linkin Park as their co-lead vocalist in 2024, and performed in her first concert with the band on September 5, 2024.

== Media appearances ==
Dead Sara made their debut television appearance on Jimmy Kimmel Live! on June 7, 2012, performing their single "Weatherman" and "Sorry for It All". Dead Sara was featured on FUSE NEWS on March 20, 2013, during which Dave Grohl commented that "Dead Sara should be the next biggest rock band in the world." Dead Sara appeared on The Vampire Diaries on March 21, 2013, performing the songs "Ask the Angels" by Patti Smith and their own "Lemon Scent". Also in 2013, "Weatherman" was used in Banshee as ending of the second episode of the first season. Dead Sara performed "Something Good" and "Mona Lisa" from their second album, Pleasure to Meet You, on Late Night with Seth Meyers on April 1, 2015.

== Members ==
Current

- Emily Armstrong – lead vocals, rhythm guitar (2002–present)
- Siouxsie Medley – lead guitar, backing vocals (2002–present)
- Sean Friday – drums, percussion (2005–present)

Former

- Chris Null – bass, backing vocals (2005–2016)

Touring

- Alyssa Davey – bass, backing vocals (2017–present)

== Discography ==
=== Albums ===
Title	Album details	Peak chart positions				
Title	Album details	US Heat.	US Hard Rock	US Indie	US Alt.	US Top Rock
Dead Sara	Released: April 10, 2012; Label: Pocket Kid; Formats: CD, DL	16	—	—	—	—
Pleasure to Meet You	Released: March 31, 2015; Label: INgrooves Music Group, Pocket Kid; Formats: CD, DL, LP	2	7	17	19	33
Ain't It Tragic	Released: September 17, 2021; Label: Warner; Formats: CD, DL, LP	—	—	—	—	—

=== Extended plays ===
Year	EP details	Peak chart positions
Year	EP details	US Heat.
2008	The Airport Sessions	—
2016	The Airport Sessions (Remastered)	—
2017	The Covers	—
2018	Temporary Things Taking Up Space	23

=== Singles ===
Title	Year	Peak chart positions			Album
Title	Year	US Main. Rock	US Alt.	US Rock	Album
"Sorry for It All"	2011	—	—	—	Dead Sara
"Weatherman"	2012	30	35	31	Dead Sara
"We Are What You Say"	2012	—	—	—	Dead Sara
"Lemon Scent"	2013	—	—	—	Dead Sara
"Suicidal"	2014	—	—	—	Pleasure to Meet You
"Mona Lisa"	2015	—	—	—	Pleasure to Meet You
"Something Good"	2015	—	—	—	Pleasure to Meet You
"Unamerican"	2018	—	—	—	Temporary Things Taking Up Space
"Heaven's Got a Back Door"	2018	—	—	—	Temporary Things Taking Up Space
"Anybody"	2018	—	—	—	Temporary Things Taking Up Space
"Hands Up"	2020	—	—	—	Ain't It Tragic
"Heroes"	2021	32	—	—	Ain't It Tragic
"Violent"	2023	—	—	—	Non-album single
