= Beverley Folk Festival =

Festival in Beverley, Yorkshire, England

Coordinates: 53°50′41″N 0°27′24″W

- Status: Active
- Genre: Music festival
- Frequency: Annually (second weekend of June)
- Locations: Beverley, England
- Years active: 41–42 years
- Most recent: 20-22 June 2025
- Next event: 19-21 June 2026
- Website: www.beverleyfolk.com

The Beverley Folk Festival is a three-day celebration of folk music, art, comedy and spoken word held in Beverley, East Riding of Yorkshire, England. It was first organised in 1983 by the White Horse Folk Club and grew considerably over thirty years, being located both at Beverley Leisure Centre and at local venues in the town. In 2013, it moved to Beverley Racecourse and ran until 2018 when it fell into liquidation, resulting in a smaller programme of events being hosted in the town as Beverley Fringe Festival that year. In 2022, it returned as the Beverley Folk Festival.

== History ==
Beverley has a local music scene with a focus on acoustic and folk, linked to its annual folk festival.

Established in 1983, the festival was originally organised by the White Horse Folk Club. Over the years it grew steadily in size and became based at Beverley Leisure Centre, with the venue hosting the main stage, with further music and craft tents on the adjacent site along with the campsite. Nearby pubs in the town including the Sun Inn and Tiger Inn also hosted live music, and the town centre various fringe events. Songwriter and radio broadcaster Mike Harding, and playwright and dramatist John Godber are among the festival patrons.

Past line-ups have ranged from folk legends such as The Watersons, Steeleye Span, Oysterband, Ralph McTell, Lindisfarne, and the Peatbog Faeries, to Billy Bragg, Barbara Dickson and The Proclaimers. Contemporary performers have included Levellers, Chumbawamba, Seth Lakeman, Bellowhead, Eliza Carthy and Blackbeard's Tea Party. Outside the realms of mainstream folk music, headliners have ranged from Joe Brown to Paul Carrack.

The festival was run on a not-for-profit basis and managed by a board of volunteer directors with volunteers involved across all areas of the festival.

== Racecourse (2013–2018) ==
In 2013, the festival moved to Beverley Racecourse and expanded during the next five years. The Racecourse site included: The Festival Village (food and craft stalls and open-air performances), Main Stage Marquee (The Big Top) (large marquee hosting festival headliners, with a capacity of over 1000), Concert Marquee (The Little Top) (smaller marquee showcasing new and old artists), The Atom (venue hosting the Late Night and Moonbeams Sessions, beer tent and improvised music), The Racecourse Rooms (main Grandstand function rooms/bars hosting talks, open music sessions, The Westwood Sessions and comedy, drama and talks), and Children’s Marquee (running arts, crafts and music for children). Alongside the Racecourse site continued the Fringe Festival, in and around Beverley Market Place and pubs.

In April 2018, it was suddenly announced that the years festival would be cancelled, citing the loss of its primary source of funding as the reason for its cancellation. The company was placed into immediate voluntary liquidation.

== Fringe festival (2018) ==
Within hours of the news emerging of the cancellation of the 2018 festival, organisers involved in Fringe Festival events announced their intention to host an enlarged fringe to fill the void.

Reflecting very much the festival origins and roots, a reformed and expanded Fringe Festival ran over the planned three days with performances at venues including The Tiger, Sun Inn and Monks Walk public houses, Memorial Hall, East Riding Theatre, as well in and around the town centre.

== Return of the folk festival (2022-) ==
The festival returned in 2022 with performances at venues across the town including St Mary's Church, East Riding Theatre, Memorial Hall, The Sun Inn, The Monks Walk, St Nicholas Church, and the streets of Beverley. Headline acts have included The Trials of Cato, The Brothers Gillespie, Iona Lane, Henry Parker, and Stornoway.
