= Jessica Carvo =

American singer/songwriter

- Born: Farmingdale, New York
- Genres: Electro-Rock; Synthpop; Indie; Alternative; Classical; A Capella
- Occupations: Vocalist; Songwriter
- Website: www.jessicacarvo.com

Jessica Carvo is a vocalist, songwriter and producer. She is known for being 1/2 of the electro-rock duo Satellite Mode, as well as for performing as a member of Bell'Aria, the Deltones on NBC's The Sing-Off, and for her solo music career.

== Early life ==
Carvo grew up in Farmingdale, NY. Her affinity and talent for music were noticed at a young age. At eight years old, Carvo began taking vocal and piano lessons. She continued on to avidly participate in school musicals at Farmingdale High School.

After high school graduation, Carvo attended the University of Delaware, where she studied communications and music. She spent her free time performing with the Deltones, a collegiate a cappella group, and grew her artistry by learning to compose, arrange, and record music.

During the Fall of 2009, Carvo discovered that she had cysts in her throat. Doctors warned that surgery could take away her singing voice, but fortunately the surgery to remove the cysts was successful. However, the prospect of losing her voice, as well as the recovery period after the surgery, turned her towards discovering her affinity for songwriting.

== Bell'Aria ==
In February 2010, Carvo attended an audition looking for Italian-American singers. After beating out thousands of other singers, Carvo became a member of Bell'Aria, a vocal quintet paying homage to Italian music.

Shortly after forming, Bell'Aria began recording their first album, as well as preparing for live performances. The group's first public performance was at The Venetian in Las Vegas in August 2010. This performance was also recorded for a PBS special. Bell'Aria released their debut album Little Italy on November 23, 2010, on EMI's Manhattan Records, featuring twelve tracks of Italian classics.

== The Sing-Off ==
In 2011, Carvo was asked to return to perform with her college a cappella group the Deltones. The Deltones were chosen to compete on NBC's a cappella competition show The Sing-Off. Carvo, along with nine other alumni of the group and five current University of Delaware students, competed in the competition show against other a cappella groups.

The Deltones were eliminated during the 'Guilty Pleasures Week' on the show. They were the eighth team eliminated of the season.

== Satellite Mode ==
In November 2015, Carvo formed the electro-rock duo Satellite Mode, alongside instrumentalist and producer Alex Marko. Their first single "Wild Excuses" was met with high praise, including the #5 spot on Spotify's US Top 50 Viral Songs playlist.

Following their initial success, Carvo and Marko continued releasing new music. Satellite Mode has racked up over 20 million streams across multiple platforms, and their tracks have received positive reviews from outlets such as Noisey and PopDust. The duo has also had the opportunity to tour the New York City area as well as nationally, supporting bands such as The Band Perry, Shoffy, Guster, and RKCB.

Satellite Mode has also written and recorded with other artists, writers, and producers. The band's songs "Terrified" and "Your Lungs" were co-written with S. Holden Jaffe, and "Kissing in Photographs" was co-written with Coyle Girelli. In addition, the band released "Gave It All 2.0" with artist and activist Xiutezcatl.

Satellite Mode's song "Terrified" was featured on the MTV Movie Awards, and their track "Bad Woman" was included on season one, episode seven of Freeform's Good Trouble.

== Solo projects ==
Carvo has recorded and performed on a number of projects as a solo artist. In 2014, Carvo released "Nightfall", a five-song single. This folk-based release received praise for its catchy and well-written lyrics.

Carvo has released multiple singles since 2014. Many of her solo releases include collaborations with VonLichten of E.S. Posthumus and Les Friction. In 2018, Carvo and VonLichten released "Joyeux", a 3-song Christmas single. In addition, the duo released "Bring It on Home to Me" in 2019, a cover of "Don't Stop Believin'" in 2020, and "America the Beautiful", also in 2020.

Carvo's most recent solo release was a 2020 cover of "Wonderful Christmastime" alongside Matt Cusson.

Carvo has had many of her songs featured on television. Her track "In The Air Tonight" was featured in the 2017 NCAA National Championship trailer. In addition, Carvo's rendition of "Have Yourself a Merry Little Christmas" was used in Freeform's TV movie No Sleep Til Christmas. She also had her cover of "Don't Stop Believin'" used in the 2020 AFC Championship Game trailer on CBS.

Carvo has also had many impressive performance opportunities as a solo artist. For example, in 2012 she had the opportunity to open for Marc Broussard and Andy Suzuki & The Method at the Highline Ballroom in New York City. She has also performed on many other well-known New York City stages, such as at Cafe Wha and B.B. Kings Blues Club. She has also worked and performed with the 52nd Street Project.
