= Borderland (The Chevin album) =

Studio album by The Chevin
- Released: 25 September 2012
- Genre: Alternative rock, indie rock
- Label: So Recordings
- Producer: Noah Shain

The Chevin chronology
Champion EP (2011)	Borderland (2012)

Singles from Borderland
- 1. "Champion" Released: 7 August 2012

Professional ratings
Review scores
Source	Rating
Allmusic	7.3/10 stars
Contact Music	4/5 stars
Stereoboard	4/5 stars
AltSounds	66%

Borderland is the debut studio album by English alternative band The Chevin, released on 25 September 2012.

== Track listing ==
All songs written by Coyle Girelli, except where noted.

No.	Title	Length
1.	"Champion" (Coyle Girelli, Mat Steel, Jon Langford, Mal Taylor, Mark Heaton)	3:46
2.	"Drive"	4:00
3.	"Blue Eyes"	3:17
4.	"Dirty Little Secret"	4:14
5.	"Love Is Just a Game"	5:09
6.	"Borderland"	4:23
7.	"Beautiful World"	4:14
8.	"Gospel" (Coyle Girelli, Jon Langford)	3:59
9.	"Colours"	4:00
10.	"So Long Summer" (Coyle Girelli, Andrew Hollander)	4:39

Deluxe Version bonus tracks
No.	Title	Length
11.	"Songs for the Sun"	1:26
12.	"Menwith Hill"	4:56
13.	"When the Party's Over"	4:14

== Personnel ==
=== The Chevin ===
- Coyle Girelli - vocals, guitar, keyboards, organ, piano, programming, string arrangement
- Jon Langford - bass
- Mat Steel - guitar, keyboards, mandolin, organ
- Mal Taylor - drums, percussion

=== Additional personnel ===
- Anna Bulbrook - violin
- Manuel Calderock - engineering
- Cesar Camarena - cello
- Vanessa Cedillos - violin
- Mark Heaton - guitar, piano
- Noah Shain - producer, mixer, engineering
