= Blackbeard's Tea Party =

British folk rock band

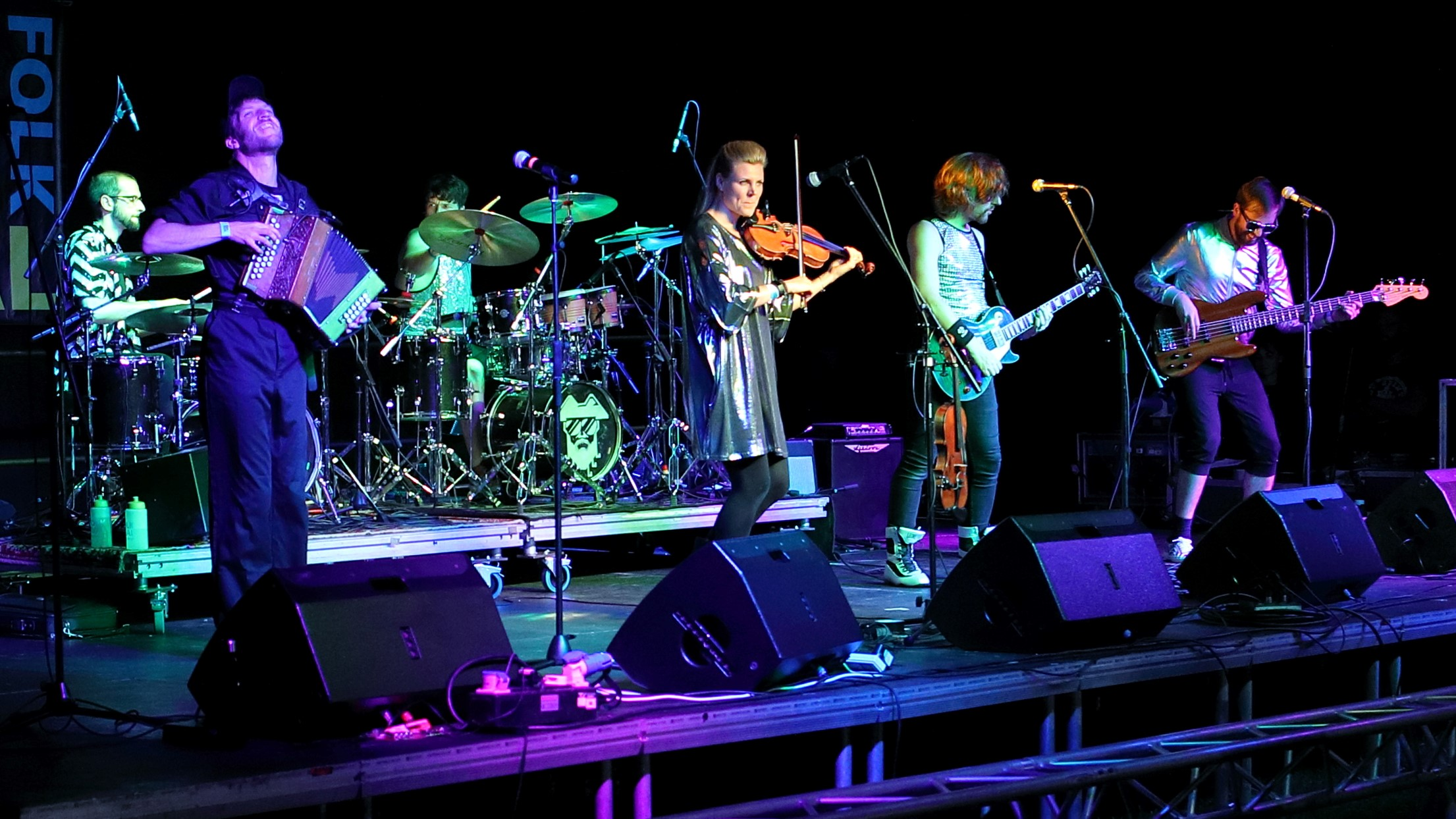
- Blackbeard's Tea Party at Ely Festival 2021 (Yom, Stuart, Dave, Laura, Benjamin, Paddy)

Background information
- Origin: York, England
- Genres: British folk rock, tech folk
- Years active: 2009–present
- Labels: BigD Promotions, Proper Music Distribution
- Members: Laura Boston-Barber; Dave Boston; Paddy Lester-Rourke; Benjamin Trott; Amy Kakoura
- Past members: Paul Young; Martin Coumbe; Tim Yates; Liam 'Yom' Hardy; Stuart Giddens
- Website: www.blackbeardsteaparty.com

Blackbeard's Tea Party are a contemporary folk rock band based in York, England. The five-piece band plays a mix of traditional folk songs as well as covers of more recent songs from the folk genre. They are also known for their instrumental arrangements of traditional and modern folk tunes, as well as self-penned material. Blackbeard's Tea Party function as both a concert and ceilidh band and have become well known on the English festival circuit, having performed at mainstream festivals including the Glastonbury Festival, Larmer Tree Festival & Bingley Music Live, as well as folk festivals such as Fairport's Cropredy Convention, Towersey Festival and the Cambridge, Bromyard, Shrewsbury & Sidmouth folk festivals.

== History ==
=== Early years and Heavens To Betsy: 2009-2011 ===
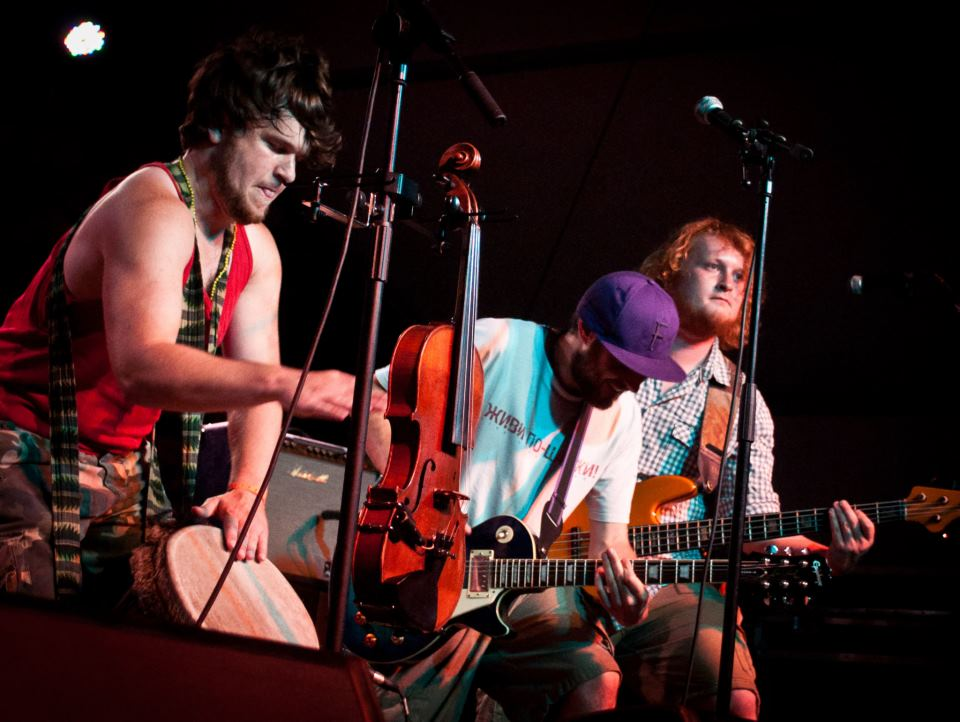
Dave Boston, Martin Coumbe and Tim Yates in 2013

The band originally formed after Paul Young and Laura Barber decided to put together a ceilidh and busking band in order to make money to supplement their income. The other members were asked to join and were either friends from University or previous bandmates from other bands.

Their first act was to record the EP Heavens To Betsy as promotional material to send to ceilidh clubs and festivals. In order to fill space on the EP four songs that has been loosely arranged beforehand by Paul, Martin, Tim and Yom were added. This led to Blackbeard's Tea Party performing as a concert band as well as a ceilidh band.

The EP was released on 27 November by the band with a gig at the Melbourne Pub in York. In the months that followed the band promoted it heavily by busking, playing concerts and festival appearances in 2010 at Beverley Folk Festival and Galtres Festival. The track "High Barbary" was played on Mike Harding's Folk Show on BBC Radio 2. The EP received a small amount of critical praise, gaining a positive review in R2 Magazine

=== Tomorrow We'll Be Sober: 2011-2013 ===
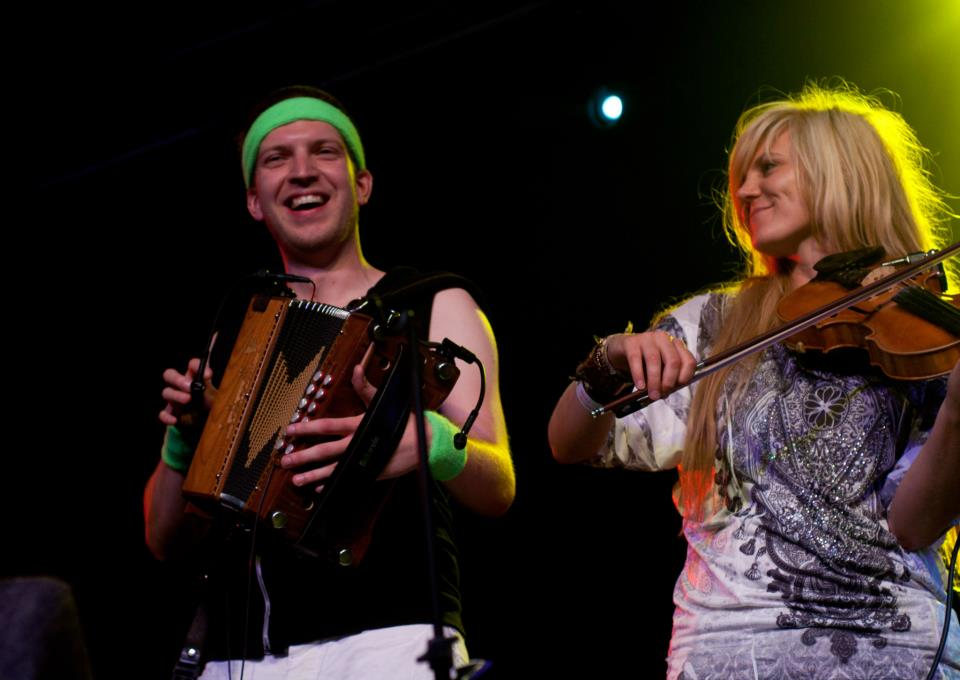
Stuart Giddens and Laura Barber in 2013

Throughout 2011 Blackbeard's Tea Party cemented their reputation as a formidable festival act with performances at Sidmouth, Shrewsbury, Galtres, Beverley Folk Festival as well as appearances at numerous smaller festivals.

Throughout this period they were also busy recording their debut album Tomorrow We'll be Sober. It was produced by the band's bassist Tim Yates and like Heavens To Betsy was self-released with no professional backing. The band released the album on 22 October 2011 at a gig at The Duchess venue in their home town of York. The album was critically received well with positive reviews in numerous Folk magazines and websites including a 5-star review in R2.

Shortly after the release of Tomorrow We'll Be Sober, Paul Young left the band and was replaced by Stuart Giddens.

2012 involved another prolific festival run for the band, with repeat performances at Sidmouth and Shrewsbury as well as a successful appearance at Cambridge Folk Festival and many others.

=== Whip Jamboree: 2013-2014 ===
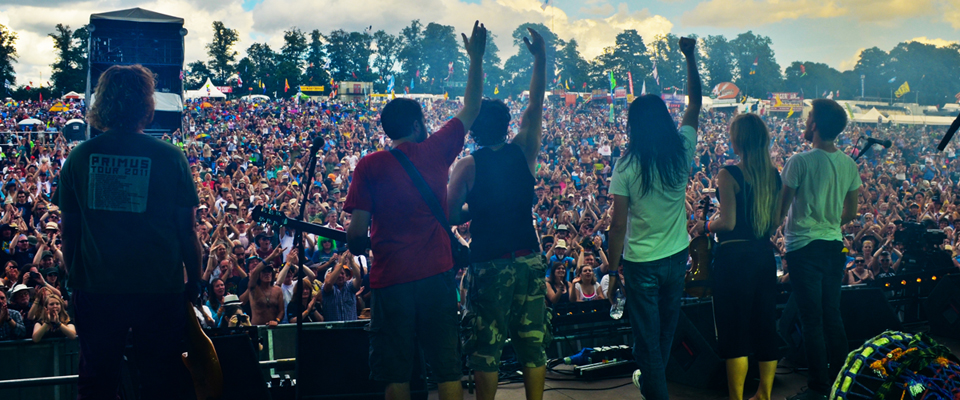
At Fairport's Cropredy Convention 2014

On 7 November 2012, Blackbeard's Tea Party posted a photo of Yom's Cajon in a recording studio on their Facebook page. Shortly after they revealed that work on their next album had begun. It was released on 8 April 2013, followed by the band's first UK headline tour. Initial response to the album has been positive, with the song "The Valiant Turpin" receiving airplay on numerous BBC Radio Shows as well as Mike Harding's podcast.

They continued to tour the album throughout 2013 and the early part of 2014, before embarking on their biggest run of festivals to date, with 20 performances over the summer. During this festival season, the band made their first overseas appearances, with performances at the Costa Del Folk Festival in Spain, and the Rainforest World Music Festival in Sarawak, Borneo. This summer also saw them reaching out to a wider fan-base with shows at large festivals including the Glastonbury Festival and Fairport's Cropredy Convention (where they played to a sell out audience of 20,000 people).

=== Reprobates & Leviathan!: 2015-2020 ===
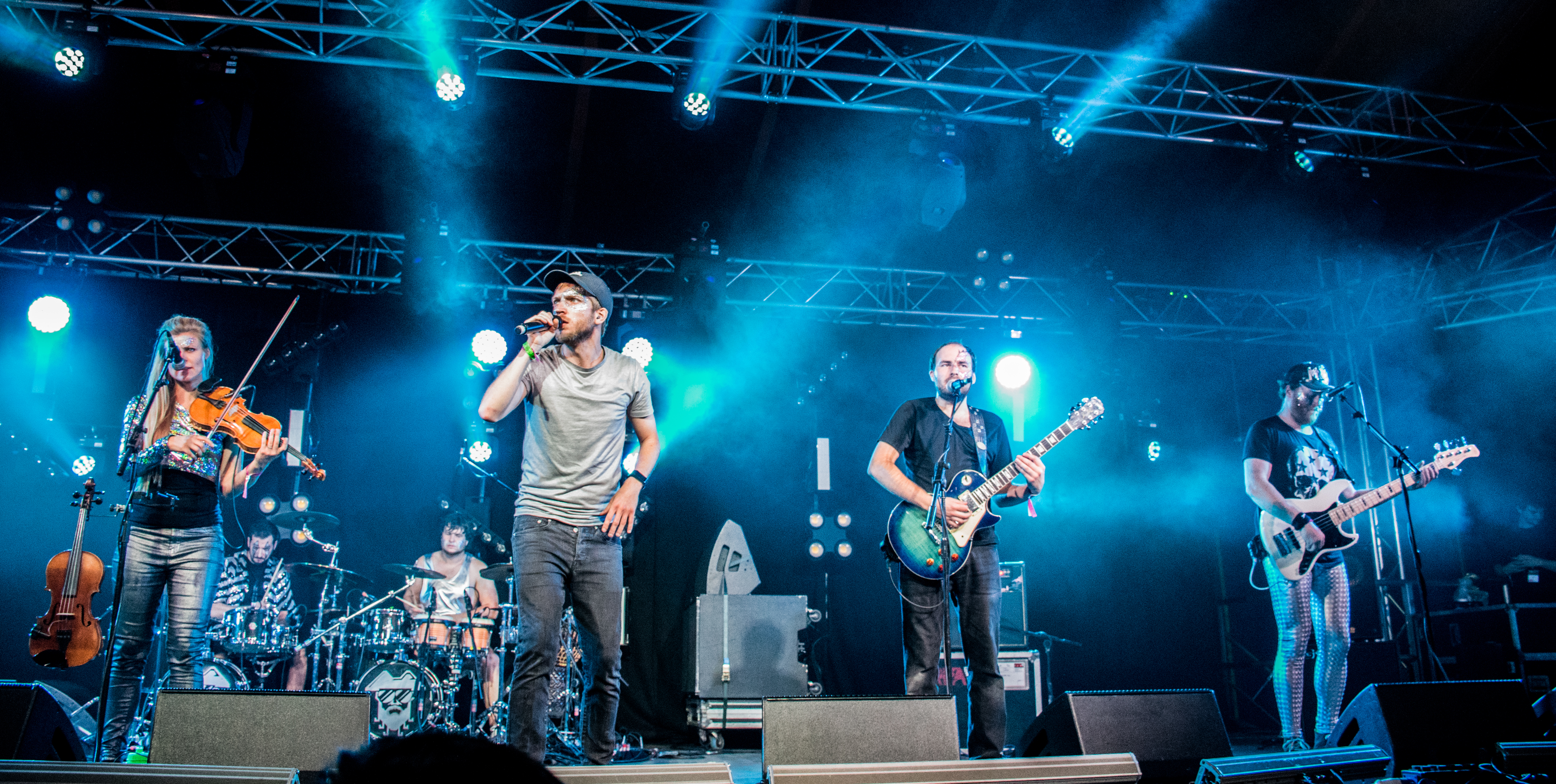
Closing concert at Towersey Festival 2018 (Laura, Yom, Dave, Stuart, Martin, Tim)

Blackbeard's Tea Party released their third album Reprobates on 9 October 2015. The seven songs on the album were thematically linked - telling stories of nefarious, rebellious or villainous characters. The album was well received by fans and critics, and received radio play including on the BBC Radio 2 Folk Show.

After touring the Reprobates album throughout 2015 and 2016, Blackbeard's Tea Party significantly beefed up their sound by introducing two full drum-kits (as opposed to hand-percussion) for the first time. This new sound was captured on the EP Leviathan!, released on 13 April 2018. The EP featured songs documenting the whaling industry.

The introduction of two drum-kits was not well received by some folk music fans. After appearing at Towersey Festival for the second time in 2017, they were invited back to play the main stage 'finale' in 2018. Talking to the festival in 2017, Stuart discussed the band and their relationship with the wider folk scene, saying: "We have always been on the 'naughty step' of folk music."

=== Line-up changes, Kick the Curb and We Are People: 2020-present ===
In March 2020, Tim Yates and Martin Coumbe left the band in amicable circumstances. They were replaced by Paddy Lester-Rourke on bass and Benjamin Trott on guitar. Throughout the COVID-19 pandemic the band collaborated virtually, writing new material which would eventually become the album Kick the Curb, released on 30 September 2022.

The album was warmly received by fans and critics, as were live appearances at festivals in the summer of 2022 including Gate to Southwell Festival and Folk on the Farm. The band experienced a successful headline tour in the autumn and winter of 2022 with many sell-out shows. At the end of 2022, Liam Hardy left the band (again, in amicable circumstances).

In March 2024 the band announced their 7th album, We Are People, to be released in September 2024.

== Band members ==
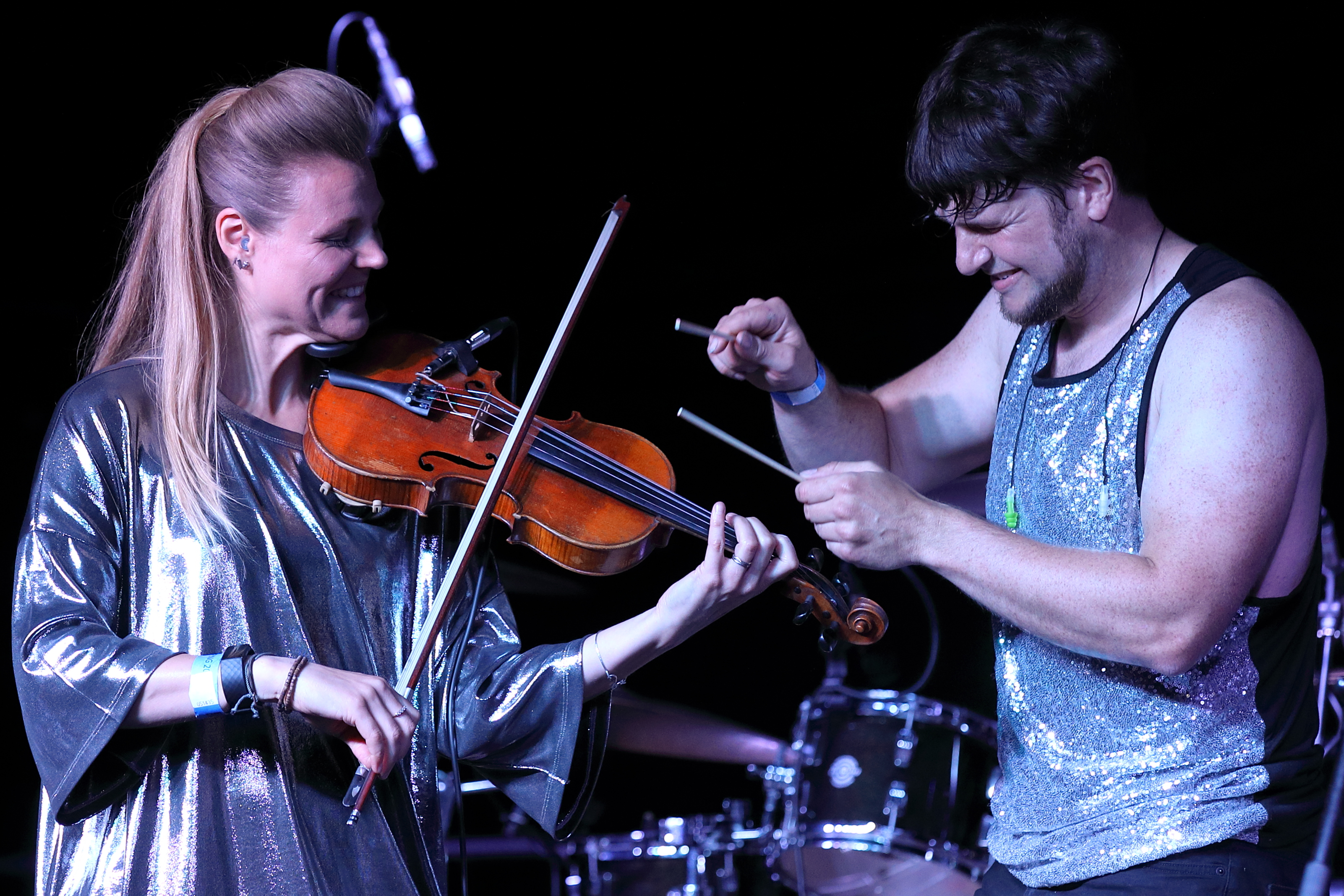
Laura-Boston Barber and Dave Boston

=== Current members ===
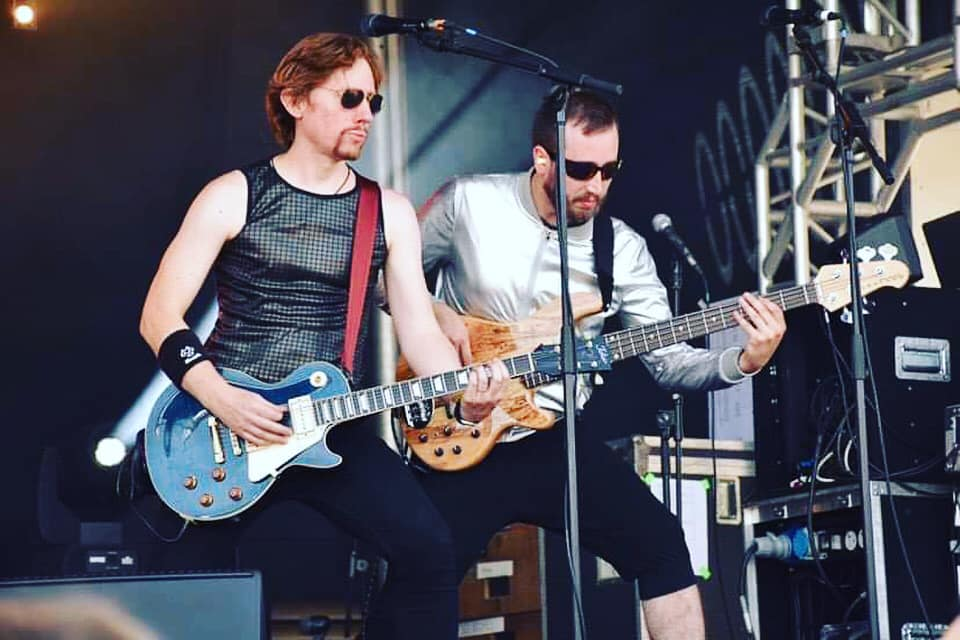
Benjamin Trott and Paddy Lester-Rourke

- Laura Boston-Barber (2009–present) – Fiddle
- Dave Boston (2009–present) – Percussion
- Paddy Lester-Rourke (2021–present) - Electric Bass
- Benjamin Trott (2021–present) - Electric guitar
- Amy Kakoura (2026–present) Lead vocals

=== Past members ===
- Paul Young (2009–2011) – Lead Vocals, Melodeon, Acoustic Guitar
- Martin Coumbe (2009–2021) – Electric guitar
- Tim Yates (2009–2021) – Electric Bass, Double Bass
- Liam 'Yom' Hardy (2009–2022) – Cajon, Cymbals, Percussion
- Stuart Giddens (2011–2026) – Lead Vocals, Melodeon

== Discography ==
=== Albums ===
- Tomorrow We’ll Be Sober (2011)
- Whip Jamboree (2013)
- Reprobates (2015)
- Kick The Curb (2022)
- We Are People (2024)

=== EPs ===
- Heavens To Betsy (2009)
- Leviathan! (2018)
