= The Chevin (band) =

English post-punk revival band

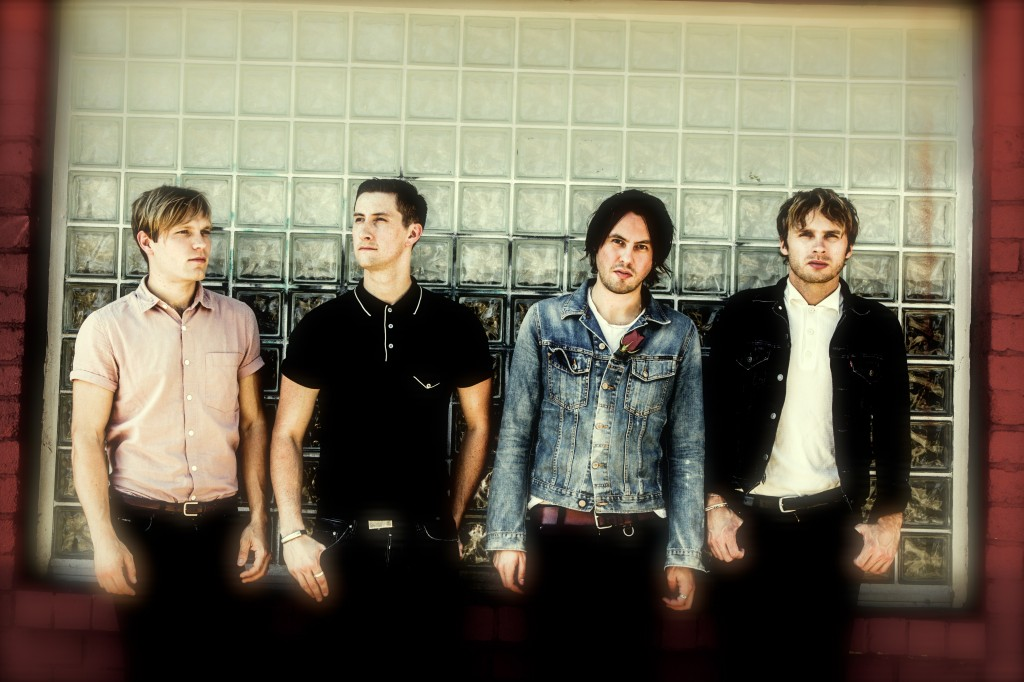

Background information
- Origin: Otley, Leeds, England
- Genres: Post-punk revival; indie rock; indie pop
- Years active: 2010–present
- Labels: So; Fierce Panda; Sony Music Germany
- Spinoff of: Your Vegas, Coyle Girelli
- Members: Coyle Girelli; Jon Langford; Mat Steel; Mal Taylor

The Chevin are an English post-punk revival band, based in Leeds who formed in 2010 by Your Vegas members and childhood friends, Coyle Girelli (lead vocals and guitars), Mat Steel (guitars and keyboards), Jon Langford (bass guitar) and Mal Taylor (drums). The band took their name from The Chevin, a ridge overlooking their home town of Otley, West Yorkshire.

== History ==
=== Formation ===
Singer and songwriter Coyle Girelli and guitarist Mat Steel have been playing music together since the age of 12. All four band members met in school while growing up in the small West Yorkshire town of Otley.

=== Champion EP (2011–2012) ===
The Chevin's debut five-track EP was released on 31 October 2011 on Fierce Panda Records produced by Coyle Girelli. The lead track "Champion" was playlisted at XFM London, XFM Manchester, BBC 6 Music, and was supported by many UK DJs including Steve Lamacq.

In November, 2011, The Chevin supported the UK Tour for The Airborne Toxic Event. At a sold out Shepherd's Bush Empire show, So Recordings' owner and president saw the band perform. The band signed to So Recordings weeks later. The Chevin supported The Pigeon Detectives during the second half of November across Europe. In December the band supported White Lies, ending the tour at Wembley Arena.

Notorious music critic Neil McCormick of The Telegraph described the band as "old-fashioned, OTT and big enough to crush all resistance." UK Magazine Artrocker nominated The Chevin as one of the Best New Bands of 2011.

=== Borderland (2012–present) ===
In 2011 The Chevin moved to Sonic Ranch, a recording studio complex 30 miles east of El Paso, Texas, USA. For three weeks, The Chevin recorded and mixed their debut album Borderland with producer Noah Shain.

The Chevin debuted in the United States at the 2012 SXSW Music Festival, in Austin, Texas.

In May 2012, The Chevin performed at Live at Leeds, Camden Crawl and The Great Escape Festival, while ending the month supporting European dates for Franz Ferdinand.

The band's debut single on So Recordings, "Drive" was released on 28 May. Major support from UK Radio continued along with stadium play around the country during football and rugby matches. The Chevin's second single "Blue Eyes" was released on 23 July and garnered surprising support from BBC Radio 2. The band were guests on Dermot O'Leary's Radio 2 show. The Blue Eyes video featured many shots of band's home town of Otley.

So Recordings released The Champion EP on 28 August in the United States. The next day, The Chevin made their US Television debut, performing "Champion" on the Late Show with David Letterman. Three days later, the band performed at the Bingley Music Live festival.

The Chevin released their debut album Borderland in the US on 25 September 2012 and then two days later performed "Champion" on the Conan talk show. iTunes celebrated the release of the album by making "Champion" the US iTunes Store "Single Of The Week" where it received over 1/4 of a million downloads in one week.

The Huffington Post featured 2 songs from Borderland ('Champion' and 'Love Is Just A Game') in its Top 52 Songs Of 2012 List. South Africa's largest national rock radio station 5FM playlisted "Champion".

The Chevin performed at the Firefly Music Festival on 23 June 2013.

In 2019 The Chevin released new singles "Under The Thunder" on 21 August and "Big Machine" on 16 October, and performed shows in New York City at legendary venue Mercury Lounge.

== Use in other media ==
"Champion" is featured on the football simulation game, FIFA 13's soundtrack. The song was also used during ESPN's coverage of the 2012 MLS Cup Playoffs and on the Sky Sports special 'The Magic Of Messi', that focused on Lionel Messi's record breaking year.

Bookmaker William Hill used "Champion" for its 2013 television commercial campaign.

The song "Beautiful World" is featured at the end of the fifteenth episode of season 4 of The Middle when Sue and Darin first kiss. It is used again in the fourteenth episode of season 6 when they break up. The song is also used at the end credits on "Be Here Now", the 2015 feature-length documentary about Andy Whitfield's battle with cancer.

== Other projects ==
Frontman Coyle Girelli began working on a solo project in 2016 and released his debut solo single "Where's My Girl?" on 11 May 2018 ahead of the release of his debut solo album "Love Kills" which is set for a summer 2018 release.

== Discography ==
=== Studio albums ===
Title	Album details
Borderland	Released: 25 September 2012; Label: So Recordings; Formats: CD, Digital download

=== EPs ===
Title	Album details
Champion EP	Released: 31 October 2011 (UK), 28 August 2012 (US); Label: Fierce Panda Records (UK), So Recordings (US); Formats: CD, Digital download

=== Singles ===
- "Drive" (28 May 2012)
- "Blue Eyes" (6 August 2012) - (UK only)
- "Champion" (7 August 2012)
- "Under The Thunder" (21 August 2019)
- "Big Machine" (16 October 2019)
