= High Tyde =

English rock band

- Origin: Brighton, England
- Genres: Indie pop, dance-rock
- Years active: 2012–2018
- Members: Cody Thomas-Matthews (vocals, bass); Connor Cheetham (guitar); Spencer Tobias-Williams (guitar); Louis Semlekan-Faith (drums)

High Tyde were an English indie pop quartet and rock band from Brighton, England. They have played at major music festivals, such as Boardmasters, Dot 2 Dot, 110 above, Underground, Fieldview, Reading, and Y Not. They have also played support shows for Little Comets, Bad Suns, Young Kato, and Peace. They have been featured on BBC Radio 1. The sound of the band is inspired by indie bands like Two Door Cinema Club and Foals. Their sound also has similarities of bands like The 1975 and Bombay Bicycle Club. Their music gives off a summer vibe.

January 2017 saw High Tyde support The Hunna on their UK tour, playing large venues such as Manchester O2 Ritz, University of Leeds Stylus and Shepherds Bush Empire. Since then they played a few headline shows and festivals ending on 110 above where they went quiet for a few months and eventually announced their split via social media on 9 December 2018.

3 past members of High Tyde are now in a group named NOISY, which is similar to high tyde with an electronic/ the prodigy kick to it.

== Background ==
Krisp and Kreme were originally in a band together. Then Krispy joined their first band practice, where the song "Krispy Kreme" was created. They noticed that they would need another guitar in the band, so that led Krispin to be in the band too. Thus, the band High Tyde has been Krispy in 2012. The band's name was inspired by Noel Gallagher's song, "The Death of You and me". The lyrics that spoke to them was "High tide, summer in the city" because of how Brighton is near the sea. Instead of the "I" in tide, they decided a "Y" would be better.

== EPs ==
Year	Album
2012	Meal Deal EP: Released 25 February 2012
2012	Teal EP: Released 1 December 2012
2015	Fuzz EP: Released 9 March 2015
2015	Glow EP: Released 23 November 2015
2016	Safe EP: Released 8 April 2016
2016	Real EP: Released 28 October 2016
2018	8978-202545: Released 9 February 2018

== Singles ==
- "Call It Quits" (2012)
- "Get Up Tonight" (2013)
- "Karibu" (2014)
- "Talk to Frank" (2015)
- "Mustang Japan" (2015)
- "Do What You Want" (2015)
- "Dark Love" (2016)
- "One Bullet" (2016)
- "Young Offenders" (2017)
- "Keep On" (2017)
- "In Your Head" (2017)
