= Temporary Things Taking Up Space =

2018 EP by Dead Sara

EP by Dead Sara
- Released: June 8, 2018
- Length: 21:48
- Label: Atlantic

Dead Sara chronology
Pleasure To Meet You (2015)	Temporary Things Taking Up Space (2018)	Ain't It Tragic (2021)

Singles from Temporary Things Taking Up Space
- 1. "Unamerican" Released: May 4, 2018; 2. "Heaven's Got a Back Door" Released: May 4, 2018; 3. "Anybody" Released: June 7, 2018

Temporary Things Taking Up Space is the third EP by the American rock band Dead Sara, released on June 8, 2018, under their new label Atlantic Records.

== Release ==
The EP was announced on May 4, 2018, along with the release of two singles, "Unamerican" and "Heaven's Got a Back Door".

Professional ratings
Review scores
Source	Rating
Punknews	3.5/5 stars
GENRE IS DEAD!	3.5/5 stars

== Track listing ==
No.	Title	Length
1.	"Times to Remember"	3:19
2.	"Anybody"	4:30
3.	"Unamerican"	3:46
4.	"What It Takes"	3:10
5.	"One Day We'll Make It Big"	3:40
6.	"Heaven's Got a Back Door"	3:23
Total length:		21:48
