= A Town and Two Cities =

Studio album by Your Vegas
- Released: 29 April 2008
- Genre: Alternative rock
- Length: 38:37
- Label: Universal Republic
- Producer: David Bendeth

Your Vegas chronology
A Town and Two Cities EP (2008)	A Town and Two Cities (2008)

Singles from A Town and Two Cities
- 1. "Your Vegas" Released: August 2005 (UK); 2. "In My Head" Released: June 2008 (US)

A Town and Two Cities is the debut album by English alternative rock band Your Vegas. The album was produced by David Bendeth and mixed by Brian Sperber.

== Background ==
The album's title is a reference to the band's home town of Otley, their home city of Leeds and the city in which they were based (at the time of the album's release), New York.

== Release and reception ==
A Town and Two Cities was released digitally in the United States on Universal Republic Records on 1 April 2008 and in stores nationwide on 29 April 2008. The lead single "In My Head" spent 13 weeks at number 1 on Alt Nation. The album was voted number six in Music Under Fire's top 30 albums of 2008. It was well received by critics and music fans alike, with an average rating of five stars on Amazon.com and four-and-a-half stars on iTunes.

== Track listing ==
All tracks are written by Coyle Girelli except where noted.

No.	Title	Length
1.	"It Makes My Heart Break" (Coyle Girelli, David Bendeth)	3:18
2.	"In My Head"	3:38
3.	"Birds Of Paradise"	3:40
4.	"Aurora" (Coyle Girelli, Mat Steel)	3:29
5.	"Troubled Times"	3:35
6.	"The Way The War Was Won" (Coyle Girelli, Andrew Hollander)	4:17
7.	"Your Vegas"	3:36
8.	"Up Until The Lights Go Out"	3:57
9.	"I Wish You Were Somewhere Else"	3:40
10.	"Salvador"	5:30

== Personnel ==
Your Vegas

- Coyle Girelli – vocals, guitar, keys
- Mat Steel – guitar
- Jon Langford – bass guitar
- Mark Heaton – keys, guitar
- Mal Taylor – drums

Production

- David Bendeth – Producer, Percussion
- Dan Korneff – Engineering, Digital Editing
- Jon Bender – Engineering, Digital Editing
- Kato Khandwala – Engineering, Digital Editing, Programming
- John Tomaszewski – Assistant
- Kyle Cadena – Assistant
- Brian Sperber – Mixer
- Noah Goldstein – Mix Assistant
- Charlie Stavish – Mix Assistant
- Tony Gillis – Mastering
