= Live at Leeds (festival) =

Music festival in Leeds, England

- Genre: Rock, indie rock, alternative rock, electronica
- Dates: Weekend of May Day bank holiday
- Locations: Leeds, England
- Years active: 2007–present
- Website: www.liveatleeds.com

Live at Leeds is a music festival that takes place across various venues in Leeds, England, on the weekend of the May Day bank holiday.

The festival began in 2007 to mark the city of Leeds's 800th birthday and was jointly hosted by Leeds City Council and music promotion company Futuresound. This initial event took place at the end of May and featured around 50 bands playing live in and around Leeds city centre along with film screenings and a music industry seminar. The 2008 event took place over the weekend of the May Day bank holiday and featured two concerts by Leeds band The Pigeon Detectives at Millennium Square as its centrepiece. 1990s and White Lies were among the groups who played the 2009 festival, while 2010 saw sets by the likes of Lightspeed Champion, British Sea Power and The Twilight Sad. Live at Leeds 2011 took place at venues including Brudenell Social Club, O2 Academy Leeds and The Cockpit, and was headlined by James Blake, Anna Calvi, The Futureheads, Frightened Rabbit, Pulled Apart by Horses, Young Knives and The Duke Spirit. In January 2012 it was announced that Example, Marina and the Diamonds and The Subways would headline that year's event.

2013, in the seventh year, Live at Leeds will welcome over hundred bands on twelve stages. The annual football tournament returns for its third year along with the Unconference. The event is sponsored by Fosters, Marriott Hotels, Blacks Solicitors with media partners are Hebe and Enjoy digital.

- Live at Leeds was shortlisted for 'Best Metropolitan Festival' for three years (2011, 2012 and 2014).
- Live at Leeds won 'Best Metropolitan Festival' at the UK Festival Awards in 2014

Previous Line-ups for Live at Leeds.

- 2007 – Wild Beasts/Slow Club/Grammatics/Shut Your Eyes/Wintermute/Blackwire
- 2008 – Metronomy/The Dykeenies/The Rascals/This Et Al/Vessels/Pulled Apart By Horses
- 2009 – The Maccabees/Marina and the Diamonds/Mumford and Sons/Bombay Bicycle Club
- 2010 – Ed Sheeran/Everything Everything/Hurts/Darwin Deez/Eliza Doolittle/The Sunshine Underground/65daysofstatic/The Bronx/Lightspeed Champion/Hadouken
- 2011 – Young Knives/Tribes/Aloe Blacc/Anna Calvi/The Futureheads/Dinosaur Pile Up/James Blake/Frightened Rabbit
- 2012 – The Enemy/Ladyhawke/The Subways/Los Campesinos/Ghostpoet/Jake Bugg/Alt-J/Lucy Rose/Lianne La Havas/Jessie Ware/Spector/Scroobius Pip/Savages/ I Like Trains
- 2013 – Everything Everything, AlunaGeorge, Rudimental, Laura Mvula, Pigeon Detectives, Peace, The Staves, Savages + more
- 2014 – Albert Hammond Jr, Catfish and the Bottlemen, Clean Bandit, Courtney Barnett, George Ezra, Royal Blood + more
- 2015 – Carl Barat & the Jackals, Dry the River, Dutch Uncles, Eagulls, Emmy the Great, Gaz Coombes, George the Poet, Hookworms, Lauren Aquilina, Lawson, Lucy Rose, MNEK, Palma Violets, Raleigh Ritchie, Rhodes, Saint Raymond, Slaves, Spector, Stormzy, Stornoway, Sunset Sons, Swim Deep, The Cribs, The Strypes, Thurston Moore Band, We Were Promised Jetpacks & more
