= Siouxsie Medley =

American musician

Susan Mae Elizabeth Medley
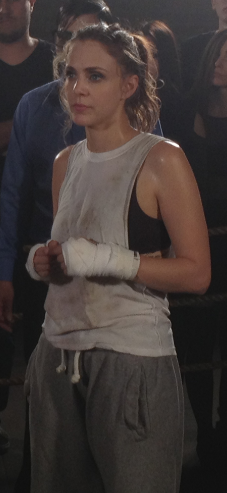
- Medley in 2015

Background information
- Also known as: Siouxsie Medley
- Born: Susan Mae Elizabeth Medley; November 20, 1987 (age 38)
- Origin: Los Angeles, California, U.S.
- Genres: Hard rock; punk blues; post-hardcore
- Occupation: Musician
- Instruments: Guitar
- Years active: 2004–present

Susan Mae Elizabeth Medley, is an American musician, artist, and actress from Los Angeles, California. She is best known as the lead guitarist for Dead Sara, a band she founded with Emily Armstrong in 2005.

== Early years ==
Born in Los Angeles to Stan Medley and Sandra Sherman, Medley was raised by her father after her parents separated. Medley's interest in music began at age 9 when she started practicing on a Fender Telecaster owned by her nanny, Dexy Valentine of the band Magic Wands. She then used two years’ worth of saved allowances to purchase her own guitar, a Fender Squier, at age 11.

Medley started acting at age 12 when she appeared in an international commercial, earning Screen Actors Guild membership as a result. She was pursuing an acting career until she met Emily Armstrong in 2002 and the two began writing songs together.

== Dead Sara ==
Medley and Armstrong first performed live in March 2005 at The Mint nightclub in Los Angeles, under the name Epiphany. Later that year they changed their band's name to Dead Sara as a reference to the Fleetwood Mac song "Sara" and its lyric "...said Sara", sometimes heard as "dead Sara". Armstrong and Medley have cited Stevie Nicks, who wrote "Sara", as a primary influence.

Dead Sara has since released three full-length albums and several EPs, most recently their single Violent in 2023.

== Accolades ==
In 2012, Medley was the only woman among the 10 finalists for the Loudwire rock guitarist of the year award.

Medley composed the artwork for the Dead Sara single "Heart Shaped Box", which Sony Computer Entertainment commissioned for the cover of its Infamous Second Son video game.
