= Black Diamond Bay (UK) =

British band

Black Diamond Bay (UK) is an English independent electronic band formed in 2008, based in Leeds and London. The band consists of Agne Motie, Jesse O'Mahoney, Tom Sidebottom, Ben Ziapour, Ben Wilson and Colin Sutton. They produce and play live in several electronic dance music styles including Slo-Mo House and electronic music.

== History ==
Black Diamond Bay was formed by Jesse O'Mahoney and Tom Sidebottom and was realised fully as a live band in 2006 when they recruited four other band members. In 2010 they signed a recording deal with Exceptional Records, with whom they have released an album, Come The Desert, in March 2011, along with several singles and an EP. The band have a strong Lithuanian following in London. (Agne is Lithuanian) and have received strong support from Alan Raw via the Leeds based BBC Introducing show, which led to them playing at both Reading and Leeds Festivals in 2011, and being added to the BBC Radio 1 playlist rotation.

== Band members ==
- Agne Motie: Vocals
- Jesse O'Mahoney: Vocals, song-writing, composition, co-production
- Tom Sidebottom: Production, composition, keyboard, violin
- Ben Ziapour: Guitar, production, composition
- Ben Wilson: Drums, co-production, composition
- Colin Sutton: Bass Guitar, composition

== Discography ==
=== Studio albums ===
- 14 March 2011: Come The Desert

=== EPs and singles ===
- 5 April 2010: "Worship The Sun" (EP)
- 21 June 2010: "Philharmonic Bubbles" (single)
- 25 October 2010: "Peace" (single)
- 4 July 2011: "I Dreamt We Were Bank Robbers" (single)
- 26 August 2011: "Speak Slow" (single)

== See also ==
- List of bands originating in Leeds
- Music in Leeds
- Bands and musicians from Yorkshire and North East England
