= Noah Shain =

American record producer and musician

- Origin: Los Angeles, California, United States
- Occupations: Record producer, audio engineer, musician
- Instruments: Production, drums
- Website: http://noahshain.com/

Noah Shain is an American record producer and musician. Shain was dubbed "one of the most prominent young producers in the United States” by Mute. He notably produced early work by Grammy Award winning Skrillex "Sonny Moore," as well as albums by As Tall as Lions, Jordan Zevon, Atreyu, The Chevin, and Dead Sara.

Epic Records recording artist Dead Sara stated that Noah was instrumental in making their album sound "As raw as possible." The album has peaked at No. 16 on Billboard's Heatseekers Albums Chart.

== Works as a producer (partial list) ==
Artist	Album	Label	Credit	Year
Badflower	This is how the world ends	Big Machine Records	Producer	2017
Ski Lodge	Big Heart	Dovecoat	Mixer	2013
Goldsboro	Goldsboro	Bandini Mountain Records	Producer, Mixer, Engineer	2013
Escondido	The Ghost of Escondido	Kill Canyon	Mixer	2013
Pip	No Formalities	PIP	Co-Producer, Co-Writer, Mixer	2013
Dead Sara	Dead Sara	Epic/Pocket Kid Records	Producer, Engineer, Mixer	2012
Cody Simpson	"Paradise" - Single	Atlantic Records	Mixer	2012
Vas Defrans	Self-Titled	Vas Defrans	Producer, Engineer, Mixer	2012
Ari Shine	Songs of Solomon	Ari Shine	Producer, Engineer, Mixer	2012
Tess Dunn	Honestly Box	Tess Dun	Producer, Engineer, Mixer	2012
Window View	Northbound-EP	Self-Released	Mixer	2012
Cody Simpson	"Got Me Good" - Single	Atlantic Records	Mixer	2012
Eiza Gonzalez	Te Accordaras De Mi	EMI	Engineer, Mixer	2012
Sean Bones	Here Now	S/S Friends	Mixer	2012
Line and Circle	Roman Ruins	White Iris Records	Mixer	2012
The Chevin	Borderland	So Recordings/Silva Sheen Records	Producer, Engineer, Mixer	2012
Monte Pittman	Pain, Love, and Destiny	Monte Pittman	Producer, Engineer, Mixer	2011
Fools Gold	Leave No Trace	IAMSOUND Records	Mixer	2011
Nikki Lane	Gone, Gone, Gone	IAMSOUND Records	Mixer	2011
Me Talk Pretty	We Are Strangers	Eight O Five	Producer, Engineer, Mixer	2011
Ari Shine	Ghost Town Directory	Beverly Martel	Producer, Engineer, Mixer	2011
Atreyu	Covers of the Damned	My Dead Heart	Producer, Engineer, Mixer	2011
Run Run Run	Pico	P-Pineal Eye	Mixer	2010
The Secret Handshake	Night and Day	Triple Crown Records	Producer, Engineer, Mixer	2010
I Fight Dragons	Welcome To The Breakdown	Atlantic Records	Mixer	2010
Sonny (Skrillex)	Gypsyhook	Atlantic Records	Producer, Engineer, Mixer	2009
Atreyu	Congregation of the Damned	Hollywood Records	Producer, Engineer, Mixer	2009
Orson	Culture Vultures	Mercury Records	Producer, Engineer, Mixer	2009
Horse The Band	Desperate Living	Vagrant Records	Producer, Engineer, Mixer	2009
Endless Hallway	Autonomy Games	Wind-Up Records	Producer, Engineer, Mixer	2009
Jordan Zevon	Inside Out	New West Records	Producer, Engineer, Mixer	2008
Run Run Run	Endless Winter	Pineal Eye	Producer, Engineer, Mixer	2006
Keaton Simons	Blink	Beverly Martell Music	Producer, Engineer, Mixer	2006
Orson	Bright Idea	Orson	Producer, Engineer, Mixer	2006
L. Cedeno	Bliss Wishes	E.M.7	Addl. Production and Mixer	
