= Prince Henry's Grammar School, Otley =

Prince Henry's Grammar School
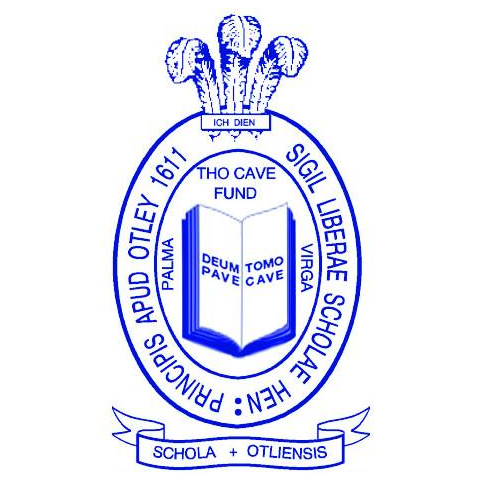

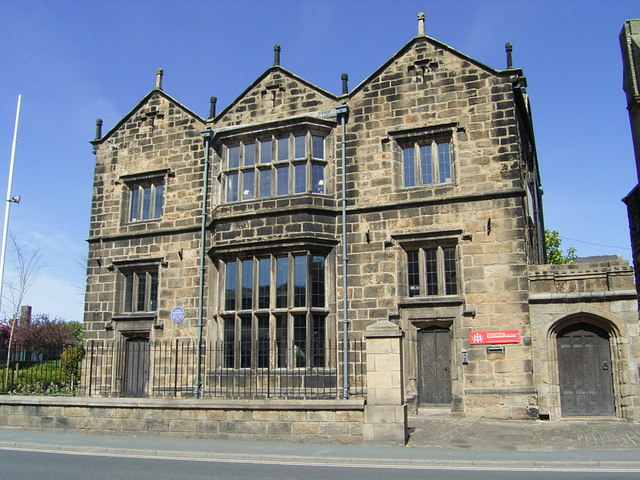
- Old school premises at Manor Square in Otley

Location
- Farnley Lane; Otley, West Yorkshire, LS21 2BB; England; 53.9124°N 1.6937°W

Information
- Type: Comprehensive; Academy
- Established: 1607; 419 years ago
- Local authority: City of Leeds
- Specialist: Language College
- Department for Education URN: 137704 Tables
- Ofsted: Reports
- Headteacher Governor: Sally Bishop
- Gender: Mixed
- Age: 11 to 18
- Enrolment: 1430
- Colours: Blue and White
- School Seal: Latin: SIG LIBERAE SCHOLAE HEN PRINCIPIS APUD OTLEY; Seal of the free school of Prince Henry in Otley
- Website: http://www.princehenrys.co.uk/

Prince Henry's Grammar School (a specialist language college), also known as Prince Henry's or PHGS, is a co-educational comprehensive secondary school and sixth form established in 1607 in the market town of Otley, West Yorkshire, England. The school teaches pupils between the ages of 11 and 18 and has around 1,400 students and 84 teachers. It retains a high position within regional league tables. In 2016, Prince Henry's had the third-highest results for General Certificate of Secondary Education (GCSE) examinations in Leeds. Also in 2016, PHGS was the best state school in Leeds for A Level results. The school has repeatedly received a “good” rating from Ofsted with outstanding features; however, in the past it has been criticised for the state of the old school building. Despite its name, Prince Henry's is now a state-funded comprehensive academy school.

== History ==
=== Origins ===
The money for the school originally came from the will of Thomas Cave, a local cloth merchant, in 1603. Thomas Cave left £250 for the establishment of a school in the parish of Otley on the condition that an equal amount of money be raised by the local community within four years. A royal charter was granted by King James I on 30 April 1607, just four days before the deadline laid out in the will expired. The royal charter was granted after a petition by local residents, including Thomas Fairfax and the local vicar, Reverend William Harrison, who became the first schoolmaster. A 1610 court case from York shows that the relatives of Thomas Cave and the executors of the will were reluctant to release the money from the will because of the delay in acquiring land for the school, which went against the terms attached to the money in the will. The court found in favour of the parishioners of Otley. The money, however, still did not arrive in the parish . The situation led to a second court case in 1611, which eventually caused the money to be obtained and used to buy land for the school. £380 was used to buy land from James and Mary Green near Thirsk. This land was then rented back to the couple and their descendants for a thousand years in exchange for 40 marks a year, which was used to pay wages for the school staff.

According to the Royal Charter, which established the school, the original name of the school was "The Free Grammar School of Prince Henry at Otley". Free in this context meant that the school was free from church jurisdiction and free to choose their own curriculum. The School was named after King James's son Henry Frederick Stuart, Prince of Wales, who was at the time the heir to the throne, but died in 1612.

Teaching began in 1611 in the Old Vicarage as a permanent site had not yet been procured. The original statutes of the school in 1611 state that the school master must be fluent in both Latin and Greek and that they would be paid £20 a year for their work, there was no increase in this amount until 1861. The school day at the time lasted from 7 am to 5 pm, with two hours for lunch between 11 am and 1 pm, depending on seasonal conditions. According to the original charter the school was founded to teach both rich and poor in the local parish.

Land was granted by the Archbishop of York, who had an estate in Otley, for the creation of a permanent school. The original school building was built in Manor Square and finished in 1614. This site was sold in 1883 and since then has been an art gallery and is currently a restaurant.

=== First school ===
The original school building was only one floor. A second floor was added in 1790 after a £40 grant from the Archbishop of York. There was a further grant of £16 in 1808 from the archbishop for repairs. Due to declining class sizes in later years the building was also the site of an infant school and a Sunday school. The school building was also used as a court room after 1850 until the building of the Otley Courthouse in 1874.

Between 1789 and 1806 the school master was William Bawdwen, who translated the Domesday Book.

An inspection of the school in 1824 found that there were around 5 pupils receiving a free education in Latin and Greek. However, a further 40 pupils received lessons in maths and English writing and grammar which their parents paid for. These subjects and the style of teaching is likely to be the same from the very beginning of the school.

=== New scheme and closure ===
In April 1861 a new scheme to govern the school was approved by the Court of Chancery. This scheme removed the original charter and governor system and created a charity for the school which was run by eleven trustees. The curriculum at this time composed of 'the principles of the Christian religion', Latin, French, reading, writing, arithmetic, natural philosophy, history, geography, book-keeping, land-surveying, drawing, and design and music. The school at this time was open to every boy between 7 and 18 from the parish of Otley. The cost for boys under 10 was 1s 3d a week, rising to 2s for those over 10. The school master was to be paid £20 a year as well as 75% of the school fees, with the rest going to the upkeep of the school. The introduction of fees to all pupils led to a slow decline in new students starting in the school.

An inspection of the school in 1867 found that there were 30 students, 20 of which were under the age of 12. At this time the school was open for 48 weeks a year and 30½ hours a week.

The school closed in 1874 due to financial issues and increased competition with other schools which were being established across the country after the Elementary Education Act 1870. The school did not reopen until 1918. In 1883 the schoolhouse was sold for £800 by the trustees.

=== Reopening and later history ===
In 1888, a new scheme under the Endowed Schools Act 1869 allowed the funds raised by the sale of the school to be used to give four grants of £15 each, which would last for three years, and be given to local boys to attend other grammar schools in Leeds, Bradford or Ripon. By 1904, due to investment of the former school's finances the school was making £120 a year profit, despite the fact it did not exist. The West Riding County Council in 1904 decided to build a new secondary school for the Wharfedale district in Guiseley, instead of Otley, despite hopes that Prince Henry's Grammar School could be recreated.

The Board of Education planned to reopen the school in 1909, but these plans were slowed down by the County Council and the outbreak of the First World War. The new plan laid out that the school should have 15 governors managing the school, and that the school should be in or near Otley. The plan for the first time also allowed girls to attend. The School was at this time also renamed to its present name of "Prince Henry's Grammar School". In 1909 the school still owned the property near Thirsk that it had acquired in 1611, but it was now being rented by the Earls of Harewood for the price of £26 13s 4d a year. The school trust also had £3000 in savings. The school governors bought the current Farnley Lane site of the school for £1,575, but in 1911 the County Council refused to help any further to develop the site into a school. In 1917 the MP James Hastings Duncan made an appeal to the Minister for Education which finally led to the reopening of the school.

The school reopened after 44 years on 18 September 1918, temporarily based out of the Mechanics Institute, which later became Otley Town Hall. When it reopened there were 117 students. For the first time the school was also eligible for local and national education grants. Teaching began in the new school building on Farnley Lane in 1927.

Under the Education Act 1944 Prince Henry's became the local grammar school under the Tripartite System. The victory of the Labour party in the 1964 and 1966 general elections, and the release of Circular 10/65 marked an end to the Grammar School system. In 1967 Otley Secondary Modern School joined with Prince Henry's, which then became a comprehensive school. Otley Secondary Modern School was founded in 1935 and was located in North Lane. Following the merger new buildings were constructed at the Farnley Lane site, to accommodate the extra pupils, which were opened by Prince Charles in 1970.

In 2007, the school completed the integration of a rugby academy into its sixth form. In 2010 the school pioneered a race equality programme which has been rolled out across the country. The school caused controversy in 2013 by asking parents to contribute £360 for each child so that the school might give them iPads. Parents raised concerns about the cost of the scheme, whether the iPad was the best model to use and the potential threat to the concept of free education. The scheme went ahead later in 2014.

=== School governors ===
The original school governors were:

- Thomas Fairfax
- Guy Palmes
- Sir Robert Dyneley of Bramhope
- Thomas Fawkes Esq. of Farnley Hall
- Christopher Cave, Yeoman of Otley
- Christopher Cave, Yeoman of Menston
- Jeffrey Pickard, Yeoman of Menston

Other noteworthy governors have included 2nd Lord Fairfax, Charles Fairfax, 3rd Lord Fairfax, Henry Arthington, 4th Lord Fairfax, 5th Lord Fairfax, William Palmes, and William Gabriel Davy, as well as several members of the Vavasour family, Hawkesworth family and the Fawkes family. Under the new scheme of 1861 the governors were replaced with trustees. These trustees were for the most part local factory owners such as Peter Garnett, Jeremiah Garnett, Thomas Hartley, William Ackroyd and William Fison, father of Frederick Fison.

== Specialist statuses ==
In 1999 the school became a Specialist Language College. Since then the school has taught Spanish, French, German, Chinese and Italian to its pupils. The funding from this status has allowed the school to create new teaching resources as well as provide language lessons to local primary schools and evening courses to the community.

== Building and facilities ==
The school's current location is to the north of the River Wharfe; the front of the building is an old Edwardian school house complete with clock tower. The building has received frequent additions, the most recent of which was a new science block added in May 2008.

In 2014 £900,000 was used to build four new classrooms, create a new sixth form area as well as improvements to the original 1927 building.

The School's sports facilities include a swimming pool, gym, several tennis courts and rugby pitches as well as two fully equipped sports halls.

== Extracurricular activities and school trips ==
The school's media and music departments produce an annual musical; recent years have seen Les Misérables, Back to the Eighties, Grease, South Pacific and Return to the Forbidden Planet performed. The music department ensembles run throughout the year and include: PHOJO (Jazz Orchestra); Concert Band; Orchestra; Senior Choir; Strings; Junior Band and 'Sing Up!' (A year 7/8 vocal group). These groups often perform at local churches in Otley and Ilkley as well as at art exhibition openings and abroad (France, Italy and Belgium most recently).

Sporting achievements include rugby, which is a popular sport at PHGS as is netball. In the 2003–04 season the school rugby union team won the Daily Mail Under-18 Vase. In 2017 one team from the school was undefeated for the entire season. The PE department organises a biennial rugby tour to Dubai.

PHGS runs foreign exchanges, as the school has international links in Europe, Durban, South Africa and China. The history department runs biennial trips to Russia, Italy and to the battlefields of the First World War. The language department do frequent trips and exchanges to France, Spain, Germany and China. The school is a long-term participant in the EU's Comenius exchange programme, and has worked with schools in Spain, Denmark and the Czech Republic.

Students from the school take part in the Citizenship Foundation's national bar mock trials and a number of sixth formers are members of the debating society, which has won several national awards.

== Iraq War walkout controversy ==
On 5 March 2003 prior to the Iraq War, the school suspended two sixth formers for trying to organise a demonstration against the war at the school and giving anti-war speeches in the school cafeteria.

== Academy controversy ==
During 2011 school governors examined the possibility of the school becoming an Academy. There was "almost unanimous opposition" from two public meetings to the school becoming an Academy. Despite this the governors voted 10 to 9 in favour of conversion. NUT and NASUWT teachers, through fear of changes in pay and conditions, decided to strike on six days during November, with unions giving notice that 64 teachers would take part. The Unions demanded that the conversion must be halted for further consultation.

The strike reached national news coverage, as well as a large amount of coverage in local news channels, newspapers and radio. Across the six days of strike action by the unions a number of teachers, students and parents protested at the school gates. On 26 November there was a protest march throughout Otley which was made up of nearly 400 members of the community. Protests continued up until the day of the conversion, and finally on 1 December the school converted to an academy. The conversion was also opposed by the local vicar, the local MP, Greg Mulholland and Otley Town Council.

== Alumni ==
- Lizzie Armitstead – silver medal 2012 Summer Olympics, professional track and road racing cyclist
- Qais Ashfaq – English professional boxer
- Jill Atkins – three-time Olympian and former hockey player
- Clio Barnard – filmmaker and documentarian
- Liz Blackman – former MP for Erewash
- Olivia Blake – current MP for Sheffield Hallam
- Lewis Boyce – rugby union player for Bath and England
- David Thomas Broughton – musician
- Brian Harvey Ellison – late The Glitter Band saxophonist
- Coyle Girelli – vocalist and guitarist for The Chevin
- Jon Langford – bass guitarist for The Chevin
- Mat Steel – guitarist and keyboardist for The Chevin
- Mal Taylor – drummer for The Chevin
- Danny Care – Harlequins and England scrum-half
- Thomas Chippendale – cabinet-maker
- Georgia Coates – British swimmer
- Joanna Coles – content executive at Hearst Magazines, Marie Claire (American version), and Cosmopolitan.
- Jeremiah Garnett – one of the co-founders of The Guardian
- Richard Garnett – philologist and author
- Thomas Garnett – paper manufacturer and naturalist
- Harry Hepworth – British artistic gymnast, bronze medallist at 2024 Summer Olympics
- Paul Hill – Northampton and England prop
- Rachel Leech – scientist who studied the biology of plant chloroplasts
- Anne Longfield – former Children's Commissioner for England
- Tim Marshall – journalist, broadcaster, and former Sky News foreign affairs editor
- Ben Sowrey – rugby union player for Leeds
- Mark Stanley – actor
- Tye Raymont – Rugby Union player and England International
- Jack Walker – Rugby Union player and England International
- Lucy Chambers - actress
