= Corringham =

Corringham may refer to:

- Corringham, Essex, England
- Corringham, Lincolnshire, England
