= Thomas Cave =

Thomas Cave may refer to:

- Sir Thomas Cave (died 1609) (1540–1609), MP for Leicester
- Cave-Browne-Cave baronets called Thomas Cave, including:
  - Sir Thomas Cave, 3rd Baronet (1681–1719), British MP for Leicestershire 1711–1719
  - Sir Thomas Cave, 5th Baronet (1712–1778), his son, British MP for Leicestershire 1741–1747 and 1762–1774
  - Sir Thomas Cave, 7th Baronet (1766–1792), his grandson, British MP for Leicestershire 1790–1792
- Thomas Cave (Liberal politician) (1825–1894), Member of Parliament for Barnstaple 1865–1880
- Thomas Cave (merchant) (died 1603), English chapman and cloth merchant
- Thomas H. Cave (1870–1958), Vermont political figure who served as State Treasurer
- Tom Cave (born 1991), British rally driver

== See also ==
- Cave (disambiguation)
