= John Winter Jones =

English librarian

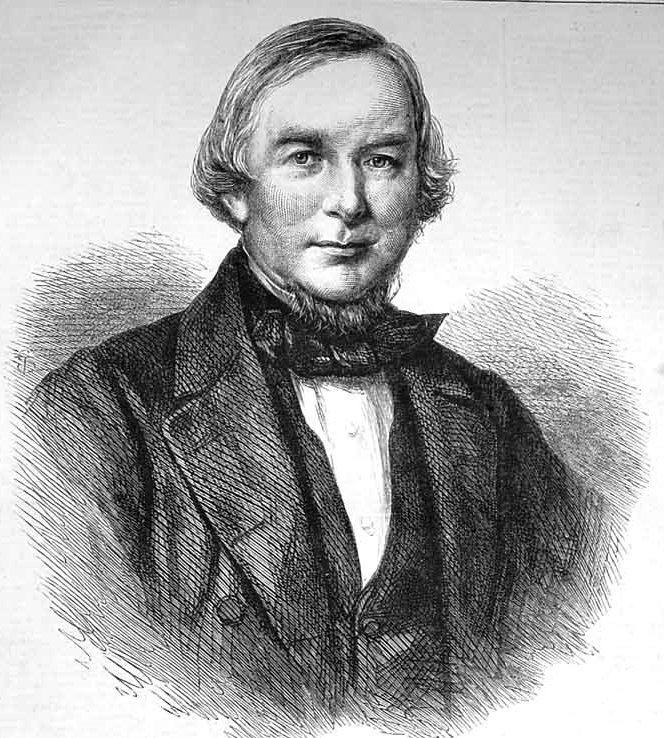
- Engraving of John Winter Jones
- Born: 1805; London, England
- Died: 1881 (aged 75–76)
- Occupation: Librarian
- Employer: British Museum

Signature
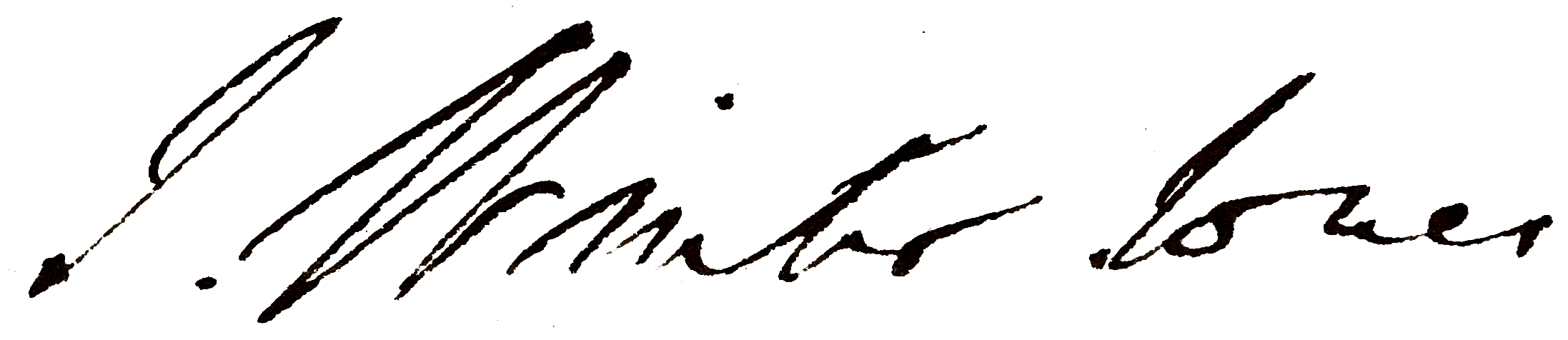

John Winter Jones (16 June 1805 – 7 September 1881) was an English librarian. He was Principal Librarian of the British Museum between 1866 and 1873. He was the first President of the Library Association in the U.K.

== Biography ==
Jones was born in Lambeth, London and he was prevented from joining the legal profession due to a problem with his speech. He had been educated at St Paul's School in London and then starting to train in the law at Lincoln's Inn before becoming the travelling secretary to the Charity Commissioners (c.1835–37). His father was literary and had been editor of the Naval Chronicle and the European Magazine. He joined the British Museum in April 1837. He was central in determining their rules for cataloguing. Following the death of Richard Garrett he was appointed Assistant Keeper of Printed Books in 1850, Keeper (1856–66) (following the promotion of Anthony Panizzi), and then Principal Librarian in charge of the museum (1866–78).

Jones enjoyed a large budget of £10,000 to spend on books alone. This figure had been negotiated by his predecessor, Sir Anthony Panizzi, who had been knighted for his efforts as the Chief Librarian. Jones approved every purchase that was made.

Jones was appointed President of the Library Association in 1877. He edited works for the Hakluyt Society. He contributed over 200 articles for the Biographical Dictionary of the Society for the Diffusion of Useful Knowledge.

John Winter Jones was the nephew of the editor Stephen Jones (1763–1827).

== Bibliography ==
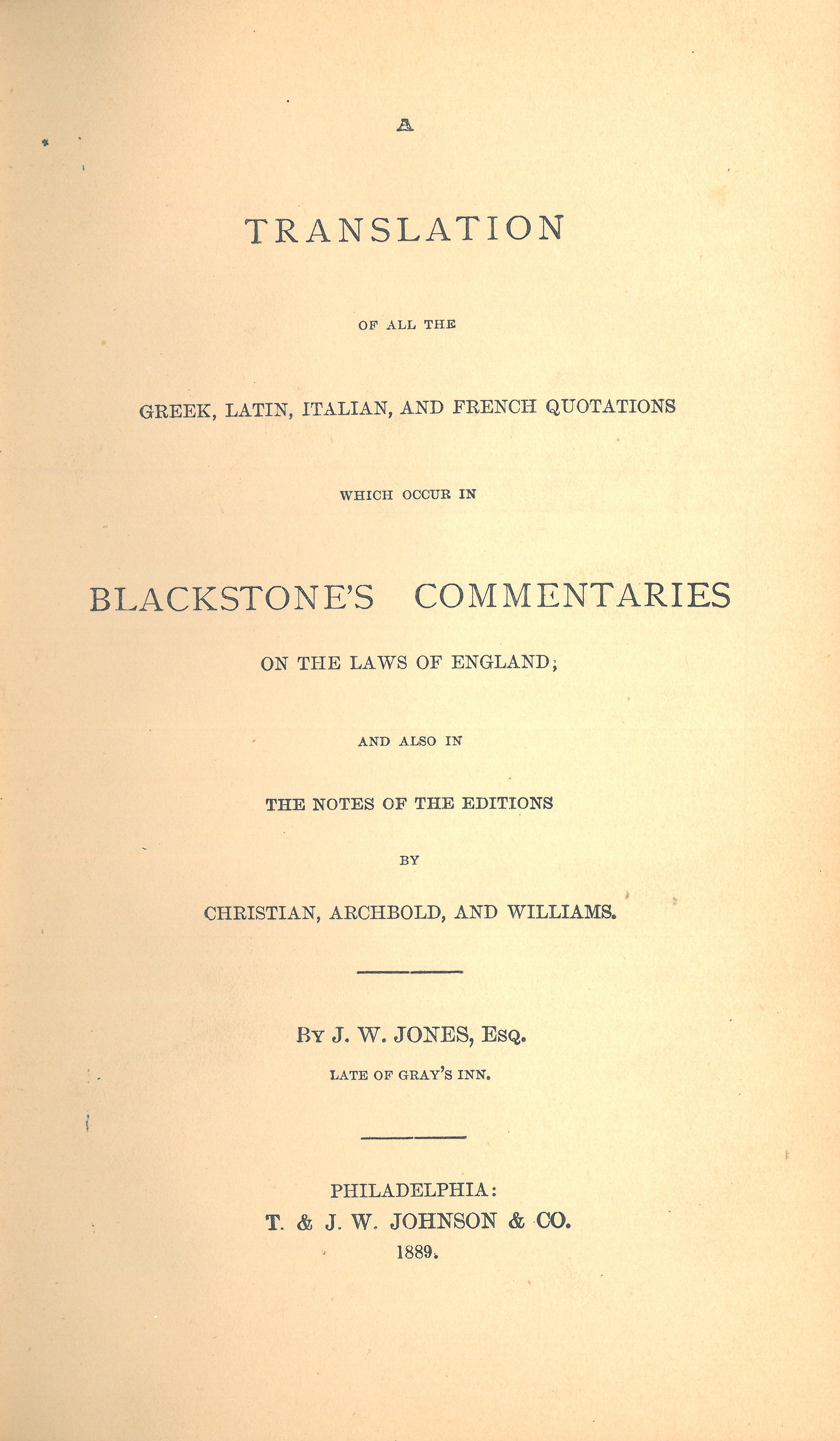
The title page of Jones's A Translation of All the Greek, Latin, Italian and French Quotations which Occur in Blackstone's Commentaries on the Laws of England (1889 edition)

- J[ohn] W[inter] Jones (1823), A Translation of All the Greek, Latin, Italian and French Quotations which Occur in Blackstone's Commentaries on the Laws of England; and also in the Notes of the Editions by Christian, Archbold, and Williams, London: Printed for Charles Reader, Law Bookseller, 29, Bell's Yard, Lincoln's Inn; M. A. Nattali, 24, Tavistock Street, Covent Garden; J. Carfrae, Edinburgh; and R. Milliken, Dublin, OCLC 8044881.
- Richard Hakluyt and J. Winter Jones, Divers voyages touching the discovery of America and the islands. London: Hakluyt Society, 1850.
- J. Winter Jones, Observations on the origin of the division of man's life into stages. London: F. S. Ellis, 1861. Reprinted from Archaeologia, Volume XXII.
- J. Winter Jones, A Guide to the Print Book Collection to the Public, London: Woodfall and Kinder, 1862. Printed for the British Museum.
- J. Winter Jones, Preface. In: British Museum, Department of Printed Books, List of books forming the reference library in the reading room of the British Museum, 4th edition. British Museum, 1910. Printed for the Trustees of the British Museum.
