= Richard Garnett (philologist) =

- Born: 25 July 1789; Otley, Yorkshire
- Died: 27 September 1850 (aged 61); London
- Occupation: Librarian
- Known for: lexicography, philology

Richard Garnett (25 July 1789 – 27 September 1850) was an English philologist (historical linguist), author and librarian at the British Museum, in the museum's department that is now the British Library. Of his six children, his son Richard Garnett (1835–1906) also went into the British Library, making a name for himself as a scholar, biographer and poet. Through him are descended several writers and connections with the Bloomsbury Group, while his daughter was the diarist Olive Garnett.

== Life ==
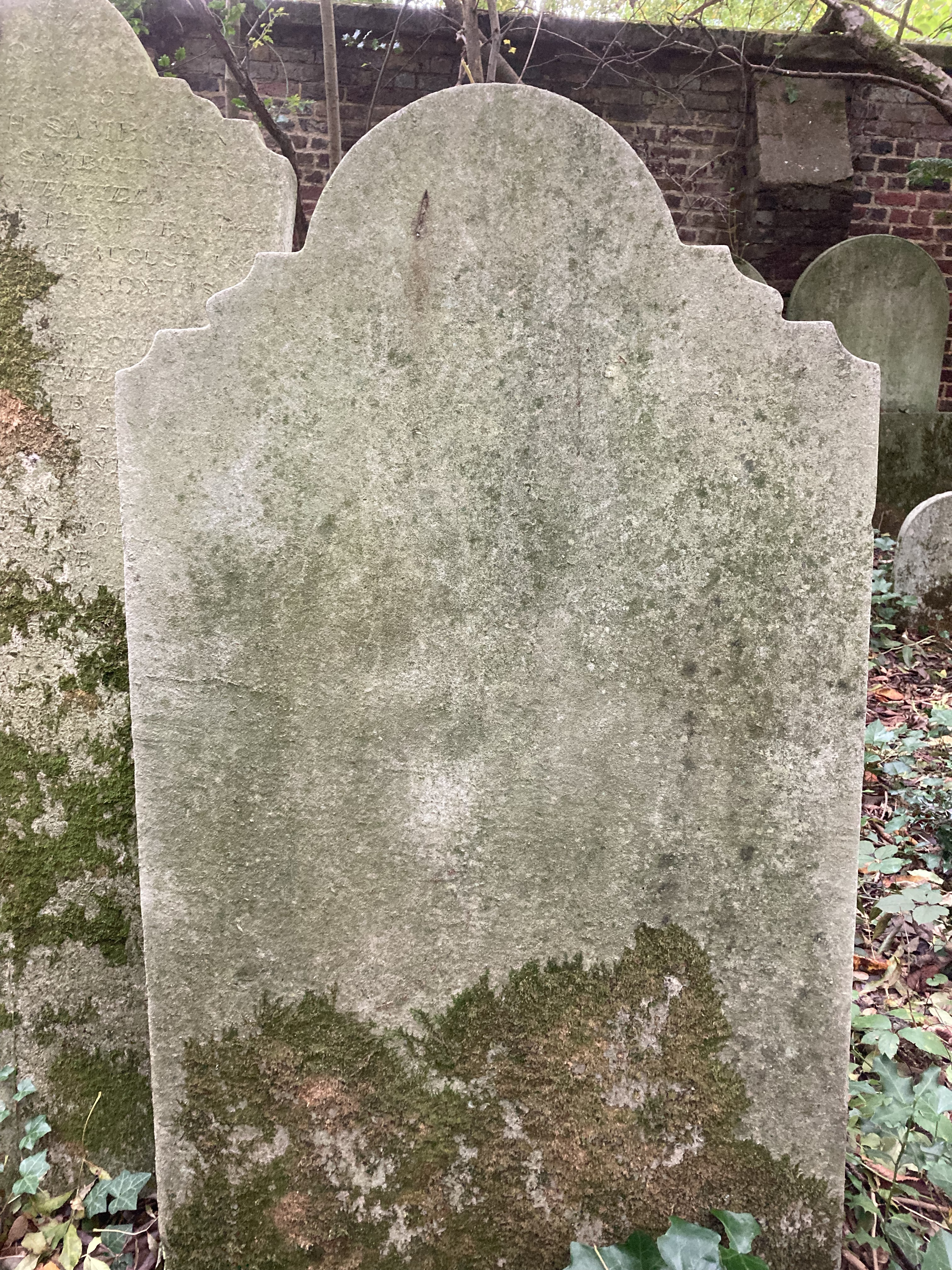
Grave of Richard Garnett in Highgate Cemetery

Garnett was born at Otley in Yorkshire on 25 July 1789, the eldest son of a paper manufacturer, William Garnett. He was educated at Otley grammar school, and afterwards learned French and Italian from an Italian gentleman named Facio, it being intended to place him in a mercantile house. This design was abandoned, and he remained at home, assisting his father in his manufactory, and teaching himself German, that he might be able to read a book on birds in that language. In 1811, convinced that trade was not his vocation, he became assistant-master in the school of the Rev. Evelyn Falkner at Southwell, Nottinghamshire, devoting his leisure hours to preparing himself for the church. Within two years he had taught himself sufficient Latin, Greek, and divinity to obtain ordination from the Archbishop of York, whose chaplain pronounced him the best prepared candidate he had ever examined. After a brief settlement in Yorkshire he became curate at Blackburn and assistant-master of the grammar school, and continued there for several years, engaged in incessant study and research.

In 1822 he married his first wife, Margaret, granddaughter of the Rev. Ralph Heathcote, and in 1826 was presented to the perpetual curacy of Tockholes, near Blackburn. Some time before, he had made the acquaintance of Robert Southey, who in a letter to John Rickman calls him "a very remarkable person. He did not begin to learn Greek till he was twenty, and he is now, I believe, acquainted with all the European languages of Latin or Teutonic origin, and with sundry oriental ones. I do not know any man who has read so much which you would not expect him to have read".

In 1834 he married Rayne, daughter of John Wreaks, esq., of Sheffield, and in 1836 was presented to the living of Chebsey, near Stafford, which he relinquished in 1838, on succeeding Henry Francis Cary, the translator of Dante, as assistant-keeper of printed books at the British Museum.

He died of a degenerative disease, 27 September 1850 and he was succeeded at the Museum by John Winter Jones. He is buried on the western side of Highgate Cemetery.

== Works ==
About 1826 he came before the world as a writer on the 'Roman Catholic controversy', contributing numerous articles to the Protestant Guardian, the most remarkable of which were extremely humorous and sarcastic exposures of the apocryphal miracles attributed to St. Francis Xavier. He also commenced and in great measure completed an extensive work in reply to Charles Butler on the subject of ecclesiastical miracles; but the extreme depression of spirits occasioned by the death of his wife and infant daughter in 1828 and 1829 compelled him to lay it aside. He sought relief in change of residence, becoming priest-vicar of Lichfield Cathedral in 1820, and absorbed himself in the study of comparative philology, then just beginning to be recognised as a science. Having obtained an introduction to Lockhart, he contributed in 1835 and 1836 three articles to the Quarterly Review, treating respectively of English lexicography, English dialects, and Prichard's work on the Celtic languages. These papers attracted great attention, and were almost the first introduction of German philological research to the English public. He made the Celtic question peculiarly his own. His conviction of the extent of the Celtic element in European languages, and of the importance of Celtic studies in general was to have been expressed in an article in the Quarterly Review on Skene's Highlanders, which for some reason never appeared.

Though exemplary in his attention to his duties at the British Museum, he took little part in the great changes then being effected in the library under Anthony Panizzi, but was an active member of the Philological Society founded in 1842. To its 'Transactions' he contributed numerous papers, including two long and important series of essays "On the Languages and Dialects of the British Islands," and "On the Nature and Analysis of the Verb".

Garnett is identified as contributing to a practical type of English semantics, associated with lexicography and etymology, distinguished from the philosophical stream following John Locke.

His brief epitaph was written by a colleague in the Museum—"Few men have left so fragrant a memory". Besides his philological essays, edited by his eldest son in 1859, and his theological writings, which have not hitherto been collected, he was author of some graceful poems and translations, and of a remarkable paper 'On the Formation of Ice at the Bottoms of Rivers' in the Transactions of the Royal Institution for 1818, containing a most graphic account of the phenomenon from personal observation. It is republished along with the essays of his brother Thomas Garnett.

As a philologist he is thus characterised in the preface to Mr. Kington Oliphant's Sources of Standard English:

"It is a loss to mankind that Garnett has left so little behind him. He seems to have been the nearest approach England ever made to bringing forth a Mezzofanti, and he combined in himself qualities not often found in the same man. When his toilsome industry is amassing facts he plods like a German; when his playful wit is unmasking quackery he flashes like a Frenchman."
