= Jeremiah Garnett =

English journalist (1793–1870)

Jeremiah Garnett (2 October 1793 – 27 September 1870) was an English journalist, active in the politics of London and the founding of The Manchester Guardian alongside his nephew Anthony Garnett.

== Life ==
Jeremiah, younger brother of Richard Garnett (1789–1850) and elder brother of Thomas Garnett the manufacturer, was born at Otley in Yorkshire, 2 October 1793. After being apprenticed to a printer at Barnsley, he entered the office of Wheeler's Manchester Chronicle about 1814, and with a brief interruption continued there until 1821, when he joined John Edward Taylor in establishing the Manchester Guardian. Garnett was printer, business manager, and sole reporter during the first years of the journal. He took his notes using an improvised form of shorthand, then prepared type for printing without a written copy.

As the paper gained ground Garnett's share in the editorial side increased, and in January 1844 he became sole editor on the death of his partner Taylor, a position which he held until his retirement in 1861. During these 40 years he was a force in the public life of Manchester and Lancashire generally. The Guardian was widely read by Tories and Anti-Corn Law Leaguers, who had little sympathy with its moderate liberal politics. He was active as a police commissioner, and in obtaining a charter of incorporation for the city. His correspondence and advice were politically influential, but his public appearances were infrequent. The most important was on the occasion of the expulsion of Thomas Milner Gibson and John Bright from the representation of Manchester in 1857, which was almost entirely due to his initiative.

His nephew was Richard Garnett (1835–1906), the author of his entry in the Dictionary of National Biography (1900), who says,

"As a man he was upright and benevolent, but singularly averse to display; as a writer for the press his principal characteristics were strong common-sense and extreme clearness of style."

After his retirement he lived in Scotland and at Sale, Cheshire, where he died on 27 September 1870.
