= List of directors of the British Museum =

The Director of the British Museum is the head of the British Museum in London, a post currently held by Nicholas Cullinan. They are responsible for the institution's general administration and reports its accounts to the British Government. The actual governance of the British Museum, however, is delegated to its board of trustees.

At the museum's inception its most senior member of staff was called "principal librarian". The job title became "director and principal librarian" in 1898, and "director" in 1973, on the separation of the British Library from the museum.

== List of directors ==
=== Principal librarians (1756–1898) ===
- 1756–1772: Gowin Knight
- 1772–1776: Matthew Maty
- 1776–1799: Charles Morton
- 1799–1827: Joseph Planta
- 1827–1856: Sir Henry Ellis
- 1856–1866: Sir Anthony Panizzi
- 1866–1873: John Winter Jones
- 1873–1888: Sir Edward Augustus Bond
- 1888–1898: Sir Edward Maunde Thompson

=== Directors and principal librarians (1898–1974) ===
- 1898–1909: Sir Edward Maunde Thompson
- 1909–1931: Sir Frederic George Kenyon
- 1931–1936: Sir George Francis Hill
- 1936–1950: Sir John Forsdyke
- 1950–1959: Sir Thomas Downing Kendrick
- 1959–1969: Sir Frank Francis
- 1969–1974: John Wolfenden

=== Directors (1973) ===
- 1974–1977: Sir John Pope-Hennessy
- 1977–1992: Sir David M. Wilson
- 1992–2002: Robert Anderson
- 1999–2001 Suzanna Taverne (managing director)
- 2003–2015: Neil MacGregor
- 2016–2023: Hartwig Fischer
- 2023–2024: Sir Mark Jones (interim)
- 2024–present: Nicholas Cullinan

== List of deputy directors ==
- 1971–1983: Maysie Webb; first incumbent
- 1983–1997: Jean Rankine
- 1997–2002:
- 2002–2013: Andrew Burnett
- 2002–2005: Dawn Austwick
- 2013–2026 Joanna Mackle (her death)
- 2013–present: Jonathan Williams

== See also ==
- List of trustees of the British Museum
