= William Bawdwen =

William Bawdwen (1762–1816) was a Church of England clergyman, school teacher and English antiquary.

== Life ==
Bawdwen was the son of William Bawdwen, of Stone Gap, Craven, Yorkshire, born 9 March 1762. He was educated at Manchester Grammar School, and subsequently took holy orders. He is described on the title-pages of his books as B.A., but his name does not occur in the lists of Oxford or Cambridge graduates. He is said to have been at one time curate of Wakefield; he later became curate of Frickly-cum-Clayton and vicar of Hooton Pagnell, benefices near Doncaster, which he held until his death. He was also the school master of Prince Henry's Grammar School, Otley between 1789 and 1806.

Bawdwen married Ann, daughter of William Shackleton, of Wakefield on 30 December 1793, and died at Hooton Pagnell on 14 September 1816, leaving twelve children. The estate of Stone Gap, which had been in his family for two hundred years, was sold by Bawdwen soon after he succeeded to it.

== Works ==
Bawdwen began a translation of the Domesday Book from the edition published by the Record Commission in 1783; he intended to complete it in ten volumes, but two only appeared before his death. The first volume was published in 1809 at Doncaster with a dedication to Lord Fitzwilliam, under the title of Dom Boc; a translation of the Record called Domesday, so far as relates to the county of York, including Amounderness, Lonsdale, and Furness in Lancashire, and such parts of Westmoreland, Cumberland, as are contained in the Survey; also the counties of Derby, Nottingham, Rutland, and Lincoln, with an introduction, glossary, and indexes. The second volume appeared in 1812, and dealt with the Hertfordshire, Middlesex, Buckinghamshire, Oxfordshire, and Gloucestershire. Bawdwen also contributed a translation of the Domesday survey of Dorset to the fourth volume of John Hutchins's History of Dorsetshire.
