= Olive Garnett =

British diarist (1871-1958)

- Garnett in 1893
- Born: Olivia Rayne Garnett; 21 August 1871; Marylebone, England
- Died: 17 March 1958 (aged 86); Minehead, England
- Other name: Olive Garnett
- Education: Queen's College, London
- Parent: Richard Garnett
- Relatives: Richard Garnett (grandfather); Edward Garnett (brother); Constance Garnett (sister in law)

Olive Garnett ( 21 August 1871 – 17 March 1958) was an English diarist and author of two collections of short stories inspired by her time in Russia. Her diaries, rediscovered in the 1970s, included new details about Ford Madox Ford’s early life, work, marriage and nervous breakdown.

== Early life and education ==
Olivia Rayne Garnett was born on 21 August 1871 in London, the fifth of six children of Richard Garnett (1835-1906), Keeper of Printed Books at the British Museum, and Olivia Narney née Singleton (1842–1906). She grew up on St Edmund's Terrace, Primrose Hill, an area popular with artists and literary figures including the painter, Ford Madox Brown. Olive became friends with Brown's grandchildren, including Ford Madox Ford with whom she developed an intense friendship. Garnett attended Queen's College on Harley Street until 1889. In 1890 the Garnetts moved into accommodation at the British Museum. She was briefly engaged to architect and designer Alfred Hoare Powell in 1897.

== Sergius Stepniak ==
In 1891 Garnett took Russian lessons from the journalist, revolutionary and political exile Feliks Volkhovsky. In December she attended a meeting of the Society of Friends of Russian Freedom, where she saw the Ukrainian revolutionary and writer Sergey Stepnyak-Kravchinsky, known as Sergius Stepniak. They met formerly the following year and Garnett quickly became attracted to him, writing, "I like Stepniak more and more, and in proportion as I like him I find him positively handsome." By the following year, he was giving her advice on her own writing.

Garnett also knew the Russian anarchist Peter Kropotkin and his wife Sofia Ananyeva-Rabinovich, and although she "hated revolutionary activities" she helped to create a list "of respectable and reliably permanent London addresses to which letters can be sent to Russian refugees from abroad". She also compiled a bibliography of English and French books on Russia, and in the mid-1890s translated a Russian friend's memoirs into English.

When Stepniak was killed at a railway crossing in 1895, Garnett "in bitter grief cut off all her hair." In 1896 she spent a year as a governess in Russia in the "highly cultivated Arseniev household" where she mixed with the "best Petersburg families", attended literary salons, and taught English.

=== After Stepniak's death ===
In 1897 Garnett was briefly engaged to architect Alfred Hoare Powell (1865–1960). When Garnett's father retired from the British Museum in 1899, she and her parents moved to Tanza Road, Hampstead. Following her father's death in 1906 she moved in with her youngest brother in Kew. In 1910 she held a meeting at her Richmond home for women's suffrage. In 1913 she donated to the Women's Suffrage Great Pilgrimage. In later years, according to her nephew and niece, she became a "rigid, reticent old maid". Garnett died on 17 March 1958 in Minehead.

== Friendship with Ford Madox Ford ==
Garnett developed an early and intense friendship with the author Ford Madox Ford. In 1899 Garnett had a reading ticket at the British Museum Library in order to carry out research for Ford.

In 1904 Garnett saw Ford "on the brink of madness, shipped off to Germany". Her friendship with Ford began to cool in 1906, about which she wrote "We had a Free trade discourse; & a moment of hate? Distrust? Something peeped out." In 1910 Garnett attended Ford's court case, which resulted in him spending ten days in prison for unpaid child maintenance. In 1911 Garnett's friendship with Ford ended, possibly because she thought his novel The Simple Life Limited, was "scandalous, because she saw the hysterical Cyril Randetski as Ford's portrait of her adored Stepniak, and the 'tactless, strident, puritanical, outraged' Miss Stobhall as herself." However, Garnett remained a lifelong friend of Ford's first wife, Elsie M. Hueffer.

== Diary ==
In June 1890, when the Garnett family moved into the British Museum, she began to keep a diary. Her diaries were discovered in the late 1970s. They were kept by her niece, Mrs. Frank (Anne) Lee Michell, the daughter of Robert Garnett. Michell initially transcribed a selection of entries from 1890 to 1906 under the title A Bloomsbury Girlhood (the entries after 1906 being "obscure and brief").

Barry C. Johnson subsequently published three collections of her diary:

- Tea and Anarchy! The Bloomsbury Diary of Olive Garnett 1890–1893 (1989) ISBN 978-0951711514
- The Diary and Letters of Olive Garnett (1989)
- Olive & Stepniak: The Bloomsbury diary of Olive Garnett 1893–1895 (1993) ISBN 978-0951711538

== Other writing ==
During the 1890s Garnett contributed to the anarchist newspaper The Torch, run by William Michael Rossetti's older children, including Olivia Rossetti Agresti. She also wrote "drafts of several novels".

She published:

- Petersburg Tales (1900) featuring four short stories: "The Case of Vetrova", "Roukoff", "The Secret of the Universe" and "Out of It". Of the book, Madox wrote, "I am compounded of envies & thing & am pretty tired of having to say to people: 'You are five cuts above me.' But that is what I think of 'Roukoff'."
- A Russian Girl (1905)
- In Russia's Night (1918)

== Literary circles ==
Garnett was well-acquainted with D. H. Lawrence, Joseph Conrad, William Henry Hudson, John Galsworthy and Henry James. She was allegedly fictionalised as Natalia Haldin in Conrad's 1911 Under Western Eyes.

== See also ==
- Reading, Frances Katherine Mansfield and Russia (2018) Pub. Edinburgh University Press ISBN 9781474426152
- Reading, Frances Olive Garnett and Anglo-Russian Cultural Relations from Crimean War to the Russian Revolutions, 1855–1917 (2021) Pub. University of Kent
