= Thomas Garnett (manufacturer) =

Thomas Garnett (18 January 1799 – 21 May 1878c) was a manufacturer and naturalist.

== Life ==
Thomas, younger brother of Richard Garnett and Jeremiah Garnett was born at Otley, Yorkshire, England, in 1799. In his early days he supported himself by weaving pieces on his own account, but about the age or twenty-one he obtained employment in the great manufacturing establishment of Garnett & Horsfall, Low Moor, Clitheroe, founded and then directed by his uncle, Jeremiah Garnett, esq., of Roe Field. He successively became manager and partner, and at the time of his death had for many years been head of the firm.

He was one of the first to propose the artificial propagation of fish (aquaculture), on which he wrote in the Magazine of Natural History in 1832; he also first discovered the economical value of alpaca wool, which he failed in inducing his partners to take up; and he was one of the earliest experimenters with guano.

His papers on natural history and kindred subjects, observations compared to those of Gilbert White, were collected and privately printed by his nephew, Richard Garnett, in 1883. The same author said in his entry in the Dictionary Of National Biography, "[Thomas Garnett's] character was strong and decided; he was an active, useful citizen," and mentions that he was mayor of Clitheroe several times. He also said his uncle, "… possessed an inquiring and speculative intellect, and was an unwearied observer and experimenter in agriculture, medicine, and natural history."

He died in 1878.
