= Corringham, Lincolnshire =

Civil parish in Lincolnshire, England

Coordinates: 53.413225°N 0.682662°W

Corringham
- Civil parish
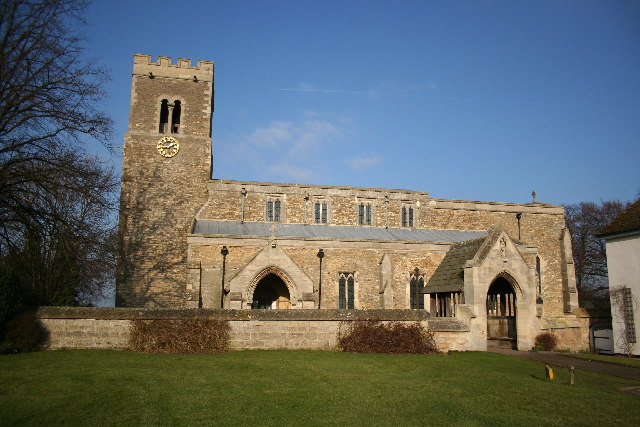
- Church of St Laurence, Corringham

- Location within Lincolnshire
- Population: 523 2011 census
- OS grid reference: SK875915
  - London: 135 mi (217 km) S
- District: West Lindsey
- Shire county: Lincolnshire
- Region: East Midlands
- Country: England
- Sovereign state: United Kingdom
- Post town: GAINSBOROUGH
- Postcode district: DN21
- Dialling code: 01427
- Police: Lincolnshire
- Fire: Lincolnshire
- Ambulance: East Midlands

Corringham is a civil parish in the West Lindsey district of Lincolnshire, England.

== Geography ==
It is situated 5 km (3 mi) east of Gainsborough and 16 km (10 mi) south of Scunthorpe. Corringham comprises the two contiguous villages of Great Corringham and Little Corringham and at the 2011 census had a recorded population of 523.

The hamlet of Yawthorpe lies due east of the village, and that of Bonsdale to the north.

Corringham is the source of the River Till.

== Oil field ==
An oil field was discovered 1938, with another in late May 1958 at Yawthorpe at 4,400 ft, by BP. The discovery caused a blow-out that covered the field in oil.

BP had drilled from 1975. In July 1980, BP were drilling.

== Notable residents ==
Gowin Knight, the first principal librarian of the British Museum was born here in 1713.
