= Gowin Knight =

British physicist

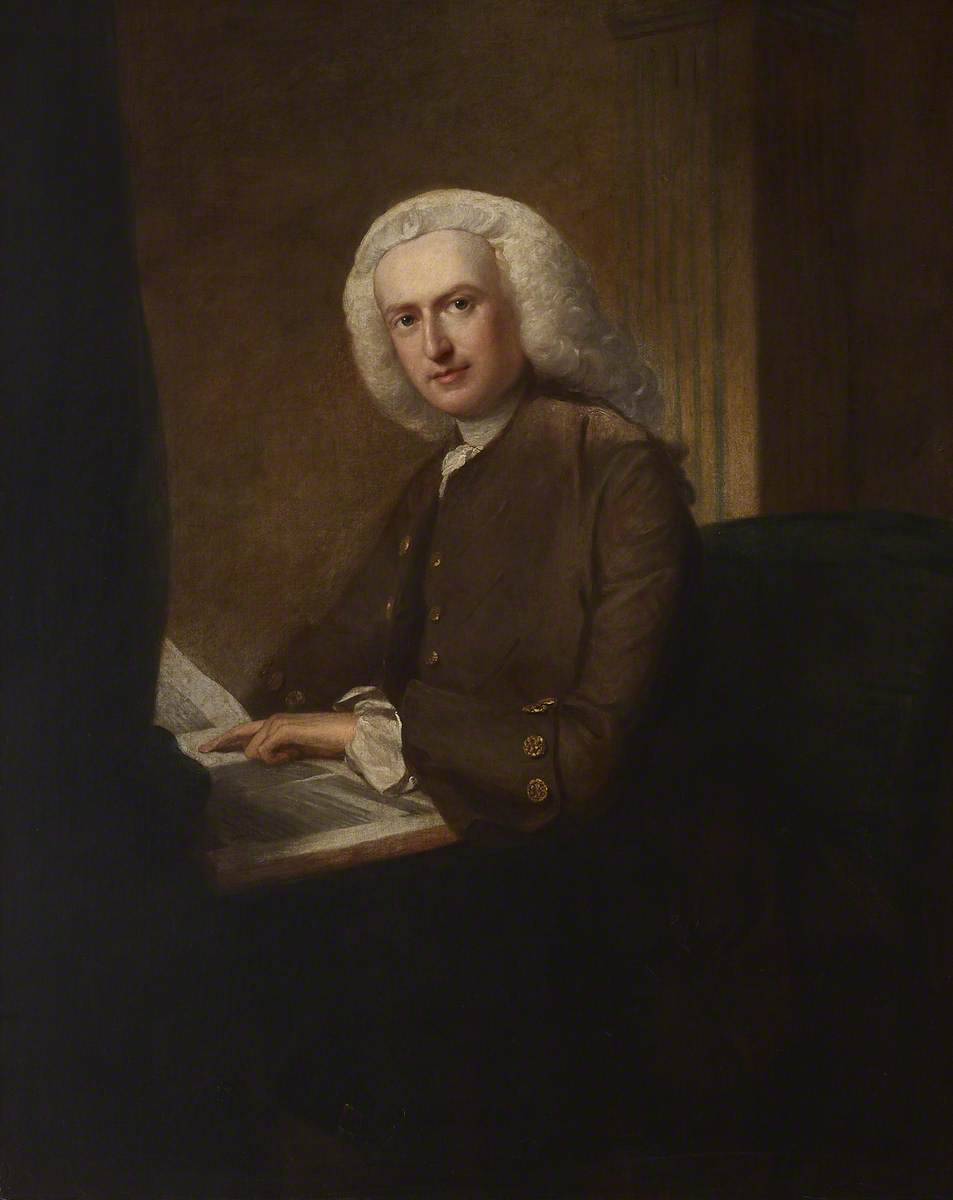
Portrait of Knight by Benjamin Wilson

Gowin Knight FRS (10 September 1713 – 8 June 1772) was a British physicist who, in 1745, discovered a process for producing strongly magnetised steel. He also served as the first principal librarian of the British Museum.

== Biography ==
Born in Corringham, a small parish in Lincolnshire, Knight was educated at Leeds Grammar School and Magdalen Hall, Oxford. He was awarded a BA in October 1736, MA in June 1739 and MB in February 1742, after which he lived in London as a practising physician.

In 1745, he discovered a process for forming strongly magnetised steel, which he used to develop a compass needle able to function with greater precision. He was elected a Fellow of the Royal Society the same year after presenting his findings to the Society. He was honoured in 1747 with the Copley Medal in recognition of his achievements and, by 1752, his technologically advanced compasses were adopted by the Royal Navy, with renowned London instrument craftsman George Adams the Elder engaged in their manufacture.

In 1756, Knight received an appointment as the first principal librarian of the British Museum. He died in London, at age 58.
