= Maysie Webb =

British librarian and museum executive (1923–2005)

- Maysie Webb by Peter Greenham
- Born: 1 May 1923
- Died: 11 December 2005 (aged 82)

Maysie Florence Webb, CBE (1 May 1923 – 11 December 2005) was a British librarian and museum executive. She was Head of the Patent Office Library from 1960 to 1966, and when it was renamed, served as Keeper of the National Reference Library of Science and Invention from 1966 to 1968. As such, she was the first woman to head a national museum. She joined the British Museum in 1968 as assistant director and was its deputy director from 1971 to 1983: these were both newly created posts.

== Honours ==
In the 1979 New Year Honours, she was appointed Commander of the Order of the British Empire (CBE) in recognition of her work as deputy director of the British Museum.

A portrait by Peter Greenham was commissioned by the Trustees of the British Museum to mark Webb's retirement in 1983.

== Selected works ==
- Webb, Maysie (1982). "The Locked Doors: Behind the Scenes at the British Museum". Journal of the Royal Society of Arts. 130 (5309): 260–270. JSTOR 41373376.
