= Ralph Heathcote =

English cleric and writer (1721-1795)

Ralph Heathcote (1721–1795) was an English cleric and writer.

== Life ==
He was born on 19 December 1721 at Barrow-upon-Soar, Leicestershire, where his father (died 1765), later vicar of Sileby and rector of Morton, Derbyshire, was then curate. His mother was a daughter of Simon Ockley, the historian of the Saracens. After receiving instruction from his father, and studying at Chesterfield grammar school, he entered Jesus College, Cambridge, and graduated B.A. in 1744, and M.A. in 1748.

In March 1748, Heathcote became curate of St Margaret's Church, Leicester, and vicar of Barkby in 1749. His publications attracted the notice of William Warburton, who presented Heathcote to the assistant preachership at Lincoln's Inn. He moved in June 1753 to London, where he associated with John Jortin, Thomas Birch, Matthew Maty, and others, who met once a week to drink coffee and talk learnedly.

In the late 1760s Heathcote moved back to the midlands, as a prebendary of Southwell Minster, Nottinghamshire. He became preoccupied with duties as a magistrate, though he continued to visit London for a decade or more. He became vicar-general of the peculiar of Southwell in 1788, and died on 28 May 1795.

== Works ==
In 1746 Heathcote published a Latin dissertation on the history of astronomy, Historia Astronomiæ sive de ortu et progressu astronomiæ. When in 1752 he wanted to take a part in the controversy set off by Conyers Middleton on the miraculous powers ascribed to the early Christian Church, he felt a lack of fluency in literary English. He produced two pamphlets anonymously: Cursory Animadversions on the Controversy in General (1752), and Remarks upon a Charge by Dr. Chapman (1752); and in the following year wrote a reply to Thomas Fothergill's sermon on the uses of commemorating King Charles I's martyrdom.

He took a part in controversy against Henry St John, 1st Viscount Bolingbroke, publishing in 1755 A Sketch of Lord Bolingbroke's Philosophy,’ and against the Hutchinsonian Thomas Patten on the other. His tracts formed the basis of his dissertation on occasion of his D.D. degree at Cambridge in 1759, and of his Boyle lectures, 1763–5. In 1761, he became one of the main writers in the Biographical Dictionary of 1761.

In 1767, Heathcote published an anonymous letter to Horace Walpole on the dispute between David Hume and Jean-Jacques Rousseau, which was attributed to Walpole himself. In 1771, he published anonymously The Irenarch, or Justice of the Peace's Manual; the third edition bore the author's name. The second and third editions have a long dedication to Lord Mansfield. In 1786, he produced a miscellany of anecdotes and dissertations, Sylva.

== Family ==
Heathcote in August 1750 married Margaret Mompesson, a descendant of William Mompesson of Eyam, and attained financial independence.

== On-line edition of works ==
- A Sketch of Lord Bolingbroke's Philosophy- free online version digitized by The Royal Library Copenhagen
