= Peter Templeman =

English physician

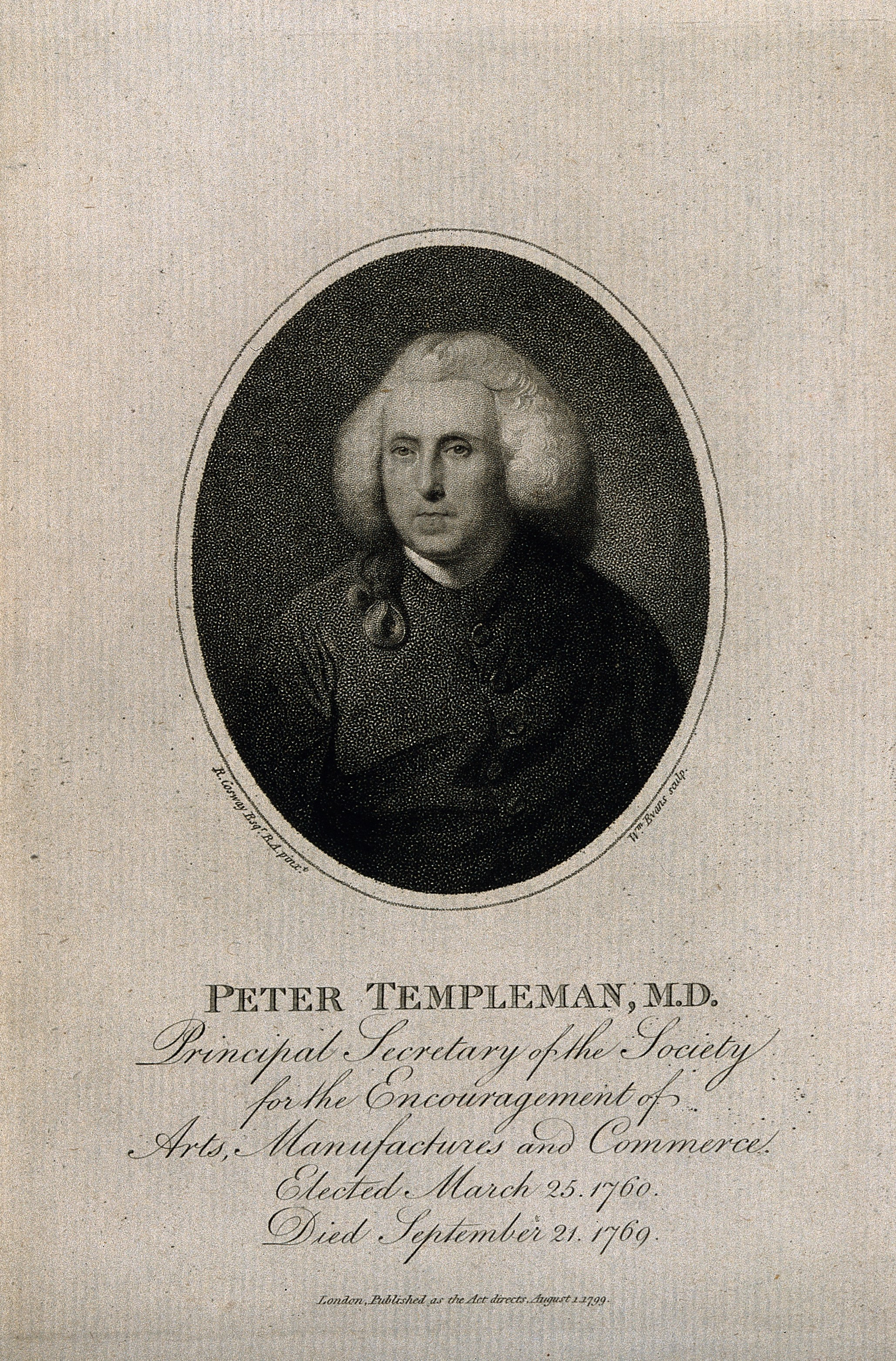
- Born: 17 March 1711
- Died: 23 August 1769 (aged 58)
- Occupation: Physician

Peter Templeman (17 March 1711 – 23 August 1769) was an English physician.

== Biography ==
Templeman was the eldest son of Peter Templeman (d. 1749), a solicitor at Dorchester, by his wife Mary, daughter of Robert Haynes. He was born on 17 March 1711, and educated at the Charterhouse, though not on the foundation. Proceeding to Trinity College, Cambridge, he graduated B.A. with distinguished reputation in 1731 (Graduati Cantabr. 1823, p. 463). He at first intended to take holy orders, but afterwards he applied himself to the study of medicine, and went in 1736 to the university of Leyden, where he attended the lectures of Dr. Herman Boerhaave, and was created M.D. on 10 Sept. 1737 (Album Studiosorum Acad. Lugd. Bat. 1875, p. 967). In 1739 he came to London with a view to enter on the practice of his profession, supported by a handsome allowance from his father. He was so fond, however, of literary leisure and of the society of learned men that he never acquired a very extensive practice.

In 1750 he was introduced to Dr. John Fothergill with a view to institute a medical society in order to procure the earliest intelligence of improvements in physic from every part of Europe, but the plan never took effect. When the British Museum was opened in 1758, for purposes of inspection and study, Templeman was appointed on 22 December to the office of keeper of the reading-room. Gray gives an amusing account of a visit to the reading-room while under his care (Works, 1884, iii. 1–2). Templeman resigned the post on 18 December 1760 on being chosen secretary to the recently instituted Society of Arts, Manufactures, and Commerce. In 1762 he was elected a corresponding member of the Royal Academy of Sciences at Paris, and also of the Economical Society at Berne. He died on 23 August 1769 (Cambridge Chronicle, 30 Aug. 1769). Bowyer says ‘he was esteemed a person of great learning, particularly with respect to languages, spoke French with great fluency, and left the character of a humane, generous, and polite member of society.’ A portrait by Richard Cosway belongs to the Society of Arts, and was engraved by William Evans.

His works are:

- ‘On a Polypus at the Heart, and a Scirrhous Tumour of the Uterus’ (in the ‘Philosophical Transactions,’ 1746).
- ‘Curious Remarks and Observations in Physics, Anatomy, Chirurgery, Chemistry, Botany, and Medicine; selected from the Memoirs of the Royal Academy of Sciences at Paris,’ 2 vols. London, 1753–4, 8vo. Edition of Dr. John Woodward's ‘Select Cases and Consultations in Physic,’ London, 1757, 8vo.
- ‘Travels in Egypt and Nubia: translated from the original Danish of Frederick Lewis Norden, and enlarged,’ 2 vols. London, 1756–7, fol., with the fine engravings made by Tuscher for the original edition. Templeman also published at the same time the entire translation and the whole of his additions in one vol. 8vo, without plates.
- 'Practical Observations on the Culture of Lucern, Turnips, Burnet, Timothy Grass, and Fowl Meadow Grass,' London, 1766, 8vo.
- 'Epitaph on Lady Lucy Meyrick' (in vol. viii. of the 'Select Collection of Miscellany Poems,' 1781).
