= Thomas Cave (merchant) =

English cloth merchant (died 1603)

Thomas Cave (died 1603) was a chapman and a cloth merchant who was born in Burley, which at the time was in the Parish of Otley. Thomas Cave became relatively wealthy and had property in both Wakefield and London as well as land throughout Yorkshire.

Thomas Cave was married to Beatrice Lister, the couple had no children. Thomas Cave was the son of Thomas Cave, who died in 1591.

Thomas Cave died on 4 May 1603, and his will left £250 for the creation of Prince Henry's Grammar School on the condition that the local parish raised a similar amount and acquired land for the school. He also left £20 and two houses for use by "poor men or women being unmarried of good behaviour and lovers of the church" in Wakefield. He also left £40 for the poor children of Leeds, £20 for poor parishioners in Otley and a further 40 Shillings for the poor in Burley.
