= Richard Garnett (writer) =

British scholar, librarian, biographer and poet (1835–1906)

Richard Garnett CB
- Born: 27 February 1835; Lichfield, Staffordshire
- Died: 13 April 1906 (aged 71)
- Occupations: Author; Philologist (historical linguist); Poet; Biographer
- Spouse: Olivia Carney Singleton
- Children: 6, including Edward Garnett and Olive Garnett
- Relatives: Richard Garnett, (father); Constance Garnett, (daughter-in-law), David (Bunny) Garnett, (grandson)
- Writing career
- Notable awards: Companion of the Order of the Bath

Richard Garnett CB (27 February 1835 – 13 April 1906) was an English scholar, librarian, writer, and amateur astrologer. He was keeper of printed books at British Museum from 1890 to 1899.

== Life ==
The son of a philologist of the same name, Garnett was educated at home and at a school in Bloomsbury. He entered the British Museum in 1851 as an assistant librarian. Anthony Panizzi, a close friend of Garnett's father, invited the then 16-year-old Richard to work at the British Museum following his father's death. He married Olivia Narney Singleton in 1863. They had six surviving children. In 1875, he became superintendent of the Reading Room, in 1881, editor of the General Catalogue of Printed Books, and in 1890, succeeding George Bullen, he was Keeper of Printed Books until his retirement in 1899.

He was given the degree of LL.D from the University of Edinburgh in 1883, and in 1895 received the Order of the Bath.

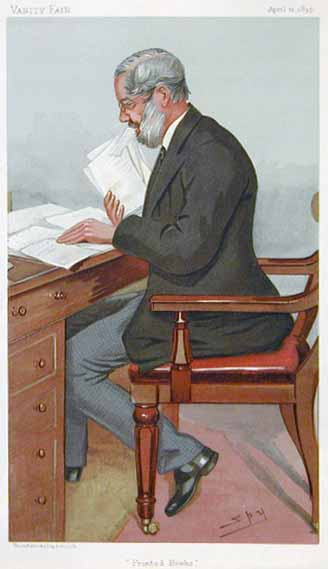
"Printed Books" Garnett by Spy (Leslie Ward) in Vanity Fair, April 1895

His literary works include numerous translations from the Greek, German, Italian, Spanish, and Portuguese; several books of verse; the book of short stories The Twilight of the Gods (1888, 16 stories; 12 stories added in the 1903 edition); biographies of Thomas Carlyle, John Milton, William Blake, and others; The Age of Dryden (1895); Essays of an Ex-Librarian (1901); a History of Italian Literature; English Literature: An Illustrated Record (with Edmund Gosse); and many articles for encyclopaedias, including the ninth and tenth editions of the Encyclopædia Britannica, and the Dictionary of National Biography.

He also discovered and edited some unpublished poems of Shelley (Relics of Shelley, 1862) and edited the republication of the newly discovered poetry collection Original Poetry by Victor and Cazire in 1898. His poem Where Corals Lie was set to music by Sir Edward Elgar as part of Sea Pictures and was first performed in 1899. Long interested in astrology, in 1880 he published a monograph on the subject, "The Soul and the Stars", in the University Magazine under the pseudonym "A. G. Trent"; ill health prevented him from writing more on the subject. He wrote a biography of William Johnson Fox, published 1910.

In 1901, Garnett was elected as a member to the American Philosophical Society.

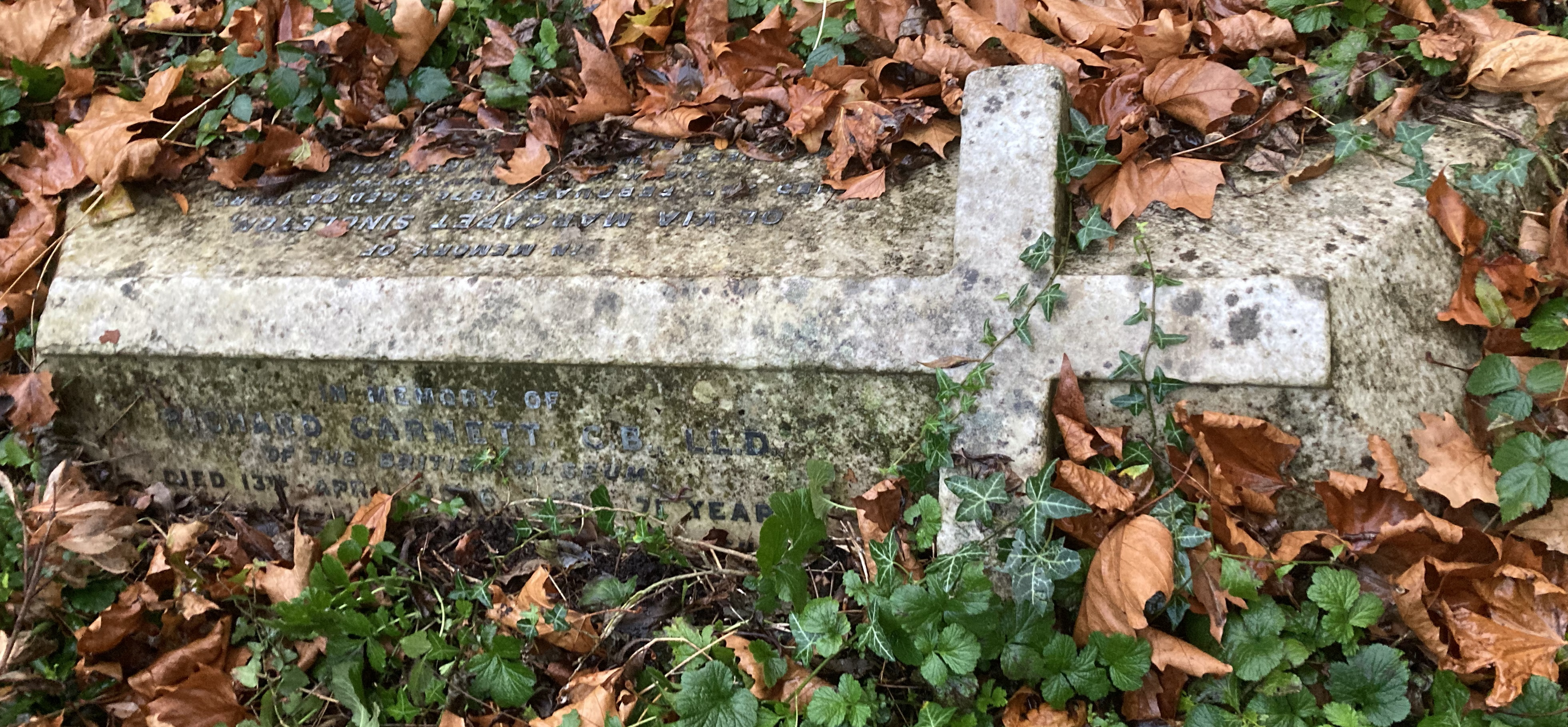
Grave of Richard Garnett (writer) in Highgate Cemetery

He died on 13 April 1906 and was buried on the eastern side of Highgate Cemetery.

According to Joseph McCabe, Garnett "cherished a genuine and somewhat mystical belief in religion, which combined hostility to priestcraft and dogma with a modified belief in astrology".
