= Anthony Panizzi =

Italian-British librarian (1797–1879)

Sir Anthony Panizzi KCB
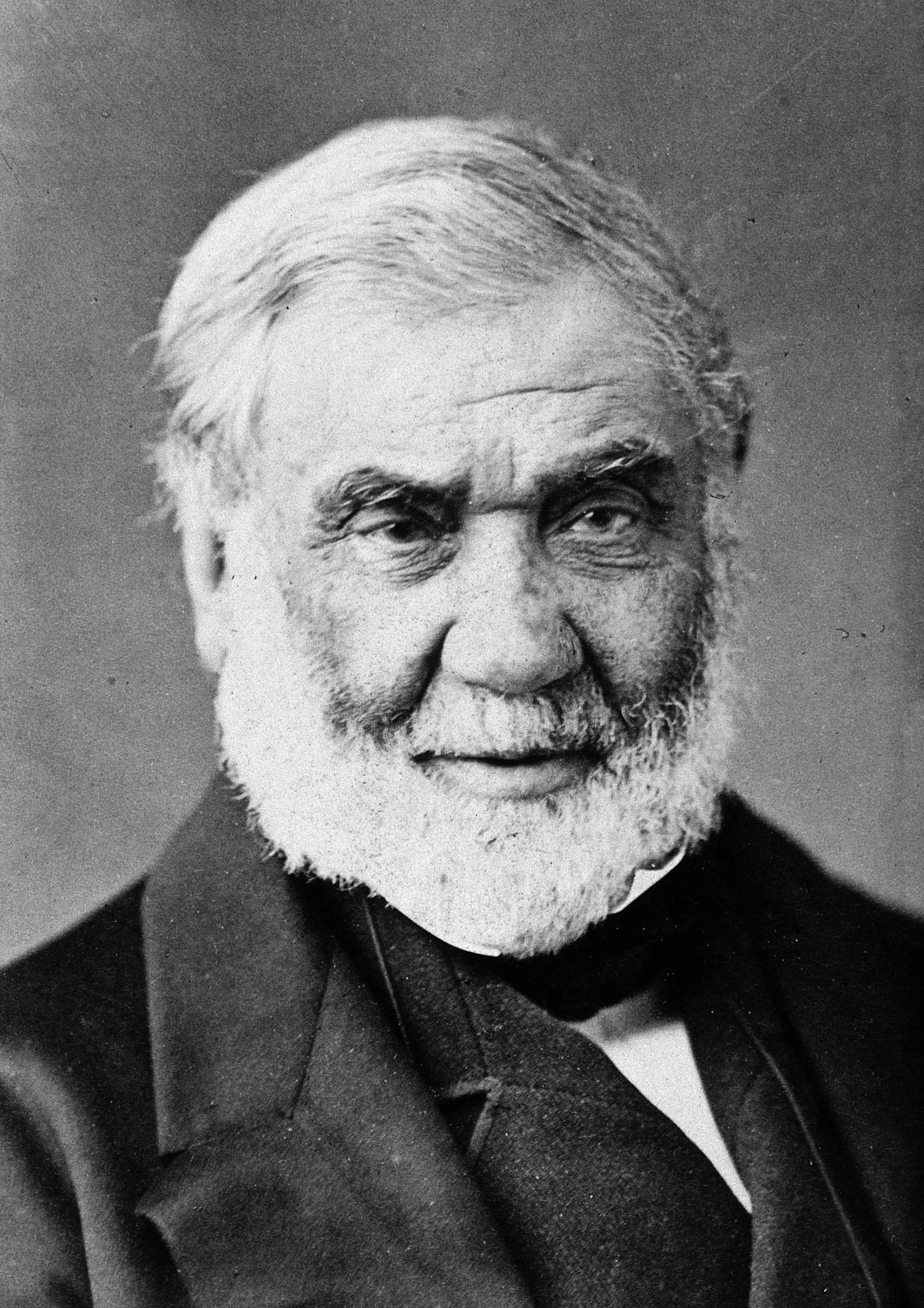
- Born: Antonio Genesio Maria Panizzi; 16 September 1797; Brescello, Cisalpine Republic
- Died: 8 April 1879 (aged 81); London, England, United Kingdom
- Education: University of Parma
- Awards: Knight Commander of the Order of the Bath
- Scientific career
- Fields: Library science
- Workplaces: British Museum Library

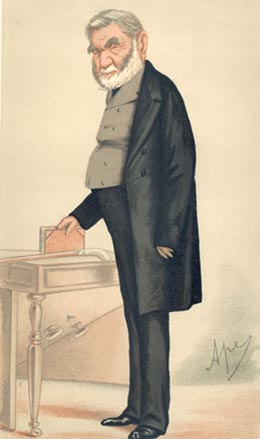
Anthony Panizzi by Carlo Pellegrini in Vanity Fair

Sir Antonio Genesio Maria Panizzi (16 September 1797 – 8 April 1879), better known as Anthony Panizzi, was a naturalised British citizen of Italian birth, and an Italian patriot. He was a librarian, becoming the Principal Librarian (i.e. head) of the British Museum from 1856 to 1866.

== Early life in Italy ==
Panizzi was born at Brescello in the Duchy of Modena and Reggio (now the province of Reggio Emilia), Italy, on 16 September 1797. He studied at the Lyceum of Reggio, then obtained a degree in law from the University of Parma in 1818. He was appointed as Inspector of Public Schools at Brescello.

== Politics and exile ==
It was during this time at Brescello that a charge was brought against Panizzi that he was a Carbonaro, that is, a member of a secret society that opposed the political regime of that time. The evidence would suggest that the accusation was true.

In October 1822, amid political upheaval in Italy, Panizzi was tipped off that he faced arrest and trial as a subversive. The risk was one faced by many Carbonari while Metternich was orchestrating, from Vienna, the repressive policies of puppet regimes in north-eastern and central Italy. Making his way across Italy, Panizzi eventually arrived in Ticino (Switzerland). Here, in 1823, he wrote and published a book decrying the repressive regime and trials against citizens of the Duchy of Modena, Dei Processi e delle Sentenze contra gli imputati di Lesa Maestà e di aderenza alle Sette proscritte negli Stati di Modena. Following the book's publication, he was indicted, tried, and condemned to death in absentia in Modena, and pressure was brought to have him expelled from Switzerland.

== Move to England ==
Panizzi moved to London, England in May 1823. He was greeted in London by Ugo Foscolo, an Italian poet in exile there. A few months later Panizzi moved to Liverpool with a letter of introduction from Foscolo to Liverpool banker William Roscoe, where he resided for five years. Panizzi made a modest living teaching Italian there, but also took up studies of classics, in particular Dante.

In 1826 Panizzi met lawyer and political figure Henry Brougham and helped him in a difficult abduction case; when Brougham became Lord Chancellor of England, he obtained for Panizzi the Professorship of Italian at the newly founded London University (now University College London).

He formally became a British subject in March 1832.

== British Library career ==
In 1831 Panizzi was appointed to the post of "Extra-Assistant-Keeper" at the British Museum Library over the objections of some who did not wish the post to be filled by someone not of the Church of England. His appointment was obtained by Thomas Grenville, a friend of Panizzi and member of the museum's board of trustees. Panizzi held a string of posts there: first Assistant Librarian (1831–1837), then Keeper of Printed Books (1837–1856) and finally Principal Librarian (1856–1866). For his extraordinary services as a librarian, in 1869 he was knighted by Queen Victoria, becoming a Knight Commander of the Order of the Bath.

The British Museum library was the national library of the United Kingdom in all but name. During Panizzi's tenure as Keeper of Printed Books its holdings increased from 235,000 to 540,000 volumes, making it the largest library in the world at the time. Its famous circular Reading Room was designed and built by architect Sydney Smirke from a sketch drawn by Panizzi. The new reading room opened in 1857. The British Museum library formed the bulk of what became the British Library in 1973 and the "Round" Reading Room was in use until 1997 when the Library moved to its current site at St Pancras.

During his tenure at the Library, Panizzi was embroiled in many controversies, many related to his ideas for the museum library catalog. This was similar to an earlier appointment to create a subject catalog of Museum duplicates to be sent to the library of the Royal Society, where he offended Peter Mark Roget by rejecting his model for the list entries.

Other clashes were more of a personal nature, notably Frederic Madden, Keeper of Manuscripts, opposed the appointment of Panizzi. Panizzi's appointment as Keeper of Printed Books was met with criticism due to Panizzi's Italian origin: some felt an Englishman should be in charge of the national institution. Other sources state it was because he had been "seen in the streets of London selling white mice."

Panizzi also had a long-term dispute with historian Thomas Carlyle. While Carlyle worked on his history of the French Revolution, he had complained in a magazine article that "a certain sub-librarian" had not been very helpful to him, restricting access to uncatalogued documents held by the British Museum. Carlyle also complained that the library catalog was neither complete nor helpful. Panizzi never forgot the slight and when Carlyle, now working on the biography of Cromwell, requested the use of a private room at the library for his researches, the request was denied. Despite high-level complaints, Carlyle lost the argument; and he and his supporters opened their own independent subscription library, the London Library.

In 1835–1836 Panizzi recognised that the new Select Committee of the House of Commons on the British Museum would be seeking accountability as to procedures. To prepare with comparative data he visited the main libraries of Western Europe, Italy and the Austrian Empire.

While at the library, Panizzi undertook the creation of a new catalogue, based on the "Ninety-One Cataloguing Rules" (1841) which he devised with his assistants. These rules served as the basis for all subsequent catalogue rules of the 19th and 20th centuries. Panizzi had to give up his concept of "corporate main entry" to have his 91 Rules code approved. Panizzi's idea of corporate authorship later came to public attention through Charles C. Jewett's code for the catalog of the Smithsonian Institution in 1850.

Panizzi was also influential in enforcing the Copyright Act of 1842, which required British publishers to deposit with the library a copy of every book printed in Britain.

Panizzi was a strong advocate of free and equal access to learning, evident in the quote below:

I want a poor student to have the same means of indulging his learned curiosity, of following his rational pursuits, of consulting the same authorities, of fathoming the most intricate inquiry as the richest man in the kingdom, as far as books go, and I contend that the Government is bound to give him the most liberal and unlimited assistance in this respect.

Panizzi is credited with the invention of the "Panizzi pin", a shelf-support pin which prevents wooden shelves from "wobbling".

== Political activities and honours ==
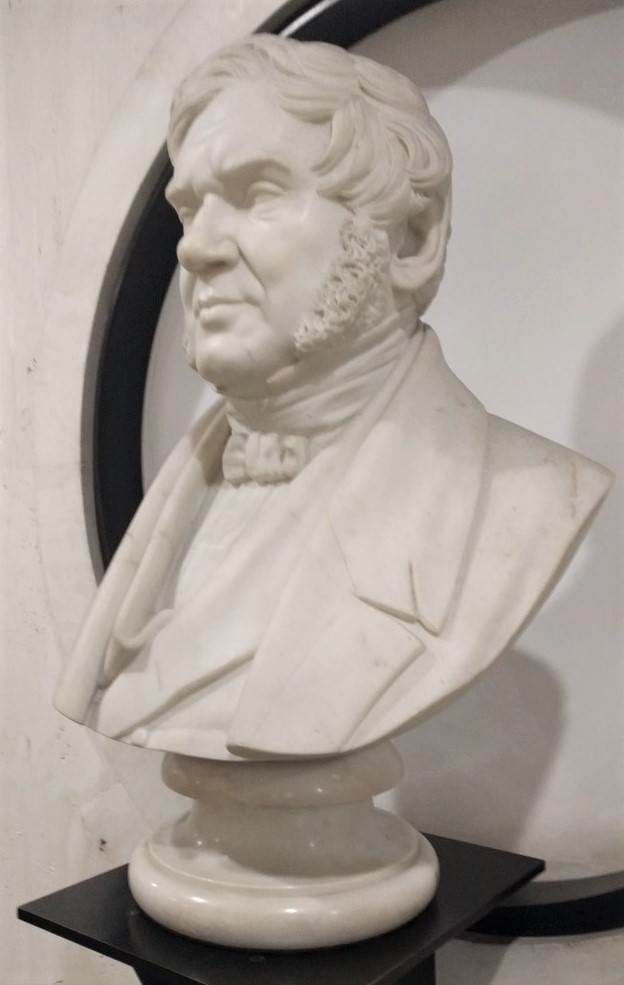
Bust of Panizzi by Carlo Marochetti in the British Library, London

Panizzi was a personal friend of British Prime ministers Lord Palmerston and William Ewart Gladstone, conducted an active correspondence with Sardinian, and later Italian Prime Minister Count Camillo Benso di Cavour, and through French archaeologist and writer Prosper Mérimée, was well acquainted with French Emperor Napoleon III and Empress Eugénie. In 1844, Panizzi also assisted Giuseppe Mazzini, then in exile in London, by publishing an influential article denouncing the practice ordered by the Home Secretary of ordering Mazzini's private letters opened by the Post Office and giving copies of their contents to the Austrian Embassy. He also orchestrated a visit of Giuseppe Garibaldi to England, and convinced Gladstone to travel to Naples to view personally the inhumane conditions in which political prisoners were kept. When his efforts to have these prisoners released failed, he raised money to buy a ship and mounted an expedition to rescue the prisoners from the island fortress of Santo Stefano in the Gulf of Gaeta. Unfortunately, the ship sank in a storm shortly after leaving England. In 1859, the prisoners were released by Neapolitan King Ferdinand II of the Two Sicilies and put on a ship bound for New York. Panizzi helped to ensure that the ship made port in England instead, where the former prisoners received asylum and were assured support.

In addition to his English knighthood, Panizzi was given an honorary degree by Oxford University, the Légion d'Honneur from France, various chivalric honours from the Italian Government and Crown, and in 1868 was appointed as a senator in the Italian Parliament. He never took his seat there.

The Panizzi Lectures are an annual series of bibliography lectures, hosted by the British Library since 1985. There is also a staff meeting room at the British Library called the Panizzi Room in his honour.

== Death ==
Panizzi died in London on 8 April 1879 and was buried in the Kensal Green Catholic Cemetery, not far from the resting places of William Makepeace Thackeray and Anthony Trollope.

== Publications ==
- Panizzi, A. (1828). Extracts from Italian prose writers. J. Taylor. Openlibrary
- Boiardo, M. M., & Ariosto, L. (1830). Orlando Innamorato di Bojardo: Orlando furioso di Ariosto: (A. Panizzi, Ed.). W. Pickering.
- Panizzi, A. (1831). Bibliographical notices of some early editions of the Orlando innamorato and furioso. W. Pickering.
- Panizzi, A., & Mancinelli, F. (1832). Stories from Italian writers : with a literal interlinear translation, on Locke's plan of classical instruction. (1st American from the last London ed.). Carey & Lea.
- Ariosto, L., & Panizzi, A. (1834). Orlando furioso. William Pickering.
- Panizzi, A. (1834). Strictures on the publication of Count Dal Pozzo "On the happiness which the Italians might and ought to attain under the Austrian government" : with some remarks on the Foreign quarterly review. Printed for the author and published by T. Hookham and Effingham Wilson.

== See also ==
- Library catalog
